= List of bicycle-sharing systems =

List of bicycle sharing systems

This is a list of bicycle-sharing systems, both docked and dockless. As of December 2016, roughly 1,000 cities worldwide have bike-sharing programs.

== Bicycle-sharing systems ==
The following table lists bicycle-sharing systems around the world. Most systems listed allow users to pick up and drop off bicycles at any of the automated stations within the network (denoted as 3 Gen.). Other generations are described at Bicycle-sharing system, section Categorization.

Country		City / Region	Name	System	Operator	Launched	Discontinued
Albania		Tirana	Ecovolis			March 2011	Discontinued
Argentina		Buenos Aires	Ecobici	Serttel Brasil	Bike In Baires Consortium	2010	
Argentina		Mendoza	Metrobici			2014	
Argentina		Rosario	Mi Bici Tu Bici			2 December 2015	
Argentina		San Lorenzo, Santa Fe	Biciudad	Biciudad		27 November 2016	
Australia		Melbourne	Melbourne Bike Share	PBSC & 8D	Motivate	June 2010	30 November 2019
Australia		Melbourne	oBike	4 Gen. oBike		July 2017	July 2018
Australia		Brisbane	CityCycle	3 Gen. Cyclocity	JCDecaux	September 2010	July 2021
Australia		Sydney	Reddy Go	Reddy Go		July 2017	
Australia		Sydney	oBike	4 Gen. oBike		July 2017	July 2018
Australia		Sydney	Ofo	4 Gen. Ofo		October 2017	Discontinued
Austria		Burgenland	nextbike	3 Gen. nextbike		2009	
Austria		Innsbruck	nextbike				
Austria		Klagenfurt am Wörthersee	nextbike				
Austria		Kufstein	nextbike				
Austria		Lower Austria	nextbike	3 Gen. nextbike		2009	
Austria		Salzburg	nextbike	3 Gen. nextbike		2011	
Austria		Vienna	Citybike Wien	3 Gen. Cyclocity	JCDecaux Gewista	June 2003	
Austria		Vienna	nextbike				
Austria		Vienna	Viennabike	2 Gen.	Association and city council	April 2002	November 2002
Austria		Vorarlberg	nextbike	3 Gen. nextbike		2009	Discontinued
Bangladesh		Dhaka, Chattogram, Sylhet	JoBike	JoBike		2018	
Belgium		Aalst	Dott				
Belgium		Antwerp	Velo Antwerp	3 Gen. Clear CC	Service2Cities (subsidiary of Clear Channel Belgium)	9 June 2011	
Belgium		Antwerp	Donkey Republic				
Belgium		Brussels	Bolt				
Belgium		Brussels	Dott				
Belgium		Brussels	Villo!	3 Gen. Cyclocity	JCDecaux	19 May 2009 (earlier system since 2006)	
Belgium		Ghent	Donkey Republic				
Belgium		Ghent	Dott				
Belgium		Lille	TIER				
Belgium		Namur	Bolt				
Belgium		Namur	Libiavelo	3 Gen. Cyclocity	JCDecaux	21 April 2012	
Belgium		Various locations	dBlue-bike	Blue-bike	Blue-Mobility	1 May 2011	
Belgium		Various locations	Donkey Republic				
Bosnia and Herzegovina		Banja Luka	BL bike	3 Gen. nextbike	nextbike	3 April 2018	
Bosnia and Herzegovina		Mostar	nextbike	3 Gen. nextbike		26 March 2023	
Bosnia and Herzegovina		Sarajevo	nextbike	3 Gen. nextbike		1 June 2016	
Bosnia and Herzegovina		Tuzla	nextbike	3 Gen. nextbike		14 July 2017	1 May 2019
Bosnia and Herzegovina		Zenica	nextbike	3 Gen. nextbike		11 October 2019	
Brazil		Belo Horizonte	Bikebh	Mobilicidade		2014	
Brazil		Fortaleza	Bicicletar	Mobilicidade		15 December 2014	
Brazil		João Pessoa	SAMBA	Mobilicidade			
Brazil		Niterói	Nitbike	Serttel	Niterói city government & Serttel	4 July 2024	
Brazil		(Pedro de) Toledo	Toopedalando	Toopedalando		2011	
Brazil		Rio de Janeiro	Bike Rio	tembici		2011	
Brazil		Salvador	Bike Salvador	tembici		2013	
Brazil		São Paulo	Bikesampa	tembici		2012	
Brazil		Sorocaba	Integrabike	tembici		2012	
Bulgaria		Burgas	VeloBurgas	Mobilicidade		2012	
Canada		Hamilton	Hamilton Bike Share	Social Bicycles		20 March 2015	
Canada		Kitchener, Ontario	Community Access Bicycles	Community Access Bicycles		2011, relaunched 21 August 2013	
Canada		Montreal	BIXI Montréal	PBSC & 8D		2009	
Canada		Quebec City	àVélo	PBSC		9 July 2021	
Canada		Toronto	Bike Share Toronto	PBSC	Motivate	2011	
Canada		Vancouver	Mobi	3 Gen. CycleHop		20 July 2016	
Canada		Victoria	U-Bicycle			September 2017	2020
Chile		Santiago	Bikesantiago	3 Gen. B-Cycle		2013	
China		Anqiu	Anqiu Public Bicycle			December 2013	
China		Baoji	Baoji Public Bicycle Service			September 2013	
China		Beijing				2012	
China		Changzhou	Changzhou Public Bicycle				
China		Chengdu (Jinniu District)	–	Shanghai Forever Bicycle Co.		June 2010	
China		Chengdu (Gaoxin District)	–			December 2010	
China		Foshan				August 2010	
China		Fuzhou	Fuzhou Public Bicycle			June 2011	
China		Guangzhou	GZ-Public Bicycle			June 2010	
China		Haikou				April 2013	
China		Haining	Haining Public Bicycle			October 2012	
China		Hangzhou	Hangzhou Public Bicycle			October 2008	
China		Heihe				May 2012	
China		Heze				April 2014	
China		Hohhot				October 2013	
China		Huaian	Huaian Public Bicycle			October 2013	
China		Huaibei	Huaibei Public Bicycle			April 2014	
China		Huangyan	Huangyan Public Bicycle			January 2012	
China		Huizhou	Guangzhou Huimin			April 2012	
China		Huzhou	Huzhou Public Bicycle			December 2013	
China		Jiangyin				November 2008	
China		Jiaxing	Jiaxing Public Bicycle			December 2011	
China		Jinhua	Jinhua Orange Public Bicycle Service			October 2013	
China		Jiujiang				February 2014	
China		Jiyuan				September 2013	
China		Kaixian				January 2011	
China		Kunshan		Forever Bicycle		September 2010	
China		Lanxi	China			July 2014	
China		Lanzhou	Lanzhou Public Bicycle			June 2014	
China		Lhasa				November 2013	
China		Linhai				June 2011	
China		Lishui				February 2013	
China		Luoyang	Luoyang Public Bicycle			25 May 2013	
China		Maanshan	Maanshan Public Bicycle				
China		Nanning				December 2013	
China		Nantong	Nantong Economic and Technological Development Area Public Bicycle	Forever Publicbike Intelligent Systems		1 January 2013	
China		Ningbo	Ningbo Public Bicycle			September 2013	
China		Qingzhou				2010	
China		Shanghai		Forever Bicycle		March 2009	
China		Shaoxing	Shaoxing Public Bicycle			15 June 2011	
China		Shenzhen / Shekou / Xiaomeisha	Shenzhen City Bicycle Public	Forever Bicycle		September 2010	
China		Suzhou				2010	
China		Taiyuan				September 2012	
China		Taizhou, Jiangsu				2014	
China		Taizhou, Jiangsu	China			2010	
China		Weifang	Weifang Public Bicycle			October 2013	
China		Wuhu				2012	
China		Wuxi	Wuxibike			January 2010	
China		Xi'an	Xianbicycle			April 2011	
China		Xuzhou				September 2012	
China		Yangzhou				March 2014	
China		Yantai				August 2010	
China		Yiwu				October 2013	
China		Yixing	Yixing Public Bicycle			December 2012	
China		Yueyang				April 2014	
China		Zhangjiagang	Forever Bicycle	Forever Bicycle		June 2010	
China		Zhenjiang	Zhenjiang Public Bicycle			1 April 2013	
China		Zhijin				June 2014	
China		Zhongshan				2010	
China		Zhuhai				December 2012	
China		Zhuzhou		Foshan Tianzhou		May 2011	
Colombia		Ibagué	Ride in Ibagué	5 gen	Infibagué	11 February 2023	
Colombia		Medellín	EnCicla	3 Gen (formally 0 Gen)	The Metropolitan Area of Aburra Valley	2011	
Croatia		Hvar	nextbike				
Croatia		Dalmacia	nextbike				
Croatia		Osijek	nextbike				
Croatia		Split	nextbike				
Croatia		Various locations	nextbike				
Croatia		Zadar	nextbike				
Croatia		Zagreb	nextbike	3 Gen. nextbike		May 2013	
Cyprus		Caps St Georges	nextbike				
Cyprus		Famagusta	nextbike				
Cyprus		Larnaca	nextbike				
Cyprus		Limassol	nextbike	3 Gen. nextbike		May 2012	
Cyprus		Limassol	Bike in Action	3 Gen. Smoove			
Cyprus		Paphos	nextbike				
Cyprus		Pissouri	e-asyGo.com Cyprus	own pedelecs		April 2019	
Cyprus		Nicosia	EasyBike	EasyBike	EasyBike	October 2011	
Cyprus		Nicosia	nextbike				
Cyprus		Nicosia District	Bike in Action	3 Gen. Smoove			
The Czech Republic		Brno	nextbike				
The Czech Republic		Brno	Rekola	4 Gen.		2014	
The Czech Republic		Brno	Velonet		Velonet	9 October 2016	2020
The Czech Republic		České Budějovice	Rekola	4 Gen.		2015	
The Czech Republic		Frýdek-Místek	nextbike				
The Czech Republic		Frýdek-Místek	Rekola	4 Gen.		2018	Discontinued
The Czech Republic		Hradec Králové	nextbike				
The Czech Republic		Hradec Králové	Rekola	4 Gen.		2015	2016
The Czech Republic		Kladno	nextbike				
The Czech Republic		Kladno	Rekola	4 Gen.		2017	2017
The Czech Republic		Krnov	Rekola				
The Czech Republic		Liberec	nextbike				
The Czech Republic		Liberec	Rekola	4 Gen.		2018	Discontinued
The Czech Republic		Olomouc	nextbike				
The Czech Republic		Olomouc	Rekola	4 Gen.		2014	Discontinued
The Czech Republic		Ostrava	nextbike	3 Gen. nextbike	Nextbike	2019	
The Czech Republic		Ostrava	Rekola	4 Gen.		2018	Discontinued
The Czech Republic		Pardubice	Rekola	4 Gen.		2014	2016
The Czech Republic		Prague	Bolt				
The Czech Republic		Prague	Rekola	4 Gen.		2013	
The Czech Republic		Prague	Freebike		HomePort		
The Czech Republic		Prague 4	Velonet		Velonet	9 October 2016	2020
The Czech Republic		Prague 7	Ofo	4 Gen. Ofo	Ofo	2017	Discontinued
The Czech Republic		Prostějov	Rekola				
The Czech Republic		Prostějov	nextbike	3 Gen. nextbike	Nextbike	2019	Discontinued
The Czech Republic		Teplice	Rekola	4 Gen.		2017	Discontinued
The Czech Republic		Various locations	nextbike				
The Czech Republic		Žďár	Rekola				
Denmark		Aarhus	Aarhus City Bikes	2 Gen	Aarhus Municipality	March 2004	
Denmark		Aarhus	Donkey Republic				
Denmark		Aarhus	Bycyklen	2 Gen		May 2007	
Denmark		Copenhagen	Bolt				
Denmark		Copenhagen	Bycyklen	Gobike		16 August 2013	
Denmark		Copenhagen	Donkey Republic				
Denmark		Copenhagen	Dott				
Denmark		Copenhagen	TIER				
Denmark		Copenhagen	Bycykler København	2 Gen		1995	October 2012 (Note: Copenhagen municipality changed its mind and a new version was introduced in late 2013.)
Denmark		Farsø		2 Gen		1991	
Denmark		Odense	Donkey Republic				
Denmark		Various locations	Donkey Republic				
Ecuador		Quito	BiciQ	BiciQ		2012	
Estonia		Tallinn	Bolt				
Estonia		Tartu	Bike Share		Tartu linn	June 2019	
Finland		Espoo	Kaupunkipyörä	CityBike Finland	HSL	2017	
Finland		Hamina	Kaakau	Donkey Republic	Kaakau	2019	
Finland		Helsinki	Helsinki City Bikes	3 Gen. Smoove	Helsinki City Transport (HKL)	May 2017	
Finland		Helsinki	Helsinki City Bikes	2 Gen.	Helsinki City Transport (HKL)	2000	2010
Finland		Hyvinkää	Kaakau	Donkey Republic	Kaakau	2020	2021
Finland		Iisalmi	Kaakau	Donkey Republic	Kaakau	2019	
Finland		Imatra	Kaakau	Donkey Republic	Kaakau	2018	
Finland		Kotka	Kaakau	Donkey Republic	Kaakau	2018	
Finland		Kouvola	Kaakau	Donkey Republic	Kaakau	2018	
Finland		Kuopio	Vilkku-fillarit	Freebike	City of Kuopio	2019	
Finland		Lahti	Mankeli	Freebike		2022	
Finland		Lappeenranta	Kaakau	Donkey Republic	Kaakau	2019	
Finland		Mikkeli	Kaakau	Donkey Republic	Kaakau	2021	2021
Finland		Mäntsälä	Mäntsälä-pyörä	Donkey Republic	Kaakau	2019	
Finland		Oulu	Sykkeli		Nextbike Polska	2019	2019
Finland		Pori	Rolanbike Pori	Rolanbike	Rolanbike	2021	
Finland		Porvoo	Kaakau	Donkey Republic	Kaakau	2020	
Finland		Raseborg	Kaakau	Donkey Republic	Kaakau	2020	
Finland		Riihimäki	Kaakau	Donkey Republic	Kaakau	2020	
Finland		Rauma	Easybike	Easybike	Easybike	2019	
Finland		Seinäjoki	Easybike	Easybike	Easybike	2020	2021
Finland		Tampere	Sale-Pyörä	CityBike Global	Nysse	2021	
Finland		Turku	Föllärit	Donkey Republic	Föli	2022	
Finland		Turku	Föli-Fillarit	Nextbike	Föli	2018	2020
Finland		Vaasa	Rekola	4 Gen.		2018	Discontinued
Finland		Vantaa	Kaupunkipyörä	CityBike	HSL	2019	
Finland		Varkaus	Juro	Juro	Juro Sharing Infra	2021	
France	Auvergne-Rhône-Alpes	Clermont-Ferrand	C.Vélo	3 Gen. Smoove	SMTC	June 2013	
France	Auvergne-Rhône-Alpes	Grenoble	Métrovélo	3 Gen. Smoove		2006	
France	Auvergne-Rhône-Alpes	Grenoble	Dott				
France	Auvergne-Rhône-Alpes	Lyon	Vélo'v	3 Gen. Cyclocity		19 May 2005	
France	Auvergne-Rhône-Alpes	St. Etienne	Vélivert formerly Vélo Vert	3 Gen. Smoove		26 June 2010	
France	Auvergne-Rhône-Alpes	Valence, Drôme	Libélo	3 Gen. Smoove	Transdev	March 2010	
France	Bourgogne-Franche-Comté	Belfort	Optymo	3 Gen. Smoove		May 2013	
France	Bourgogne-Franche-Comté	Besançon	VéloCité	3 Gen. Cyclocity		September 2007	
France	Bourgogne-Franche-Comté	Chalon-sur-Saône	Réflex	3 Gen. Smoove	Transdev	December 2007	
France	Bourgogne-Franche-Comté	Dijon	Velodi	3 Gen. Clear CC		February 2008	
France	Brittany	Rennes	LE vélo STAR	3 Gen. Clear CC		June 1998	
France	Brittany	Vannes	Vélocéa	OYBike		June 2009	
France	Centre-Val de Loire	Orléans	Vélo'+	EFFIA		June 2007	
France	Grand Est	Mulhouse	VéloCité	3 Gen. Cyclocity		15 September 2007	
France	Grand Est	Nancy	VélOstan	3 Gen. Cyclocity	JCDecaux	27 September 2009	
France	Grand Est	Strasbourg	Vélhop	3 Gen. Smoove		October 2010	
France	Grand Est	Strasbourg + Region	nextbike				
France	Hauts-de-France	Amiens	Vélam	3 Gen. Cyclocity		February 2008	
France	Hauts-de-France	Calais	Vel'in	OYBike		July 2010	
France	Hauts-de-France	Dunkirk	Dk'vélo	Veolia		2013	
France	Hauts-de-France	Lille	V'Lille	Keolis		2011	
France	Île-de-France	Cergy-Pontoise	VélO2	Cyclocity	JCDecaux	March 2009	
France	Île-de-France	Créteil	Cristolib	3 Gen. Cyclocity	JCDecaux	April 2010	
France	Île-de-France	Paris	Vélib'	3 Gen. Cyclocity	JCDecaux	15 July 2007	31 December 2017
France	Île-de-France	Paris	Dott				
France	Île-de-France	Paris Region	TIER				
France	Île-de-France	Grand Paris	Vélib' Métropole	3 Gen. Smoove	Smovengo	1 January 2018	
France	Nouvelle-Aquitaine	Bordeaux	VCUB	Keolis		February 2010	
France	Normandy	Caen	V'eol	3 Gen. Clear CC		March 2008	
France	Normandy	Rouen	Cy'clic	3 Gen. Cyclocity		December 2007	
France	Nouvelle-Aquitaine	La Rochelle	Yélo	Homeport		February 2010	
France	Nouvelle-Aquitaine	La Rochelle	Vélos Jaunes	Zero Generation		1974	Discontinued
France	Nouvelle-Aquitaine	Pau	IDEcycle				
France	Nouvelle-Aquitaine	Poitiers	Cap'Vélo			September 2007	
France	Occitania	Montpellier	Vélomagg'	3 Gen. Smoove		June 2007	
France	Occitania	Perpignan	BIP!	3 Gen. Clear CC		February 2008	
France	Occitania	Toulouse	VélôToulouse	3 Gen. Cyclocity		16 November 2007	
France	Pays de la Loire	Angers	VéloCité	3 Gen. Cyclocity		2004	
France	Pays de la Loire	Nantes	Bicloo	3 Gen. Cyclocity		May 2008	
France	Provence-Alpes-Côte d'Azur	Avignon	Vélopop'	3 Gen. Smoove		July 2009	
France	Provence-Alpes-Côte d'Azur	Marseille	Le vélo	3 Gen. Cyclocity		2007	
France	Provence-Alpes-Côte d'Azur	Nice	Vélo Bleu	OYBike		July 2009	
Georgia		Batumi	BatumVelo	3 Gen. SmooveKey	Batumi Avtotransporti	May 2013	
Germany	Baden-Württemberg	Baden-Baden	nextbike				
Germany	Baden-Württemberg	Baden-Baden	Call a Bike	3 & 4 Gen. Call a Bike flex		2015	Discontinued
Germany	Baden-Württemberg	Freiburg im Breisgau	Call a Bike	3 & 4 Gen. Call a Bike flex		2010	
Germany	Baden-Württemberg	Freiburg im Breisgau	nextbike	3 Gen. nextbike		2019	
Germany	Baden-Württemberg	Friedrichshafen	Dott				
Germany	Baden-Württemberg	Heidelberg	Call a Bike				
Germany	Baden-Württemberg	Heidelberg	nextbike				
Germany	Baden-Württemberg	Karlsruhe	nextbike				
Germany	Baden-Württemberg	Konstanz	nextbike				
Germany	Baden-Württemberg	Mannheim	Call a Bike				
Germany	Baden-Württemberg	Mannheim	nextbike				
Germany	Baden-Württemberg	Offenburg	nextbike	3 Gen. nextbike		2010	
Germany	Baden-Württemberg	Ortenaukreis	nextbike				
Germany	Baden-Württemberg	Region Mittlerer Oberrhein	KVV.nextbike	nextbike			
Germany	Baden-Württemberg	Reutlingen	TIER				
Germany	Baden-Württemberg	Stuttgart + Region	Call a Bike	4 Gen. Call a Bike fix		June 2007	
Germany	Baden-Württemberg	Tübingen	TIER				
Germany	Baden-Württemberg	Tübingen	nextbike	3 Gen. nextbike		2009	Discontinued
Germany	Baden-Württemberg	Tuttlingen	Donkey Republic				
Germany	Baden-Württemberg	Überlingen	Dott				
Germany	Baden-Württemberg	Ulm	TIER				
Germany	Bavaria	Aschaffenburg	Call a Bike	3 Call a Bike			
Germany	Bavaria	Aschaffenburg	nextbike	3 Gen.			
Germany	Bavaria	Augsburg	Donkey Republic				
Germany	Bavaria	Bamberg	Donkey Republic				
Germany	Bavaria	Cham	Donkey Republic				
Germany	Bavaria	Coburg	nextbike	3 Gen. nextbike		2009	Discontinued
Germany	Bavaria	Erlangen	VAG_Rad	nextbike			
Germany	Bavaria	Fürth	VAG_Rad	nextbike			
Germany	Bavaria	Ingolstadt	Call a Bike				
Germany	Bavaria	Landshut	Donkey Republic				
Germany	Bavaria	Lindau	TIER				
Germany	Bavaria	Munich	Bolt				
Germany	Bavaria	Munich	Call a Bike	4 Gen. Call a Bike flex		March 2000	
Germany	Bavaria	Munich	nextbike	3 Gen. nextbike		2011	
Germany	Bavaria	Munich	TIER				
Germany	Bavaria	Nuremberg	Lastenrad für alle	Bluepingu e.V.		2017	
Germany	Bavaria	Nuremberg	VAG_Rad	3 & 4 Gen. nextbike		2019	
Germany	Bavaria	Nuremberg	NorisBike	3 Gen. nextbike		2011	2018
Germany	Bavaria	Regensburg	Donkey Republic				
Germany	Bavaria	Regensburg	TIER				
Germany	Bavaria	Schwabach	VAG_Rad	nextbike			
Germany	Bavaria	Straubing	Donkey Republic				
Germany	Bavaria	Würzburg	Call a Bike				
Germany	Berlin	Berlin	Bolt				
Germany	Berlin	Berlin	Call a Bike			April 2020	
Germany	Berlin	Berlin	Donkey Republic	4 Gen.		April 2017	
Germany	Berlin	Berlin	fLotte	0. Gen	Freie Lastenräder	March 2018	
Germany	Berlin	Berlin	LimeBike	4 Gen.		April 2018	
Germany	Berlin	Berlin	nextbike	3 Gen. nextbike		2009	
Germany	Berlin	Berlin	TIER				
Germany	Berlin	Berlin	Call a Bike	3 & 4 Gen. Call a Bike flex		March 2003	2016
Germany	Berlin	Berlin	Call a Bike (LIDL-BIKES)	3 & 4 Gen. Call a Bike flex		March 2017	April 2020
Germany	Berlin	Berlin	Jump Bikes	4 Gen.	Jump Bikes	November 2018	Discontinued
Germany	Berlin	Berlin	Mobike	4 Gen.		November 2017	Discontinued
Germany	Berlin	Berlin	Ofo	4 Gen. Ofo		October 2016	August 2018
Germany	Brandenburg	Potsdam	nextbike	3 Gen. nextbike		2010	
Germany	Brandenburg	Prignitz	Donkey Republic				
Germany	Bremen	Bremen	Call a Bike				
Germany	Bremen	Bremen	nextbike				
Germany	Bremen	Bremen	LimeBike	4 Gen.		March 2018	Discontinued
Germany	Hamburg	Hamburg	Bolt				
Germany	Hamburg	Hamburg	LimeBike				
Germany	Hamburg	Hamburg	nextbike	3 Gen. nextbike		2008	
Germany	Hamburg	Hamburg	StadtRAD Hamburg	3 & 4 Gen. Call a Bike flex	Deutsche Bahn	July 2009	
Germany	Hamburg	Hamburg	TIER				
Germany	Hesse	Darmstadt	Bolt				
Germany	Hesse	Darmstadt	Call a Bike	3 & 4 Gen. Call a Bike flex		2014	
Germany	Hesse	Dreieich	Byke	4 Gen.		October 2017	2018
Germany	Hesse	Eschborn	Call a Bike				
Germany	Hesse	Frankfurt am Main	Bolt				
Germany	Hesse	Frankfurt am Main	Call a Bike	3 & 4 Gen. Call a Bike flex		March 2000	
Germany	Hesse	Frankfurt am Main	nextbike	3 Gen. nextbike		2009	
Germany	Hesse	Frankfurt am Main	Byke	4 Gen.		October 2017	2018
Germany	Hesse	Frankfurt am Main	LimeBike	4 Gen.		January 2018	Discontinued
Germany	Hesse	Giessen	nextbike				
Germany	Hesse	Hanau	Call a Bike				
Germany	Hesse	Hanau	nextbike				
Germany	Hesse	Kassel	nextbike			2018	
Germany	Hesse	Kassel	Konrad			2011	2017
Germany	Hesse	Langen	Byke	4 Gen.		October 2017	2018
Germany	Hesse	Marburg	nextbike				
Germany	Hesse	Offenbach	Call a Bike				
Germany	Hesse	Rüsselsheim	nextbike				
Germany	Hesse	Wiesbaden	Call a Bike				
Germany	Hesse	Wiesbaden	nextbike				
Germany	Lower Saxony	Achim	nextbike				
Germany	Lower Saxony	Göttingen	Call a Bike				
Germany	Lower Saxony	Hannover	Call a Bike				
Germany	Lower Saxony	Hannover	Donkey Republic				
Germany	Lower Saxony	Hannover	nextbike				
Germany	Lower Saxony	Hannover	Mobike				2020
Germany	Lower Saxony	Hannover	oBike	4 Gen. oBike		2017	2018
Germany	Lower Saxony	Lüneburg	Call a Bike				
Germany	Lower Saxony	Oldenburg	Call a Bike				
Germany	Lower Saxony	Oldenburg	nextbike				
Germany	Lower Saxony	Winsen (Luhe)	nextbike				
Germany	Mecklenburg-Vorpommern	Rostock	Call a Bike				
Germany	Mecklenburg-Vorpommern	Warnemünde	Call a Bike				
Germany	North Rhine-Westphalia	Aachen	Velocity	3 Gen.		27 June 2008	
Germany	North Rhine-Westphalia	Ahrweiler (district)	AW-bike	nextbike			
Germany	North Rhine-Westphalia	Bielefeld	Call a Bike				
Germany	North Rhine-Westphalia	Bielefeld	nextbike	3 Gen. nextbike		2009	
Germany	North Rhine-Westphalia	Bochum	metropolradruhr	3 Gen. nextbike		2010	
Germany	North Rhine-Westphalia	Bonn	Call a Bike				
Germany	North Rhine-Westphalia	Bonn	nextbike	3 & 4 Gen. Call a Bike flex		October 2018	
Germany	North Rhine-Westphalia	Bottrop	metropolradruhr	3 Gen. nextbike		2010	
Germany	North Rhine-Westphalia	Cologne	Bolt				
Germany	North Rhine-Westphalia	Cologne	Call a Bike	3 & 4 Gen. Call a Bike flex		March 2000	
Germany	North Rhine-Westphalia	Cologne	nextbike				
Germany	North Rhine-Westphalia	Cologne	TIER				
Germany	North Rhine-Westphalia	Cologne	Mobike				Discontinued
Germany	North Rhine-Westphalia	Dortmund	metropolradruhr	3 Gen. nextbike		July 2008	
Germany	North Rhine-Westphalia	Duisburg	metropolradruhr	3 Gen. nextbike		September 2010	
Germany	North Rhine-Westphalia	Düsseldorf	Bolt				
Germany	North Rhine-Westphalia	Düsseldorf	LimeBike				
Germany	North Rhine-Westphalia	Düsseldorf	nextbike	3 Gen. nextbike		2008	
Germany	North Rhine-Westphalia	Düsseldorf	Velocity				
Germany	North Rhine-Westphalia	Düsseldorf	TIER				
Germany	North Rhine-Westphalia	Düsseldorf	Call a Bike branded FordPass Bike	3 Gen. Call a Bike		October 2017	Discontinued
Germany	North Rhine-Westphalia	Düsseldorf	Flexbeee	4 Gen.		July 2018	Discontinued
Germany	North Rhine-Westphalia	Düsseldorf	Mobike	4 Gen.		30 May 2018	Discontinued
Germany	North Rhine-Westphalia	Essen	metropolradruhr	3 Gen. nextbike		2010	
Germany	North Rhine-Westphalia	Euskirchen (district)	Eifel e-Bike	nextbike			
Germany	North Rhine-Westphalia	Gelsenkirchen	metropolradruhr	3 Gen. nextbike		2010	
Germany	North Rhine-Westphalia	Gütersloh	Call a Bike				
Germany	North Rhine-Westphalia	Gütersloh	nextbike				
Germany	North Rhine-Westphalia	Hamm	metropolradruhr	3 Gen. nextbike		2010	
Germany	North Rhine-Westphalia	Heinsberg (district)	westBike	nextbike			
Germany	North Rhine-Westphalia	Herne	metropolradruhr	3 Gen. nextbike		2010	
Germany	North Rhine-Westphalia	Leverkusen	nextbike				
Germany	North Rhine-Westphalia	Lippstadt	nextbike				
Germany	North Rhine-Westphalia	Lünen	metropolradruhr	nextbike			
Germany	North Rhine-Westphalia	Mönchengladbach	nextbike				
Germany	North Rhine-Westphalia	Mülheim	metropolradruhr	3 Gen. nextbike		2010	
Germany	North Rhine-Westphalia	Münster	Bolt				
Germany	North Rhine-Westphalia	Münster	tretty			August 2020	
Germany	North Rhine-Westphalia	Ochtrup	Donkey Republic				
Germany	North Rhine-Westphalia	Oberhausen	Call a Bike				
Germany	North Rhine-Westphalia	Oberhausen	metropolradruhr	3 Gen. nextbike		2010	
Germany	North Rhine-Westphalia	Rheinisch-Bergischer Kreis	Bergisches E-Bike	nextbike			
Germany	North Rhine-Westphalia	Rhein-Erft-Kreis	REVG mobic	nextbike			
Germany	North Rhine-Westphalia	Rhein-Sieg-Kreis (west of the Rhine)	RVK	nextbike			
Germany	North Rhine-Westphalia	Rhein-Sieg-Kreis (east of the Rhine)	RSVG	nextbike			
Germany	North Rhine-Westphalia	Siegerland	Velocity Siegerland	Velocity			Discontinued
Germany	North Rhine-Westphalia	Witten	metropolradruhr	nextbike			
Germany	Rhineland-Palatinate	Kaiserslautern	Call a Bike				
Germany	Rhineland-Palatinate	Kaiserslautern	nextbike				
Germany	Rhineland-Palatinate	Ludwigshafen	nextbike				
Germany	Rhineland-Palatinate	Mainz	Call a Bike				
Germany	Rhineland-Palatinate	Mainz	de:MeinRad			July 2011	
Germany	Rhine-Neckar Metropolitan Region		VRNnextbike	nextbike			
Germany	Saarland	Saarbrücken	Call a Bike				
Germany	Saarland	Saarbrücken	TIER				
Germany	Saxony	Dresden	MOBI	nextbike			
Germany	Saxony	Dresden	nextbike	3 Gen. nextbike	DVB	2005	2017
Germany	Saxony	Dresden	SZ-Bike	nextbike		2017	Discontinued
Germany	Saxony	Leipzig	nextbike	3 Gen. nextbike		2008	
Germany	Saxony	Schkeuditz	nextbike				
Germany	Saxony	Taucha	nextbike				
Germany	Saxony-Anhalt	Halle (Saale)	Call a Bike				
Germany	Saxony-Anhalt	Halle (Saale)	nextbike				
Germany	Saxony-Anhalt	Magdeburg	Call a Bike				
Germany	Saxony-Anhalt	Magdeburg	nextbike	3 Gen. nextbike		2008	2018
Germany	Schleswig-Holstein	Flensburg	nextbike	3 Gen. nextbike		2009	Discontinued
Germany	Schleswig-Holstein	Kiel + Region	Donkey Republic				
Germany	Schleswig-Holstein	Lübeck	Call a Bike				
Germany	Schleswig-Holstein	Norderstedt	nextbike				
Germany	Schleswig-Holstein	Pinneberg	TIER				
Germany	Schleswig-Holstein	Schlei Region	Donkey Republic				
Germany	Thuringia	Erfurt	nextbike	3 Gen. nextbike		2009	May 2023
Germany	Thuringia	Weimar	Call a Bike				
Greece		Aigialeia	Cyclopolis	3 Gen.		2013	
Greece		Aktio-Vonitsa	Cyclopolis	3 Gen.		2013	
Greece		Ancient Olympia	Cyclopolis	3 Gen.		2013	
Greece		Corfu	EasyBike	3 Gen. Smoove		November 2010	
Greece		Didymóteicho	EasyBike	3 Gen. Smoove		May 2013	
Greece		East Mani	EasyBike	3 Gen. Smoove		2013	
Greece		Ioannina	EasyBike	3 Gen. Smoove		September 2012	
Greece		Iraklio	EasyBike	3 Gen. Smoove		April 2010	
Greece		Karditsa	EasyBike	3 Gen. Smoove		March 2013	
Greece		Kavala	EasyBike	3 Gen. Smoove		2013	
Greece		Keratsini-Drapetsóna	EasyBike	3 Gen. Smoove		November 2012	
Greece		Komotini	EasyBike	3 Gen. Smoove		2013	
Greece		Marathónas	Cyclopolis	3 Gen.		2013	
Greece		Maroussi	Cyclopolis	3 Gen.		February 2013	
Greece		Moscháto-Távros	Cyclopolis	3 Gen.		January 2013	
Greece		Náfplion	Cyclopolis	3 Gen.		June 2013	
Greece		Naupactus	EasyBike	3 Gen. Smoove		January 2013	
Greece		Municipality of Nafpaktos municipality bike rental		0 Gen.		June 2010	
Greece		Nea Erithréa municipality bike rental		0 Gen.		2010	
Greece		Nea Smyrni	Cyclopolis	3 Gen.		2013	
Greece		Salonica	Aristotle University of Thessaloniki Bike	0 Gen.		May 2012	
Greece		Sikyona	Cyclopolis	3 Gen.		2013	
Hungary		Budapest	MOL BuBi	3 Gen.		April 2014	
Hungary		Esztergom	EBI			20 September 2013	
Hungary		Győr	GyőrBike			7 September 2015	
Hungary		Kaposvár	Kapsvári Tekergő			27 October 2015	
Hungary		Szeged	CityBike Szeged	CityBike Szeged		1 October 2013	
India		Bengaluru	Namma Cycle			2013	
India		Mumbai	FreMo, Cycle Chalao			2012	
India		Mysuru	Embarq, India			2009	
India		New Delhi	Greenolution			2007	
Indonesia		Bandung	Boseh	Banopolis		July 2017	
Indonesia		Jakarta	Bike2Work			2004	
Indonesia		Jakarta	Gowes			2018	Discontinued
Iran		Shiraz	Bdood	4 Gen. Bdood		31 December 2019	
Iran		Tehran	Bdood	4 Gen. Bdood		18 December 2018	
Ireland		Cork	Coca-Cola Zero Bikes		NTA & An Rothar Nua	18 December 2014	
Ireland		Dublin	Dublinbikes	Cyclocity	JCDecaux	September 2009	
Ireland		Dublin Region	TIER				
Ireland		Dún Laoghaire	Bolt				
Ireland		Galway	Coca-Cola Zero Bikes		NTA & An Rothar Nua	24 November 2014	
Ireland		Kilkenny	Bolt				
Ireland		Limerick	Coca-Cola Zero Bikes		NTA & An Rothar Nua	8 December 2014	
Ireland		Limerick	nextbike				
Ireland		Navan	nextbike				
Ireland		Sligo	Bolt				
Ireland		Waterford	TFI Bikes		NTA & An Rothar Nua	4 July 2022	
Ireland		Wexford	Bolt				
Israel		Tel Aviv	Dott				
Israel		Tel Aviv	Metrofun			April 2016	
Italy		Alpignano	ToBike				
Italy		Bergamo	nextbike				
Italy		Bologna	RideMovi				
Italy		Brescia	Bicimia				
Italy		Carugate	Meglio in Bici			5 May 2012	
Italy		Cernusco sul Naviglio	Meglio in Bici			5 May 2012	
Italy		Collegno	ToBike				
Italy		Druento	ToBike				
Italy		Ferrara	Dott				
Italy		Florence	RideMovi				
Italy		Florence	Ofo			2017	Discontinued
Italy		Gorizia	nextbike				
Italy		Grugliasco	ToBike				
Italy		Milan	BikeMi	3 Gen. Clear CC		8 December 2008	
Italy		Milan	RideMovi				
Italy		Milan	Mobike	4 Gen.		30 August 2017	Discontinued
Italy		Milan	Bitride Sharing	Zehus		1 March 2018	31 December 2018
Italy		Milan	Ofo	4 Gen. Ofo		20 September 2017	Discontinued
Italy		Mondolfo	nextbike				
Italy		Padua	GoodBike Padova				
Italy		Padua	Mobike				Discontinued
Italy		Padua	RideMovi				
Italy		Pioltello	Meglio in Bici			5 May 2012	
Italy		Pisa	Ciclopi			May 2013	
Italy		Rimini	Rimini in Bici				
Italy		Senigiallia	nextbike				
Italy		Rome	Dott				
Italy		Rome	Roma'n'Bike				
Italy		Turin	Dott				
Italy		Turin	RideMovi				
Italy		Turin	ToBike			4 March 2011	
Italy		Varese	Dott				
Italy		Various locations	RideMovi				
Italy		Venaria Reale	ToBike				
Italy		Venice (Mestre)	RideMovi				
Japan		Kyoto	Community Cycle				
Japan		Toyama, Toyama	Cyclocity Toyama	Cyclocity	JCDecaux	22 March 2010	
Japan		Yokohama	Baybike			April 2011	
Kazakhstan		Almaty	Almatybike	3 Gen. Smoove		June 2016	
Kazakhstan		Astana	Astanabike	3 Gen. Smoove		July 2014	
Kazakhstan		Shymkent	Shymkentbike	3 Gen. Smoove		July 2016	
Latvia		Riga, Jurmala	BalticBike				
Latvia		Riga	nextbike				
Lithuania		Vilnius	CycloCity	3 Gen. Cyclocity	JCDecaux	2013	
Lithuania		Kaunas	CityBee		CityBee	2016	
Lithuania		Kaunas	Bolt		Bolt	2022	
Luxembourg		Luxembourg City	Vel'oh	3 Gen. Cyclocity		March 2008	
Malaysia		George Town	LinkBike	Fast Rent Bike (PG)		December 2016	
Mexico		Guadalajara	MIBICI	PBSC		2014	
Mexico		Mexico City	Ecobici	3 Gen. Clear CC		2010	
Mexico		Playa del Carmen	BiciPlaya	App, QR Code Scanning, Creditcard/NFC Cards	Promotora de Reordenamiento Urbano S.A. de C.V.	15 September 2019	
Mexico		Toluca (inactive)		PBSC			
Netherlands		Amsterdam	WhiteBikes	WhiteBikes	Provo	1965	1966
Netherlands		Amsterdam	Donkey Republic				
Netherlands		Delft	Mobike	4 Gen.		2018/2019	
Netherlands		Eindhoven	TIER				
Netherlands		Eindhoven	Dott				
Netherlands		Enschede	Bolt				
Netherlands		Groningen	Bolt				
Netherlands		Hengelo	Bolt				
Netherlands		Limburg (province)	Velocity				
Netherlands		Nijmegen	Bolt				
Netherlands		Rotterdam	Donkey Republic				
Netherlands		Rotterdam	Mobike	4 Gen.		2018/2019	
Netherlands		The Hague	Donkey Republic				
Netherlands		The Hague	Mobike	4 Gen.		2018/2019	
Netherlands		Utrecht	Dott				
Netherlands		Utrecht	TIER				
Netherlands		Various locations (especially railway stations)	OV-fiets	OV-Fiets/Nederlandse Spoorwegen		2003	
Netherlands		Various locations	Bikedispenser			2005	
Netherlands		Various locations	Donkey Republic				
Norway		Drammen	Drammen City Bikes	3 Gen. Clear CC		2001	
Norway		Oslo	Bolt				
Norway		Oslo	Oslo Bysykkel	3 Gen. Clear CC		2003	
Norway		Sandnes		3 Gen. Clear CC		2002	
Norway		Sandnes		WhiteBikes	volunteers and city council	1996	2002
Norway		Trondheim	Trondheim City Bikes	Bycykler		1998	2005
Norway		Trondheim	Trondheim City Bikes	3 Gen. Clear CC		2005	
Poland		Białystok	BiKeR	3 Gen. nextbike		31 May 2014	
Poland		Gdańsk-Gdynia-Sopot (Tricity) Metropolitan Area	Mevo		NB Tricity (nextbike)	26 March 2019	29 October 2019
Poland		Gdańsk-Gdynia-Sopot (Tricity) Metropolitan Area	Mevo		CityBike Global	13 September 2023 (testing); 16 November 2023 (full operation)	
Poland		Grodzisk Mazowiecki	Grodziski Rower Miejski	3 Gen. nextbike		27 September 2014	
Poland		Juchnowiec Kościelny	Rower Gminny	3 Gen. nextbike		July 2015	
Poland		Metropolis GZM (Katowice, Gliwice, Chorzów, Sosnowiec, Dąbrowa Górnicza and 35 other gminas of the area)	Metrorower	4 Gen. nextbike	Nextbike	25 February 2024	
Poland		Konstancin	Konstanciński Rower Miejski	3 Gen. nextbike		14 June 2014	
Poland		Kraków	LajkBike			September 2023	
Poland		Łódź	Łódzki Rower Publiczny	3 Gen. nextbike		30 April 2016	
Poland		Lublin	Lubelski Rower Miejski	3 Gen. nextbike		19 September 2014	
Poland		Opole	Opole Bike	3 Gen. nextbike		15 June 2012	
Poland		Poznań	Poznański Rower Miejski	3 Gen. nextbike		April 2012	
Poland		Rzeszów	RoweRes			2010	
Poland		Sopot	Rower Trójmiejski	3 Gen. nextbike		5 September 2013	
Poland		Szczecin	Bike S	3 Gen. nextbike		2015	
Poland		Toruń	Toruński Rower Miejski (Torvelo)			April 2014	
Poland		Warsaw	Bemowo Bike	3 Gen. nextbike		1 April 2012	
Poland		Warsaw	Veturilo	3 Gen. nextbike		1 August 2012	
Poland		Wrocław	Wrocławski Rower Miejski	3 Gen. nextbike		June 2011	
Portugal		Águeda	beÁgueda	3 Gen.		2011	
Portugal		Alcochete	#Alcochete	3 Gen.		2021	
Portugal		Alenquer	Alenequer Green Lab	3 Gen.		2020	
Portugal		Alijó		3 Gen.		2022	
Portugal		Alvito		3 Gen.		2022	
Portugal		Anadia	b→AND	3 Gen.		2014	
Portugal		Aveiro		3 Gen.		2000	
Portugal		Benavente	baGO	3 Gen.		2024	
Portugal		Bragança		1 Gen.		2015	
Portugal		Cascais	MobiCascais biCas	1 Gen.		2016	
Portugal		Caldas da Raínha	Rainhas	3 Gen.		2021	
Portugal		Coruche	Campinas	3 Gen.		2025	
Portugal		Covilhã		3 Gen.		2022	
Portugal		Entroncamento	BUE	3 Gen.		2023	
Portugal		Faro	RideMovi				
Portugal		Figueira da Foz	Figas	3 Gen.		2020	
Portugal		Graciosa		3 Gen.		2021	
Portugal		Lisbon	Bolt				
Portugal		Lisbon	GIRA	3 Gen.		2017	
Portugal		Lousada	Conernélias	3 Gen.		2022	
Portugal		Mealhada	BipeBipe	3 Gen.		2021	
Portugal		Mesão Frio	MesãoBike	1 Gen.		2022	
Portugal		Oliveira de Azeméis		2 Gen.		2021	
Portugal		Pombal	POMBike	3 Gen.		2022	
Portugal		Santo Tirso	Pedala	3 Gen.		2019	
Portugal		Seia	Ginga	3 Gen.		2020	
Portugal		Torres Vedras	Agostinhas	3 Gen.		5 June 2013	
Portugal		Valença, Monção, Vila Nova de Cerveira, Salvaterra do Minho, Tomiño	e-Bike Rio Minho	3 Gen.		2022	
Portugal		Various locations	nextbike				
Portugal		Vila do Conde	biConde	3 Gen.		5 June 2014	
Portugal		Vilamoura	Vilamoura Public Bikes	3 Gen.		15 July 2012	
Qatar		Doha	Dott				
Romania		Alba Iulia	nextbike				
Romania		Bucharest	Cicloteque	Proprietary		31 July 2008	
Romania		Buzău	nextbike				
Romania		Câmpia Turzii	nextbike				
Romania		Drobeta	nextbike				
Romania		Focsani	nextbike				
Romania		Slatina	nextbike				
Romania		Topoloveni	nextbike				
Russia		Almetyevsk	Gobike			September 2017	
Russia		Kazan	Veli'k	3 Gen. Cyclocity	Russ Outdoor	1 July 2013	2019
Russia		Moscow	Velobike	Smoove (2014–2025)	CityBike	1 June 2013	
Russia		Saint Petersburg	Velogorod			July 2014	2020
Russia		Saint Petersburg	SmartBike	4 Gen.		May 2020	
Russia		Various locations	Whoosh	4 Gen.		2021	
Russia		Various locations	MTS Urent	4 Gen.		2018	
Rwanda		Kigali	Guraride		Guraride	9 September 2021	
Saudi Arabia		Riyadh, Andorra Village	TIER				
Saudi Arabia		Riyadh	Dott				
Serbia		Novi Sad	NS Bike	Parking Servis		2011	
Slovakia		Bratislava	Whitebikes	Open Source Bike Share		May 2014	
Slovakia		Bratislava	Slovnaft BAjk		Slovnaft	7 September 2018	
Slovakia		Bratislava	Verejný bicykel		Antik Telecom	1 June 2020	2024
Slovakia		Bratislava	Rekola	4 Gen.	Rekola	7 September 2020	
Slovakia		Humenné	Verejný bicykel		Antik Telecom	22 June 2021	
Slovakia		Košice	Verejný bicykel		Antik Telecom	24 April 2019	
Slovakia		Krásno nad Kysucou	Verejný bicykel		Antik Telecom	26 May 2021	
Slovakia		Kysucké Nové Mesto	Verejný bicykel		Antik Telecom	26 May 2021	
Slovakia		Moldava nad Bodvou	Verejný bicykel		Antik Telecom	25 July 2019	2024
Slovakia		Nitra	ARRIVA Bike	nextbike	Arriva	28 July 2017	
Slovakia		Poprad, Spišská Teplica	Verejný bicykel		Antik Telecom	8 August 2019; 14 May 2021	26 February 2024
Slovakia		Považská Bystrica	Verejný bicykel		Antik Telecom	17 June 2022	
Slovakia		Prešov	Verejný bicykel		Antik Telecom	6 July 2021	2025
Slovakia		Sabinov	Verejný bicykel		Antik Telecom	28 July 2021	
Slovakia		Sečovce	Verejný bicykel		Antik Telecom	30 June 2023	
Slovakia		Senec	nextbike				
Slovakia		Senica	nextbike				
Slovakia		Snina	Verejný bicykel		Antik Telecom	28 June 2021	
Slovakia		Svidník	Verejný bicykel		Antik Telecom	8 June 2021	
Slovakia		Svit	Verejný bicykel		Antik Telecom	14 May 2021	
Slovakia		Terchová	Verejný horský e-bicykel		Antik Telecom	28 April 2023	
Slovakia		Trebišov	Verejný bicykel		Antik Telecom	17 July 2019	
Slovakia		Trnava	Arboria bike		City of Trnava	1 March 2019	
Slovakia		Veľký Šariš	Verejný bicykel		Antik Telecom	24 June 2020	
Slovakia		Vranov nad Topľou	Verejný bicykel		Antik Telecom	15 June 2022	2024
Slovakia		Žilina	BikeKIA	nextbike	Arriva	29 March 2019	
Slovakia		Žilina	nextbike				
Slovenia		Celje	KolesCE		Nomago	13 September 2018	
Slovenia		Kamnik					
Slovenia		Kranj	KRsKOLESOM		Mestna občina Kranj		
Slovenia		Ljubljana	Bicike(lj)	Cyclocity	JCDecaux	12 May 2011	
Slovenia		Ljubljana	nextbike				
Slovenia		Novo Mesto	goNM				
Slovenia		Murska Sobota	Soboški biciklin				
Slovenia		Rogaška Slatina and Podčetrtek					
Slovenia		Velenje	BICY	MICikel		18 September 2012	
Slovenia		Various locations	nextbike				
South Africa		Orania, Northern Cape	Orania Openbare Fietsprojek			16 July 2014	
South Korea		Changwon	NUBIJA			October 2008	
South Korea		Daejeon	Tashu	Tashu	Daejeon Metropolitan Government, Daejeon Metropolitan City Facilities Management Corporation	13 October 2008	
South Korea		Sejong	Eouling	Eouling & New Eouling	Sejong City Transportation Corporation	28 October 2014	
South Korea		Seoul	Ddareungi			15 October 2015	
Spain		A Coruña	Bicicoruña				
Spain		Arteixo	nextbike				
Spain		Barcelona	Bicing	3 Gen. Clear CC		22 March 2007	
Spain		Barcelona	Bolt				
Spain		Barcelona	Donkey Republic				
Spain		Barcelona	RideMovi				
Spain		Province of Barcelona	Ambici	nextbike			
Spain		Bilbao	nextbike				
Spain		Biscay	nextbike				
Spain		Canary Islands	nextbike				
Spain		Córdoba	Eco-bici	3 Gen. Cyclocity	JCDecaux	2003	
Spain		Costa Adeje Region	Dott				
Spain		Elche (Elx)	bicielx			14 June 2010	
Spain		Estepona	Dott				
Spain		Gijón	Gijon bici			2003 (relaunched in 2023)	
Spain		Girona	Girocleta			25 September 2009	
Spain		Ibiza	nextbike				
Spain		Ibiza	Dott				
Spain		Las Palmas de Gran Canaria	nextbike				
Spain		León	nextbike				
Spain		Logroño	nextbike				
Spain		Madrid	BiciMAD			May 2014	
Spain		Málaga, Andalucía	MálagaBici	Cemusa		2013	November 2021
Spain		Málaga, Andalucía	Dott				
Spain		Mislata	nextbike				
Spain		Murcia, Region of Murcia	Muybici				
Spain		Ontinyent	nextbike				
Spain		Palma	Bicipalma	nextbike		28 March 2011	
Spain		Pamplona	n'bici			July 2007	
Spain		Santander	nextbike				
Spain		Santander	Tusbic	3 Gen. Cyclocity		September 2008	
Spain		Santa Cruz de Tenerife	Dott				
Spain		Tarragona	Dott				
Spain		Seville	Sevici	3 Gen. Cyclocity		April 2007	
Spain		Torrent	nextbike				
Spain		Urdaibai	nextbike				
Spain		Valencia	Valenbisi	3 Gen. Cyclocity	JCDecaux	22 June 2010	
Spain		Valladolid	Biki				
Spain		Zaragoza	Bizi	3 Gen. Clear CC		28 May 2008	
Sweden		Gothenburg	Bolt				
Sweden		Gothenburg	nextbike				
Sweden		Gothenburg	Styr & Ställ	3 Gen. Cyclocity	JCDecaux	10 August 2010	
Sweden		Lund	Lundahoj	3 Gen. Cyclocity	JCDecaux	20 August 2014	
Sweden		Malmö	Bolt				
Sweden		Malmö	Malmö By Bike	3 Gen. Clear CC		14 May 2016	
Sweden		Stockholm	RideMovi				
Sweden		Stockholm	Stockholm City Bikes	3 Gen. Clear CC		April 2006	
Sweden		Various locations	Donkey Republic				
Switzerland		Aigle, Monthey	PubliBike	PubliBike		2010	
Switzerland		Bern	PubliBike	PubliBike		2011	
Switzerland		Chur	MOOINZ	nextbike			
Switzerland		Freiburg	PubliBike	PubliBike		2010	
Switzerland		Geneva	Donkey Republic				
Switzerland		Lausanne	PubliBike	PubliBike		April 2013	
Switzerland		Lausanne	velopass			June 2009	April 2013
Switzerland		Lugano	PubliBike	PubliBike		2010	
Switzerland		Luzern	nextbike	3 Gen. nextbike		2008	
Switzerland		Nyon, Gland	PubliBike	PubliBike		2011	
Switzerland		Schaffhausen	TIER				
Switzerland		Sion	PubliBike	PubliBike		2010	
Switzerland		St. Gallen	TIER				
Switzerland		Uzwil	TIER				
Switzerland		Various locations	nextbike Switzerland				
Switzerland		Various locations	Donkey Republic				
Switzerland		Vevey	PubliBike	PubliBike		2009	
Switzerland		Winterthur	TIER				
Taiwan		Changhua	YouBike	1.0		22 May 2014	30 June 2021
Taiwan		Changhua	MOOVO			30 June 2021	
Taiwan		Kaohsiung	City Bike			1 March 2009	25 June 2020
Taiwan		Kaohsiung	YouBike	2.0		1 July 2020	
Taiwan		Kaohsiung	YouBike	2.0E		16 November 2022	
Taiwan		Taipei	YouBike	1.0		11 March 2009	3 November 2022
Taiwan		Taipei	YouBike	2.0		15 January 2020	
Taiwan		Taipei	YouBike	2.0E		30 August 2024	
Taiwan		New Taipei City	NewBike			31 October 2008	April 2015
Taiwan		New Taipei City	YouBike	1.0		1 January 2014	6 August 2024
Taiwan		New Taipei City	YouBike	2.0		20 October 2021	
Taiwan		New Taipei City	YouBike	2.0E		30 August 2024	
Taiwan		Taoyuan	YouBike	1.0		4 February 2016	31 August 2024
Taiwan		Taoyuan	YouBike	2.0		22 December 2023	
Taiwan		Taoyuan	YouBike	2.0E		1 February 2024	
Taiwan		Hsinchu County	YouBike	2.0		27 June 2022	
Taiwan		Hsinchu County	YouBike	2.0E		7 February 2024	
Taiwan		Hsinchu	YouBike	1.0		26 May 2016	1 June 2023
Taiwan		Hsinchu	YouBike	2.0		12 July 2022	
Taiwan		Hsinchu Science Park	YouBike	1.0		30 August 2017	1 June 2023
Taiwan		Hsinchu Science Park	YouBike	2.0		12 July 2022	
Taiwan		Hsinchu Science Park	YouBike	2.0E		8 January 2023	
Taiwan		Miaoli	YouBike	1.0		26 June 2018	
Taiwan		Miaoli	YouBike	2.0		13 March 2024	
Taiwan		Miaoli	YouBike	2.0E		13 March 2024	
Taiwan		Taichung	YouBike	1.0 (iBike)		18 July 2014	28 June 2023
Taiwan		Taichung	YouBike	2.0		18 December 2020	
Taiwan		Taichung	YouBike	2.0E		21 June 2022	
Taiwan		Chiayi	Chia e-bike			3 February 2016	8 April 2019
Taiwan		Chiayi	YouBike	2.0		15 December 2020	
Taiwan		Chiayi	YouBike	2.0E		1 December 2021	
Taiwan		Chiayi County	Youbike	2.0		3 July 2024	
Taiwan		Chiayi County	Youbike	2.0E		3 July 2024	
Taiwan		Tainan	T-Bike			8 August 2016	28 February 2023
Taiwan		Tainan	YouBike	2.0		23 February 2023	
Taiwan		Tainan	YouBike	2.0E		21 April 2023	
Taiwan		Pingtung City	Pbike			4 December 2014	28 February 2023
Taiwan		Pingtung City	YouBike	2.0		1 February 2023	
Taiwan		Pingtung City	YouBike	2.0E		24 April 2023	
Taiwan		Yunlin County	MOOVO			3 August 2023	
Taiwan		Kinmen	K Bike			16 April 2017	31 December 2023
Taiwan		Taitung City	YouBike	2.0		End of 2024	
Taiwan		Taitung City	YouBike	2.0E		End of 2024	
Thailand		Bangkok	KU Mobike	Mobike		2017	
Thailand		Bangkok	CU Bike	Smoove		2012	
Thailand		Bangkok	Pun Pun Bike Share			2012	
Thailand		Bangkok	oBike	4 Gen. oBike		July 2017	Discontinued
Thailand		Chiang Mai	Mobike	Mobike		2018	Discontinued
Turkey		Istanbul	İsbike			2012	
Turkey		İzmir	Bisim			January 2014	
Turkey		Karşıyaka	Karbis	3 Gen. nextbike		January 2014	
Turkey		Konya	nextbike	3 Gen. nextbike			
Ukraine		Kyiv	nextbike	3 Gen. nextbike	nextbike Kyiv LLC	15 August 2018	Discontinued
Ukraine		Lviv	nextbike	3 Gen. nextbike	nextbike Ukraine LLC	31 March 2016	Discontinued
United Arab Emirates		Abu Dhabi	ADCB Bikeshare	8D	Cyacle	December 2014	
United Arab Emirates		Dubai, Dubai Hills Mall	TIER				
United Arab Emirates		Dubai, Expo 2020 District	TIER				
United Arab Emirates		Ras Al-Khaimah	TIER				
United Arab Emirates		Sharjah, American University of Sharjah	TIER				
United Kingdom	England	Basildon	Dott				
United Kingdom	England	Bath	Dott				
United Kingdom	England	Bath	TIER				
United Kingdom	England	Barton-upon-Humber	Factory Bikes	WhiteBikes	Elswick Hopper	19??	19??
United Kingdom	England	Blackpool	Hire-a-Bike	Hourbike		2009	
United Kingdom	England	Braintree	Dott				
United Kingdom	England	Bristol	Dott				
United Kingdom	England	Bristol	TIER				
United Kingdom	England	Bristol	YoBike	YoBike		May 2017	
United Kingdom	England	Cambridge	GreenBike	WhiteBikes		1993	1995
United Kingdom	England	Chelmsford	Dott				
United Kingdom	England	Colchester	Dott				
United Kingdom	England	Colchester	TIER				
United Kingdom	England	Derby	Lime				
United Kingdom	England	Greater Manchester	GM Cycle Hire		Beryl	November 2021	
United Kingdom	England	Liverpool	City Bike			May 2014	July 2022
United Kingdom	England	London	Santander Cycles (formerly Barclays Cycle Hire)	PBSC & 8D	Serco	30 July 2010	
United Kingdom	England	London	TIER				
United Kingdom	England	Leicester	Santander Cycles Leicester		RideOn	14 April 2021	2023
United Kingdom	England	Milton Keynes	Santander Cycles MK	3 Gen. nextbike	CycleSaviours	17 June 2016	
United Kingdom	England	Milton Keynes	TIER				
United Kingdom	England	Milton Keynes	Dott				
United Kingdom	England	Newcastle	ScratchBikes (known as WhipBikes until 2011)	ScratchBikes		2010	
United Kingdom	England	Nottingham	Ucycle	Sustrans & Evans Cycles		2010	
United Kingdom	England	Portsmouth	Bikeabout	Public Velo	University of Portsmouth	1996	1998
United Kingdom	England	Slough	Smoove	3 Gen. Smoove		November 2013	
United Kingdom	England	Southampton	YoBike	YoBike		September 2017	
United Kingdom	Northern Ireland	Belfast	Belfast Bikes	3 Gen. nextbike	NSL	27 April 2015	
United Kingdom	Scotland	Dundee	Embark Dundee		RideOn		
United Kingdom	Scotland	Edinburgh	Just Eat Cycles	Urban Sharing	Serco	24 June 2018	
United Kingdom	Scotland	Glasgow	Mass Automated Cycle Hire (MACH)	3 Gen. nextbike		24 June 2014	
United Kingdom	Wales	Cardiff	Nextbike	3 Gen. nextbike		March 2018	December 2023
United States	Alaska	Fairbanks	Fairbikes	A2B Bikeshare		24 September 2015	
United States	Arizona	Phoenix	Grid Bike Share	3 Gen. CycleHop and Social Bicycles		25 November 2014	
United States	Arkansas	Bentonville	Bentonville BCycle				
United States	California	Encinitas	Encinitas BCycle				
United States	California	Fullerton	OCTA BikeShare	Bike Nation		6 January 2014	
United States	California	Los Angeles	Metro Bike Share	3 Gen. B-Cycle		7 July 2016	
United States	California	Redding	Redding Bikeshare				
United States	California	San Diego	DecoBike	DecoBike	JCDecaux	February 2015	
United States	California	San Francisco Bay Area	Bay Wheels	8D	Motivate	June 2017	
United States	California	Santa Barbara	Santa Barbara BCycle				
United States	California	Santa Cruz	Santa Cruz BCycle				
United States	California	Santa Monica	Breeze Bike Share	3 Gen. CycleHop and Social Bicycles		13 August 2015	
United States	California	Truckee	Truckee BCycle				
United States	Colorado	Aspen	WE-cycle	PBSC		June 2013	
United States	Colorado	Boulder	Boulder B-Cycle	3 Gen. B-Cycle		2011	
United States	Colorado	Denver	Denver B-cycle	3 Gen. B-Cycle		2010	January 2020
United States	Colorado	Meridian	M-Bike	Zagster		15 March 2010	
United States	Georgia	Atlanta	Relay Bike Share			May 2016	
United States	Georgia	Savannah	CAT Bike	3 Gen. B-Cycle		24 January 2014	
United States	Hawaii	Honolulu	Biki				
United States	Hawaii	Kailua	Hawaii B-cycle	3 Gen. B-Cycle		2011	Discontinued
United States	Hawaii	Kona District		PBSC		2016	
United States	Idaho	Boise	Boise Bike Share	Social Bicycle		16 April 2015	September 2020
United States	Illinois	Chicago	Divvy	PBSC & 8D	Motivate	2013	
United States	Indiana	Indianapolis	Indiana Pacers Bikeshare	B-Cycle	Indianapolis Cultural Trail	22 April 2014	
United States	Iowa	Des Moines	Des Moines B-cycle	3 Gen. B-Cycle		2010	
United States	Florida	Aventura	Aventura BCycle				
United States	Florida	Fort Lauderdale, Broward County	Broward B-Cycle	3 Gen. B-Cycle		2011	
United States	Florida	Miami Beach	Decobike	SandVault		2011	
United States	Florida	Tampa	Coast Bike Share	3 Gen. CycleHop and Social Bicycles		7 December 2014	
United States	Massachusetts	Boston	Bluebikes	PBSC & 8D	Motivate	2011	
United States	Massachusetts	Springfield and Pioneer Valley	ValleyBike Share		Begwegen Technologies	28 June 2018	
United States	Michigan	Ann Arbor	ArborBike	3 Gen. B-Cycle		2014	Discontinued
United States	Michigan	Battle Creek	Battle Creek BCycle	3 Gen. B-Cycle		19 August 2013	Discontinued
United States	Michigan	Lansing	Capital Community Bikeshare	A2B Bikeshare		2014	
United States	Minnesota	Minneapolis–Saint Paul	Nice Ride Minnesota	PBSC & 8D		2010	13 November 2022
United States	Minnesota	St. Paul	Yellow Bike Project	1 Gen. w/ BikeCard	volunteers and city council	1997	
United States	Missouri	Jackson County	Jackson County BCycle				
United States	Missouri	Kansas City	Kansas City B-cycle	3 Gen. B-Cycle		2012	Discontinued
United States	Nebraska	Lincoln	BikeLNK	3 Gen. B-Cycle		2018	
United States	Nebraska	Omaha / Council Bluffs, Iowa	Heartland Bike Share	3 Gen. B-Cycle		2011	
United States	Nebraska	Valentine	Valentine Bike Share	BCycle			
United States	Nevada	Black Rock City	Yellow Bikes	Yellow Bikes			
United States	Nevada	Las Vegas	RTC Bike Share	B-Cycle			
United States	New Jersey	Hoboken	Hudson Bike Share	3 Gen. nextbike		September 2015	
United States	New Jersey	Jersey City	Citi Bike	8D	Motivate	September 2015	
United States	New York	New York City	Citi Bike	PBSC & 8D	Motivate	27 May 2013	
United States	North Carolina	Charlotte	Charlotte B-Cycle	3 Gen. B-Cycle		2012	
United States	North Dakota	Bismarck	BisParks BCycle				
United States	North Dakota	Fargo	GreatRides	3 Gen. B-Cycle		15 March 2010	Discontinued
United States	Ohio	Cincinnati	Red Bike	3 Gen. B-Cycle		15 September 2014	
United States	Ohio	Columbus	CoGo	PBSC & 8D	Motivate	July 2013	28 February 2025
United States	Oklahoma	Oklahoma City	Spokies	Spokies		2012	
United States	Oregon	Eugene	PeaceHealth Rides	PeaceHealth Rides		2018	
United States	Oregon	Portland	Biketown			19 July 2016	
United States	Oregon	Portland	Yellow Bike Project	1 Gen. WhiteBikes	Yellow Bike Project	1994	1997
United States	Pennsylvania	Philadelphia	Indego	3 Gen. B-Cycle (incl. some e-bikes		23 April 2015	
United States	Pennsylvania	Pittsburgh	POGOH	PBSC		2022	
United States	South Carolina	Columbia	BlueBikeSC		Bbewege	September 2018	
United States	South Carolina	Greenville	Greenville BCycle				
United States	South Carolina	Spartanburg	Spartanburg B-Cycle	3 Gen. B-Cycle		2011	Discontinued
United States	Tennessee	Chattanooga	Bike Chattanooga Bicycle Transit System	PBSC		2012	
United States	Tennessee	Clarksville	Clarksville BCycle				
United States	Tennessee	Memphis	Explore Bike Share				
United States	Tennessee	Nashville	Nashville BCycle				
United States	Texas	Austin	CapMetro	3 Gen. B-Cycle		December 2013	
United States	Texas	Austin	Yellow Bike Project	WhiteBikes	Austin YBP and city council	January 1997	
United States	Texas	El Paso	El Paso BCycle	3 Gen. B-Cycle		14 September 2015	
United States	Texas	Fort Worth	Fort Worth B-Cycle	3 Gen. B-Cycle		22 April 2013	
United States	Texas	Houston	Houston Bcycle	3 Gen. B-Cycle		2012	30 June 2024
United States	Texas	San Antonio	San Antonio B-Cycle	3 Gen. B-Cycle		2011	
United States	Texas	Weslaco	RGV B-cycle				
United States	Utah	Salt Lake City	GREENbike	3 Gen. B-Cycle		2013	
United States	Washington	Seattle	Pronto Cycle Share	8D	Motivate	13 October 2014	31 March 2017
United States	Washington metropolitan area		Capital Bikeshare	PBSC & 8D	Motivate	2010	
United States	Wisconsin	Madison	Madison B-Cycle	3 Gen. B-Cycle		2011	
United States	Wisconsin	Milwaukee	Bublr Bikes	3 Gen. B-Cycle		2014	
Uzbekistan		Tashkent	Q.watt	4 Gen.		2024	

== Europe ==
The advertising company JCDecaux launched its "Cyclocity" programs initially in Vienna, Austria in 2003 and in Lyon, France in 2005. The company also started programs in other cities in Europe such as Paris, Córdoba, and Kazan, as well as cities outside of Europe, such as Brisbane, Australia. Smart cards are used to pay for use of the bikes.

Competitor Clear Channel, then operating as Adshel, opened the first example of this in Rennes in 1997, and has several other sites including Oslo, Stockholm, Sandnes and Trondheim, most generally similar to that offered by their competitor.

A different financial model called bicing is used in Barcelona, which is paid for by car owners parking on public streets and not by advertising – which is contracted to JCDecaux in some places.

=== France ===
French cities not included in the list above offering a bicycle-sharing system include Lorient, Annemasse, Auch, and Aix-en-Provence.

=== Netherlands ===
In 1965, the group Provo painted fifty bicycles white and scattered them unlocked in downtown Amsterdam for everyone to use freely. The bicycles were both stolen as well as impounded by the authorities, as a city ordinance forbade leaving unlocked bikes in public places.

In September 1997, a pilot project for a public share system, based on the UK's Grippa racks was established in Rotterdam for use by commuters but it was terminated the following year due to poor functionality of the electronic bike racks.

=== Norway ===
The first Norwegian bicycle-sharing system was introduced in Sandnes in 1996. It consisted of 225 green DBS bikes that were free to use in the fashion of a first generation bicycle-sharing system. The Sandnes system was converted to a third generation automated system in 2002. In 1998, Trondheim introduced a second generation system with 200 bicycles modeled after that of Copenhagen's. The Trondheim system was converted into a third-generation system in 2005.

The following cities are known to have city bike arrangements. Some are prepaid automatic (for example Oslo), and some are manual (Tønsberg). In 2001, Drammen introduced a third-generation system together with Clear Channel. Bergen, the second-largest city in Norway, has occasionally had city bikes, and as of 2018 and 2019 opened a new and improved system based on the system in Oslo together with OBOS and Urban Infrastructure Partner.

- Bergen
- Drammen
- Oslo - Oslo Bysykkel (249 rental hubs as of April 2021)
- Sandnes (no longer operating, now served by kolumbus bysykkel))
- Rogaland - Kolumbus Bysykkel (Covers several municipalities in Rogaland for example Stavanger and Sandnes). it is managed by the transit agency of Rogaland and is integrated in the transit ticketing app and you get 15 minutes for free if you have a ticket.
- Trondheim
- Tønsberg

=== Portugal ===
Portugal has several bike-share systems implemented in various cities and towns. The largest is Lisbon's GIRA public bike share system, a hybrid system currently operating with 700 pedelec and conventional bicycles served by 91 stations. As of 2021, a large expansion of Lisbon's bike share system is underway, expected to duplicate both fleet and coverage. Other systems with reasonable urban coverage for the size of their operating areas are those of Vilamoura with 260 bicycles and 43 stations, Torres Vedras with 260 bicycles and 20 stations, and Vila do Conde with 60 bicycles and 12 stations. The town of Cascais with Portugal's second largest bike-sharing system has a relatively adequate geographical coverage of the municipality, but operating hours are limited (from 7 a.m. to 8 p.m.), some stations have few or no bicycles available for long periods of time, and operations were suspended during 15 months, from the onset of the COVID-19 pandemic in mid-March 2020 until June 2021, when the system was gradually reactivated. Other systems are being implemented in various towns nationwide, mostly in towns along the central and northern coastal areas and in the Azores.

=== Romania ===
Timișoara is the first Romanian city to introduce a public rent-a-bike system. The scheme is called VeloTM and has 25 stations and 300 bikes. The rent-a-bike system works with the RATT card. Renting a bike is free; however, there is a fee for the card.

=== Russian Federation ===
Automated public bicycle-sharing systems in Russia operate in various Russian cities, including but not limited to Moscow, Saint Petersburg, Kazan and Almetyevsk (Tatarstan). The system in Moscow is steadily expanding each year while the systems in Saint Petersburg and Kazan were struggling to survive, and closed later. The system in Almetyevsk is dockless with about 300 pre-marked parking lots across the town where the bicycles must be left after use. A couple of smaller-scale dockless systems are deployed in Adlersky City District in Sochi. Later, Russia's large kick-sharing companies, Whoosh and MTS Urent, joined the competition by offering their dockless e-bikes.

Dockless e-bikes in Moscow

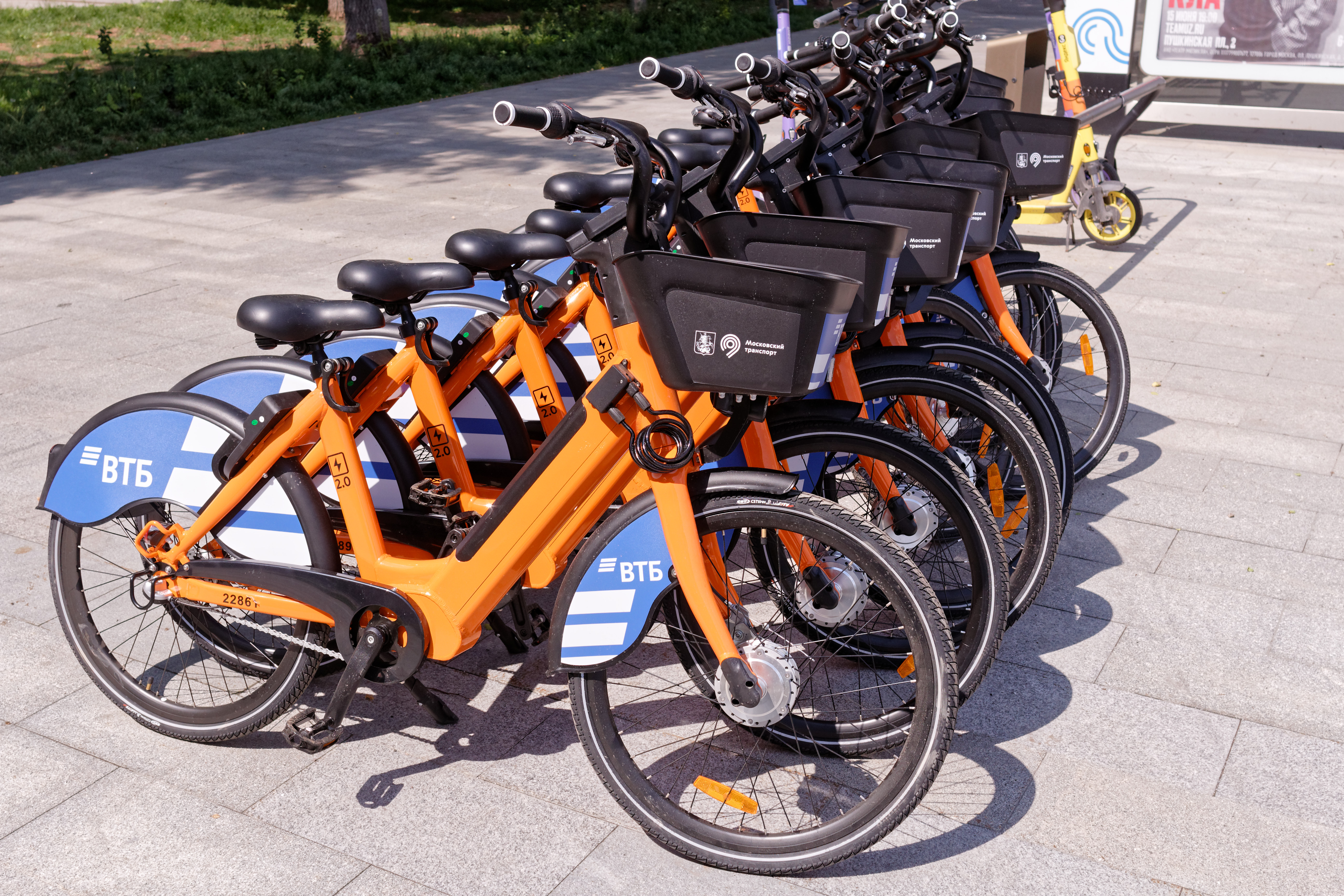
Velobike e-bikes

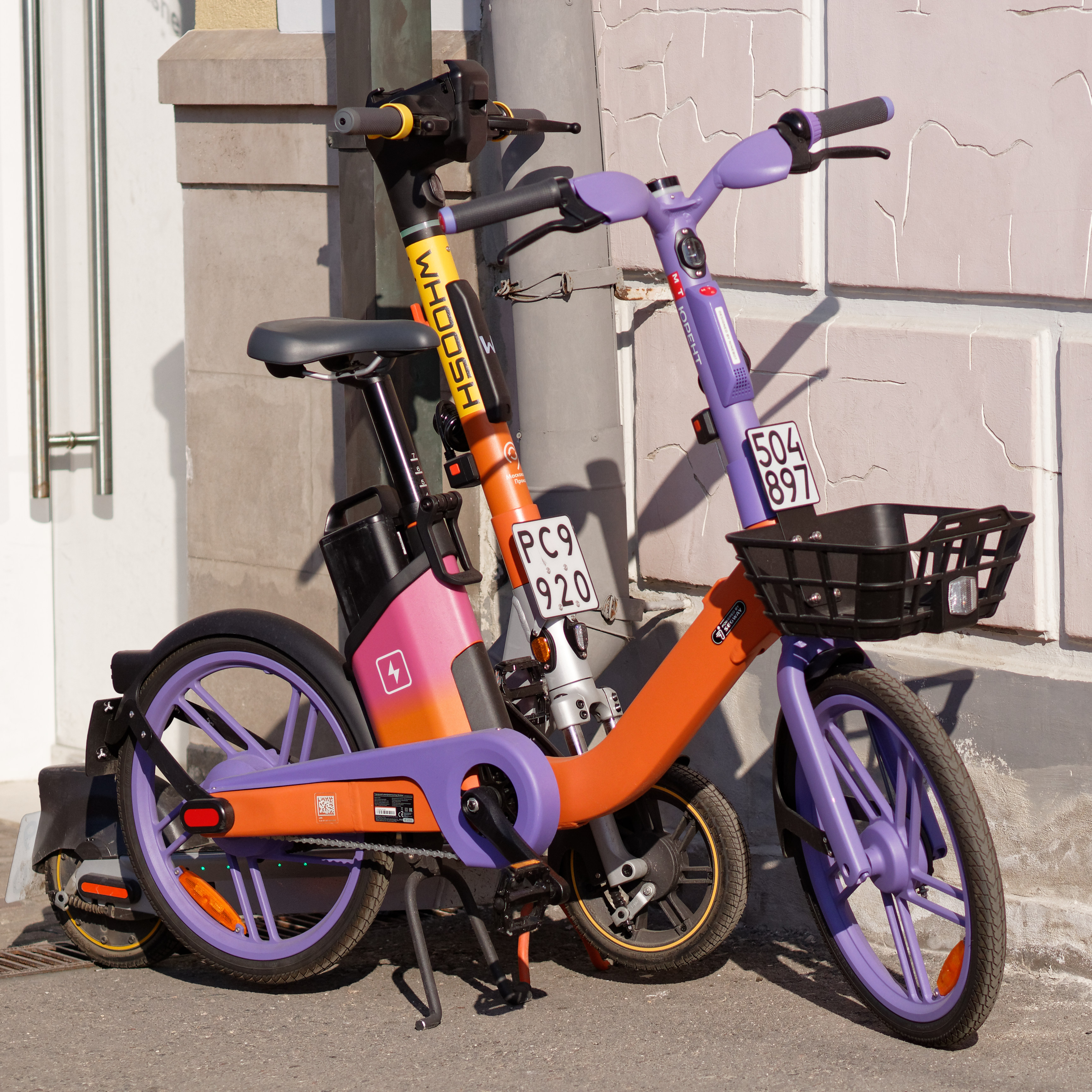
Urent (previously URentBike) e-bikes

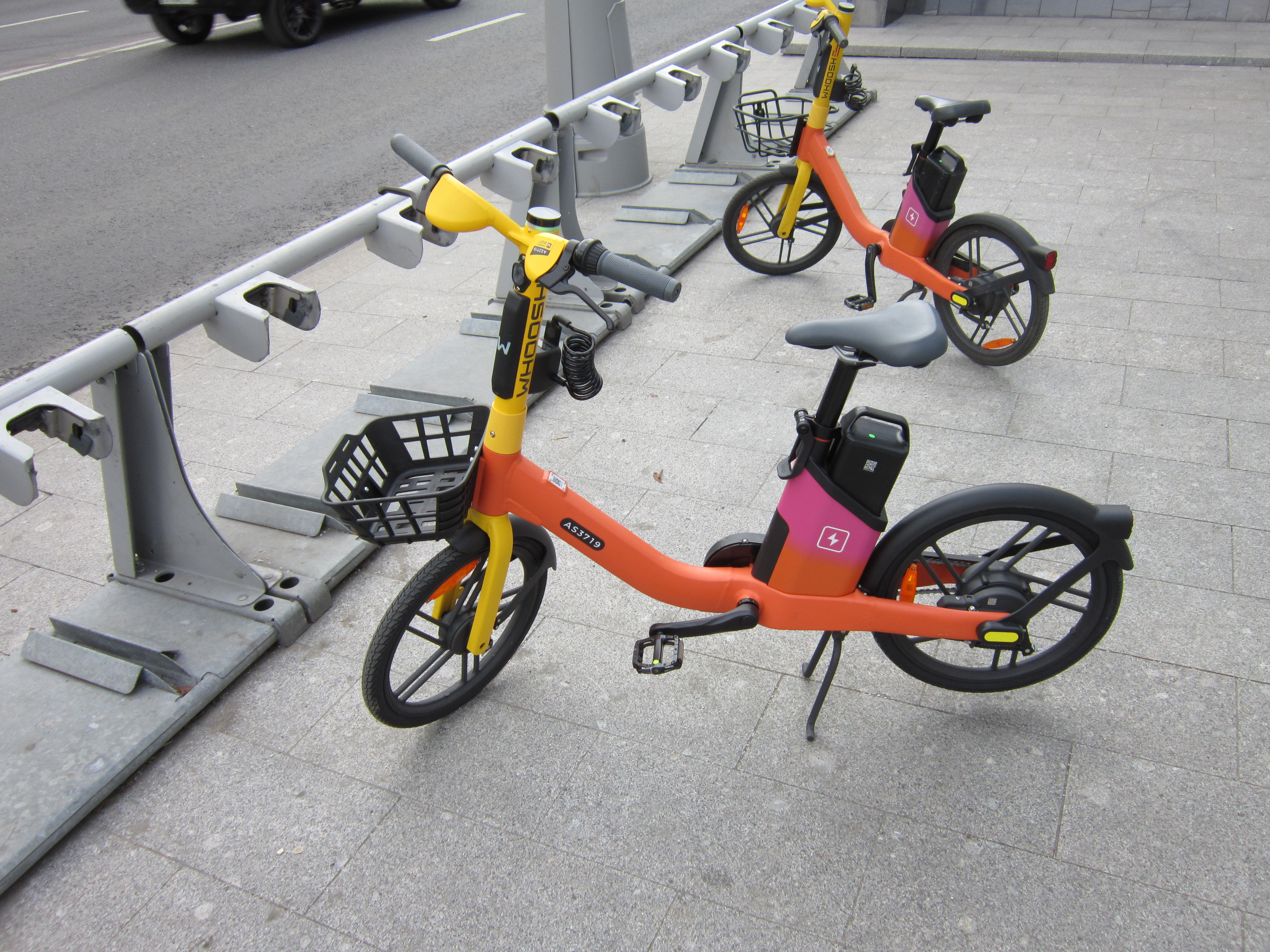
Whoosh e-bikes

==== Velobike ====
===== Moscow and Moscow Oblast =====
The Velobike system debuted in 2013. In 2015 it was fully replaced by the Smoove-based solution using B'TWIN bicycles. In 2018 there were 430 parking stations in the system with 4300 bicycles. There were 424,736 registered users and 4.25 million trips taken that year.

In 2022, Velobike launched in Moscow Oblast.

In 2023, Velobike launched dockless e-bikes.

===== Murmansk =====
In 2020, Velobike opened in Murmansk, making it the northernmost bicycle-sharing system in the world. There were 10 stations in the city centre.

In 2023, however, Velobike ceased operations in Murmansk, and the other operator was launched.

===== Nizhny Novgorod =====
In August 2020 Velobike opened in Nizhny Novgorod. However, the service was closed in 2022 due to low demand.

===== Tyumen =====
In 2021, Velobike was launched in Tyumen. However, the contract with the city of Tyumen was cancelled by the city in 2023.

==== Saint Petersburg ====
In 2020, the Smart Bike system was launched in Saint Petersburg. SmartBike, a privately owned dockless system, replaced the Velogorod station-based system.

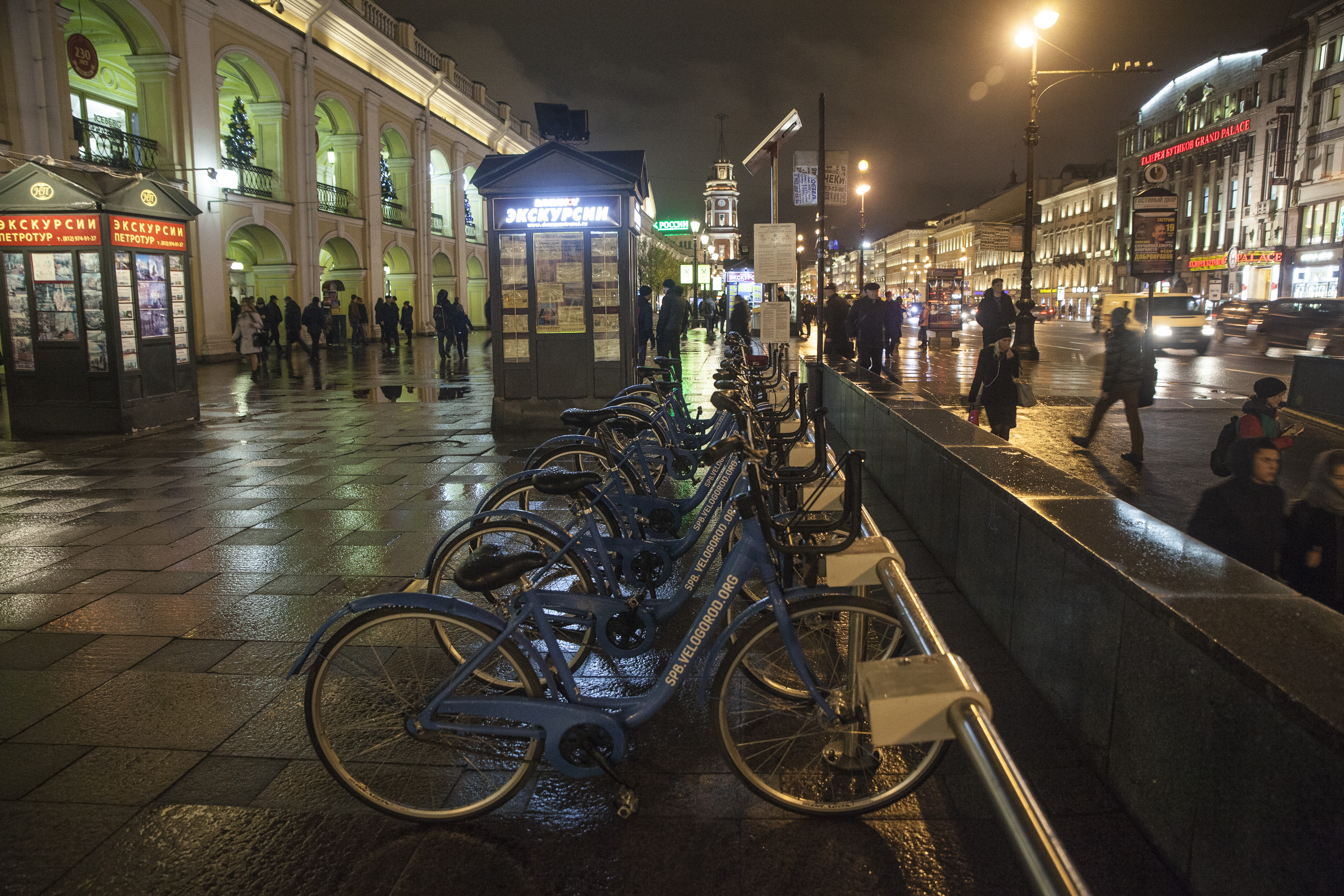
Velogorod in 2015

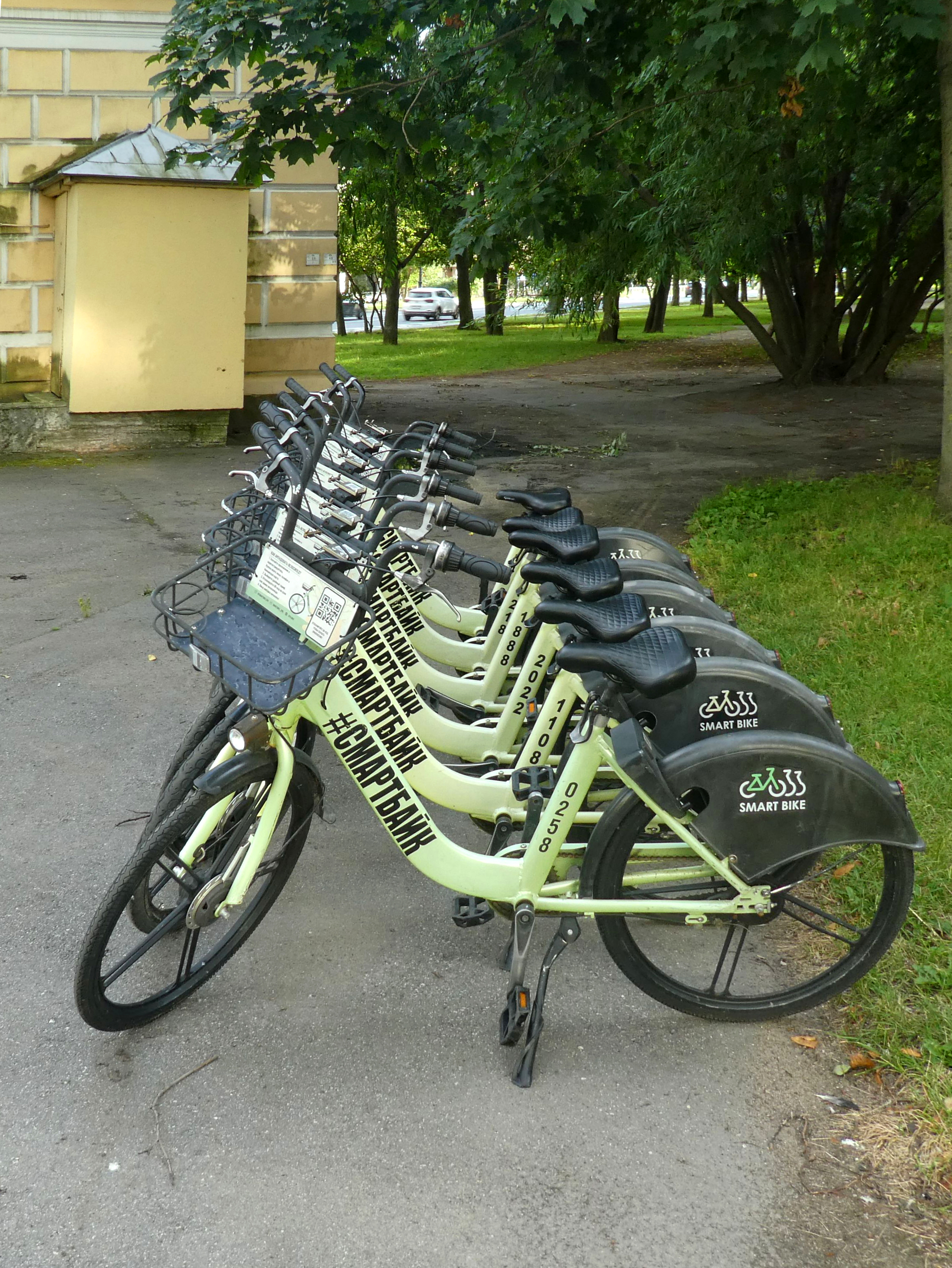
SmartBike bicycles on Bolshoi Prospekt (Vasilyevsky Island), 2025

==== Mobee network ====
The Russian-based Mobee bike-sharing company operates a few dockless bicycle-sharing networks. As of 2019, it has opened in three cities: Sochi, Volgograd and Saratov.

=== Slovakia ===
In 2001, the not-for-profit organization BiCyBa released white bicycles into public use in Bratislava, Slovakia. During the next three months, all the bikes were stolen or destroyed and the project was cancelled.

In 2013, a new community-run bike-sharing program in Bratislava called White Bikes commenced service with about 100 bikes (donated by the local Rotary Club) and over 60 stations as of December 2017. It is built on the Open Source Bike Share System based on SMS and a web app. It was started in 2013 by BikeKitchen initiative and cycling advocacy NGO Cyklokoalicia. There is no fee; membership is granted after initial introduction and training. Bikes are available year-round.

The official Bratislava city bike-sharing system Slovnaft Bajk was launched on 7 September 2018 in cooperation with Slovnaft. It initially offered under 100 bicycles at around 80 stations. The number of bicycles increased to around 190 later, but users complained about the UX, broken bicycles, and the rental process. An estimated 23% of bicycles were non-functional or inaccessible for rental. Another free-floating bike sharing system, Rekola, from the Czech Republic was launched in September 2020.

The first commercial bike-sharing system in Slovakia was launched in 2016 in the city of Prievidza. Zelený bicykel (Green bicycle) has 19 stations and was expected to add 10 more in 2018. Bikes are not available during the winter season.

Public transportation company Arriva launched a bike-sharing system in Nitra in 2017. It is a complementary service for bus riders. It features seven docking stations. The price is €25 per year, €3 per day or €0.50 per hour. Bikes are not available during the winter season.

Another commercial floating bike-sharing system was launched by a telecom provider, Antik Telecom, in Košice in May 2019. They introduced their system to the districts of Rača and Vajnory in Bratislava in June 2020.

=== Spain ===
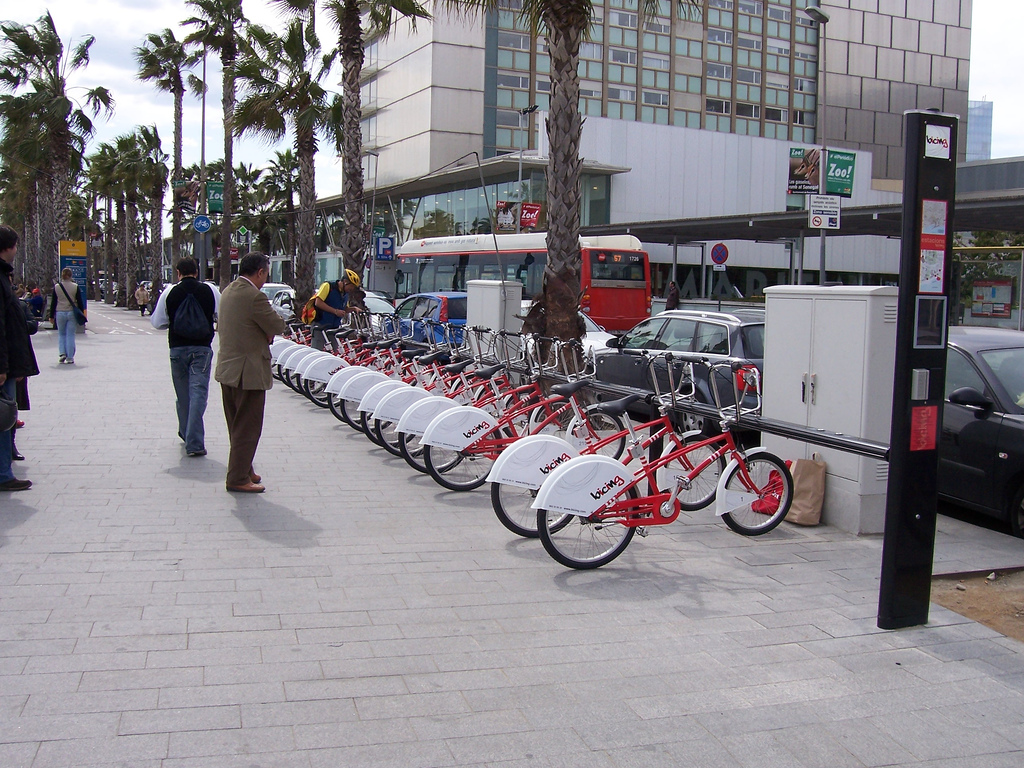
Bicing in Barcelona.

The Ayuntamiento de Burgos runs a bike-sharing program in BiciBur, with 23 locations, most with positions for ten bikes. Membership is €15 per year.

=== Sweden ===
The Stockholm City Bikes system has more than 80 stands and 1,000 bikes. The system functions from April to October.

The bike sharing system in Gothenburg, known as Styr & ställ, was launched in August 2010. The system has 60 stations and 1,000 bikes.

=== Switzerland ===
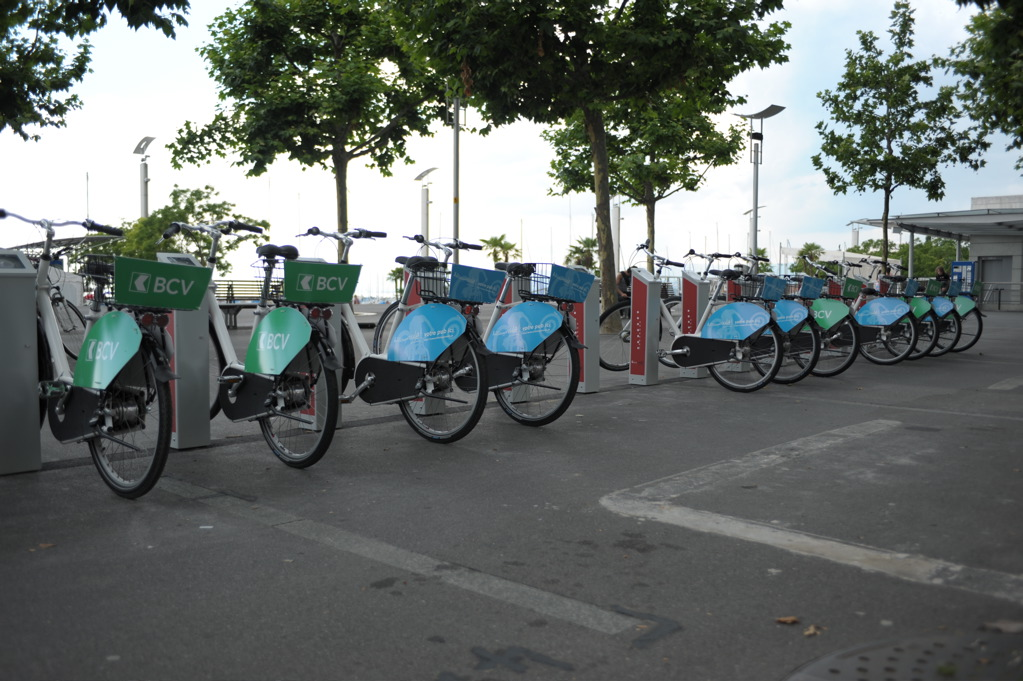
A bicycle sharing station in Lausanne (Switzerland).

Switzerland possesses several bicycle-sharing systems including PubliBike, Smide, and oBike, which was launched in Zurich on 5 July 2017.

The PubliBike network consists of more than 500 stations and 5000 Bikes throughout the country. It includes nine stations on the Lausanne campus. oBike is said to have deployed 350 bikes in the city of Zurich at a rate of CHF 1.50 for 30 minutes, with a required CHF 129 deposit. The city of Zürich also has a free bike-rental program, "Züri rollt", with several pick-up and drop-off locations.

=== United Kingdom ===
==== England ====
In 1993, a Green Bike Scheme bike sharing programme was initiated in Cambridge, United Kingdom, using a fleet of some 300 bicycles. The overwhelming majority of bicycles in the fleet were stolen or missing within a year of the programme's introduction, and the Green Bike Scheme was abandoned.

In an attempt to overcome losses from theft, bike sharing programmes adopted a so-called 'smart technology'. One of the first 'smart bike' programmes was the Grippa™ bike storage rack system used in Portsmouth's Bikeabout scheme. The Bikeabout scheme was launched in October 1995 by the University of Portsmouth, UK, as part of its Green Transport Plan in an effort to cut car travel by staff and students between campus sites. The Bikeabout scheme was a "smart card" fully automated system. For a small fee, users were issued 'smart cards' with magnetic stripes to be swiped through an electronic card reader at a covered 'bike store' kiosk, unlocking the bike from its storage rack. CCTV camera surveillance was installed at all bike stations in an effort to limit vandalism. Upon arriving at the destination station, the smart card was used to open a cycle rack and record the bike's safe return. A charge was automatically registered on the user's card if the bike was returned with damage or if the time exceeded the three-hour maximum. Implemented with an original budget of approximately £200,000, the Portsmouth Bikeabout scheme was never very successful in terms of rider usage, (Note: The Portsmouth Bikeabout programme never exceeded 500 users at any time during its operational existence.) in part due to the limited number of bike kiosks and hours of operation. Seasonal weather restrictions and concerns over unjustified charges for bike damage also imposed barriers to usage. The Bikeabout program was discontinued by the university in 1998 in favour of expanded minibus service; the total costs of the Bikeabout programme were never disclosed. Following the discontinuation of the University of Portsmouth's Bikeabout programme in 1998 (it had been launched in 1996), the introduction of new bicycle share systems proceeded more slowly in the United Kingdom than in the rest of Europe.

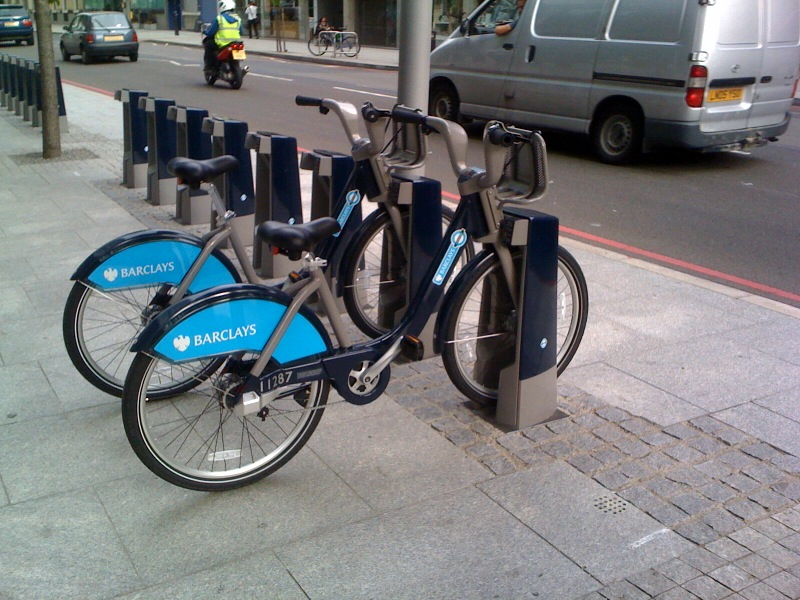
Barclays Cycle Hire, London, UK started in 2010.

In 2007, (another source gives early 2008) London mayor Ken Livingstone promised that an extensive bicycle-sharing system modelled on the Paris Vélib' system would be introduced in London during his final term in office. The scheme was not completed until Boris Johnson was in office, and consequently became known informally as "Boris Bikes". With initial sponsorship from Barclays and later Santander, Transport for London launched the scheme in 2010. Hire under 30 minutes is free from special bicycle stands across the city, after a daily, monthly, or annual charge has been paid.

Outside London, the largest bicycle-sharing scheme is the hire-a-bike operation in Blackpool, operated by Hourbike, with 60 stations and 500 bikes. This scheme uses both RFID membership cards and instant point-of-sale memberships for both residential users and visitors. Hourbike also has schemes in Lincoln, Reading, Liverpool, Nottingham, and Southport in England as well as Dumfries, Scotland.

In 2017, ofo, a Beijing-based bike share company, announced plans to provide shared bike services to several British cities. In 2018, the company withdrew service to several British towns and reduced service area coverage to others as part of a global restructuring plan.

In May 2017, Bristol became the first European city to have a hire-a-bike system operated by YoBike.

Some bike-sharing schemes use mobile phone apps to reserve or sign out bikes. In the UK, OYBike ran small-scale operations at two universities, three business parks, three London boroughs, and a private hotel chain in London until 2011. Like Munich's Call-a-Bike, OYBike used mobile phone technology to log use and charge for hires and could set up hire points in as little as 10 minutes.

Brompton Bike Hire has 40 docks across 25 major locations in the UK, starting at £2.50 for 24 hours. It uses the same hardware as BIXI Montréal, and members can rent a folding Brompton bike. The locations of the docks include London, Birmingham, Manchester, Bristol, Reading, Southampton, and Oxford.

In 2018 the Singaporean-based company oBike launched in London, with 400 dockless bikes and was anticipated to spread to other cities in the UK. In the UK, oBike's bike hire is 50p for 30 minutes, with a required £49 deposit.

In June 2019, bicycle light company Beryl launched a dockless cycle share scheme in Bournemouth and Poole, which was extended to Christchurch the following year. Beryl also operates schemes in Hereford, Norwich, Watford and the Isle of Wight.

In June 2021, Transport for Greater Manchester announced Beryl as the delivery partner to design, install and operate a 24/7, docked public cycle hire scheme made up of an initial 1,500 bikes and e-bikes at over 200 docking stations across Manchester, Trafford and Salford, in Greater Manchester. The scheme was scheduled to launch in November 2021.

==== Northern Ireland ====
Belfast launched a public bike hire scheme on 27 April 2015. The scheme was sponsored by Coca-Cola HBC Northern Ireland and is called Coca-Cola Zero Belfast Bikes. The Department for Regional Development (DRD) provided initial capital funding for the scheme as part of their Active Travel Demonstration Projects budget. NSL oversees the daily operation of the scheme, while Nextbike is responsible for the bikes. There are 33 docking stations with options for expansion depending on securing additional resources and council approval.

==== Scotland ====
Recent expansions to cities in Scotland included Glasgow and Stirling. Stirling's scheme was named "Pedalforth" following a competition in the community and comprises 100 bikes and 11 stations. Glasgow was provided with 400 bikes across 31 stations in 2014. In addition to this, in 2018, Edinburgh launched its own cycle hire scheme in partnership with Just Eat, titled Just Eat Cycles.

==== Wales ====
Cardiff

Nextbike started a public bike hire scheme operating in Cardiff on 26 March 2018, with five docking stations and 50 bicycles. The original plan was to have the public bike hire scheme operating in Cardiff by Autumn 2017 and to have 500 cycles at over 50 docking stations in the city. It came six years after OYBike ended a smaller scheme (with 10 stations), following the council's withdrawal of funding in 2011. On 7 December 2023 it was announced that Nextbike would be discontinuing the scheme on the 31st due to vandisation and theft.

Swansea

Santander began a bike sharing scheme in Swansea in the summer of 2018. Initially, there were five docking station, with a sixth later being added in Mumbles. The scheme has proven popular and there are prospects of expanding the service in the city.

== North America ==
=== Canada ===
==== Montréal, QC ====
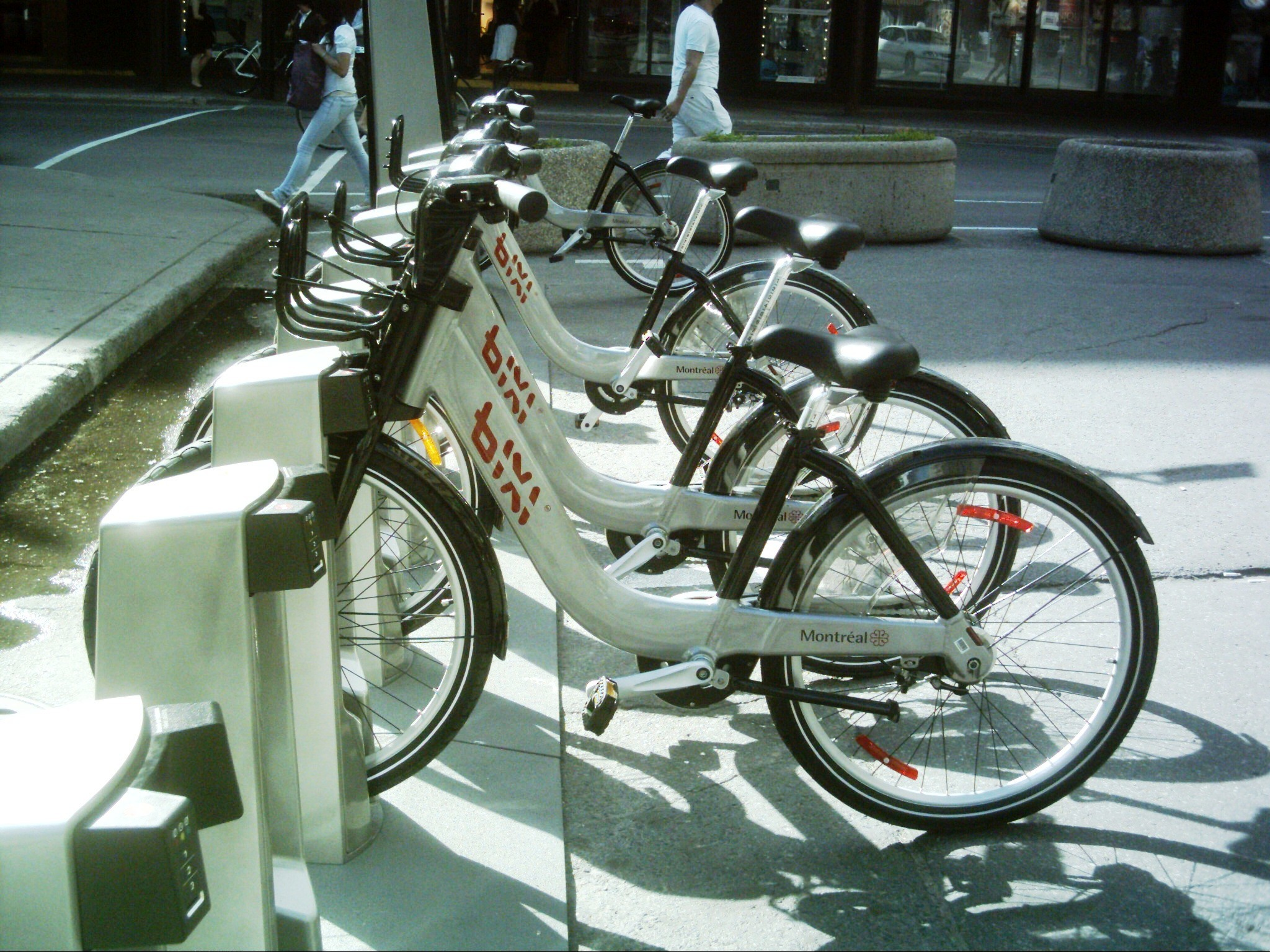
BIXI Montréal, Quebec (Canada).

The first widely deployed bicycle-sharing system in Montréal was BIXI Montréal, launched in 2009. It expanded to 6200 bicycles at 540 stations, making it the largest bicycle-sharing system, alongside the one in Toronto. Although initial program costs were $15 million for planning and implementation of the Bixi project, subsequent expenses incurred in expanding the program have driven costs upwards of $23 million. The system was developed by PBSC Urban Solutions along with a consortium of vendors. The BIXI technology was later used in bike sharing systems in North America, Europe and Australia. The Montreal system was ranked by Time magazine as the 19th best invention of 2008. As of 2024, Bixi has more than 10,000 bikes, 2 600 of which are e-bikes and 900 stations.

==== Quebec City, QC ====
àVélo launched in 2021 with 100 pedal assist bikes and 10 stations. As of 2023, àVélo has 780 pedal assist bikes and 74 stations.

==== Hamilton, ON ====
Sobi Hamilton launched in March 2015 with 750 bicycles at over 100 stations.

==== Ottawa, ON ====
The Bixi system was implemented in June 2009 in Ottawa/Gatineau as Capital Bixi. It launched in 2009 as a pilot program with 100 bicycles and 10 stations. In 2012, it was expanded to 250 bicycles and 25 stations. Its owner, the NCC, sold it to US-based CycleHop in April 2014 when its operator, Montreal-based Public Bike System Company, filed for bankruptcy protection in January 2014. CycleHop renamed the service to VeloGo and replaced the fleet with 'smart' bicycles, where GPS tracking is built into each bicycle, instead of relying on base stations, as with Bixi system. VeloGo began its service in the summer of 2015.

==== Toronto, ON ====
From 2001 to 2006, BikeShare, operated by the Community Bicycle Network (CBN) in Toronto, was for a time the most popular community bicycle-sharing program in North America. BikeShare was intended to overcome some of the theft issues by requiring yearly memberships to sign out any of the 150 refurbished yellow bikes locked up at 16 hubs throughout central Toronto. At its height, over 400 members could sign out a bike from any hub for up to three days. The hubs were located at stores, cafes, and community centres where the staff would volunteer their time to sign bikes out and in. Despite steadily increasing administrative, implementation, and maintenance costs, CBN could only charge users around 20 percent of actual costs, as users were unlikely to spend more than $50 per year for a membership. Without sufficient funds in the form of private and government grants, CBN discontinued BikeShare in 2006.

Bixi Toronto launched in 2011 with 800 bicycles at 80 stations. In 2013, when Public Bike System Company acknowledged that it could not repay its $3.9 million loan to the city, the system was taken over by the Toronto Parking Authority and renamed Bike Share Toronto. In 2016, the city of Toronto signed a contract with PBSC to expand their system. Its network hosts 6,850 bicycles spread among 625 stations.

==== Vancouver, BC ====
In July 2016, Vancouver installed a bike sharing system, Mobi, operated by CycleHop Corp. Mobi launched with 1500 bicycles at 150 stations.

==== Victoria, BC ====
In September 2017 a dockless bike share became available in the city of Victoria, starting with 150 bicycles. The dockless bike share was operated by U-Bicycle, but disappeared from the city's streets after a couple of years.

==== Edmonton, AB ====
From 2005 to 2008, a largely unregulated bike sharing program was operated by the Peoples' Pedal organisation in Edmonton, Alberta. The program suffered from high theft and vandalism rates, with 95% of the bikes that had been placed into service stolen or missing by 2008.

=== Costa Rica ===
Cartago, east of San José, Costa Rica, started a bikeshare program in 2017.

=== Mexico ===
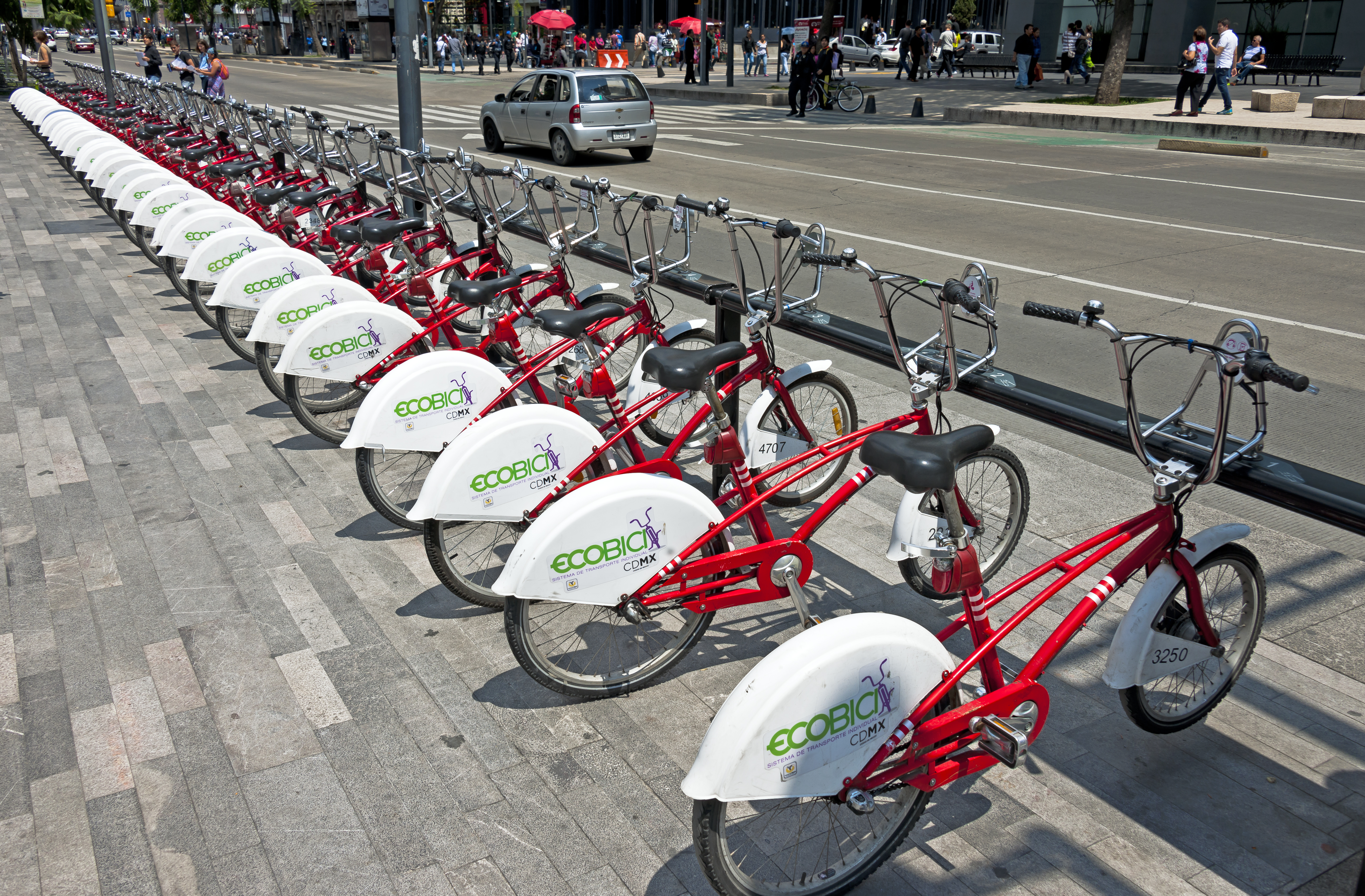
Ecobici bicycles in Mexico City.

==== Mexico City ====
Ecobici is one of the world's largest bicycle-sharing programs, with 452 stations covering a 35-square-kilometre (14 sq mi) area.

In February 2010, the government of Mexico City inaugurated a bicycle-sharing network called Ecobici. With distinctive red and white liveried bicycles, the network as of February 2015 consists of 444 stations with 6,500 bicycles. With more than 240,000 registered users, it has been argued that Ecobici is the largest bicycle-sharing program in North America. The system is run by the private company Clear Channel México, but funded by the government with an initial investment of 75 million pesos. Users of the system are required to purchase an RFID card at a cost of 400 pesos which provides them with access to the bicycles for one year. Use of a bicycle is free for the first 45 minutes; extra charges are applied for use beyond the time limit.

==== Guadalajara ====
In December 2014, the government of the State of Jalisco implemented a bicycle-sharing system called MiBici with 86 stations and 860 bicycles. As of August 2021, it has 300 stations with 3,200 bicycles. This system uses the technology and the hardware of PBSC.

==== Toluca ====
In November 2015, the Municipality of Toluca inaugurated a bicycle-sharing system called Huitoluzi with 26 stations and 300 bicycles, using PBSC as a provider. It is currently inactive.

==== Pachuca ====
In February 2016, the Municipality of Pachuca inaugurated a bicycle-sharing system called Bici Capital with six stations and 140 bicycles.

==== Puebla ====
Beginning in January 2017, Puebla was scheduled to have a system called Bici Puebla with 139 stations and 2,100 bicycles. Bici Puebla was no longer in operation as of 2025.

=== United States ===
In the United States, public bicycle share programs have largely centered around major cities and universities. Some corporate campuses have private systems. According to a report by the National Association of City Transportation Officials, a total of 35 million bike-share trips took place within the United States in 2017 across 100 bike-share systems across the country, operated by eight companies. Seattle led the way with a dockless bike sharing system in the U.S. in the summer of 2017, and other cities soon joined the ranks. Nine months later, about 44% of rides were dockless. The bikes became controversial in various cities; Dallas reportedly had 20,000 bikes on the streets, they were essentially banned in New York City and San Francisco, with Austin, Texas issuing emergency rules for their implementation.

==== Bikes Belong (Dem/Rep Conventions), 2008 ====
In 2007, Bikes Belong (now known as PeopleForBikes), an advocacy group financed by major bicycle manufacturers, worked with city officials, local advocates, and the healthcare firm Humana to bring bike sharing to the Republican and Democratic 2008 conventions. Called "Freewheelin!" the program offered 1,000 bicycles at 12 stations throughout the downtowns of the host cities, Denver and Minneapolis/St. Paul, over the five days of each convention. Bikes Belong's stated goal was to provide a proof-of-concept that large-scale bicycle sharing that had gained popularity in European cities could work in U.S. cities and provide a valuable addition to the transportation mix. The program was popular among conventioneers and helped the city of Denver to create a narrative around the "green" attributes of the convention. Both Denver and Minneapolis successfully pursued permanent bike sharing systems, with Denver B-cycle launching on 22 April 2010 as the first of its scale in the U.S., followed by Minneapolis' NiceRide system launching on 10 June 2010.

==== Aspen/Basalt, CO ====
The system was launched in 2013 with 16 stations and 200 bikes with provider PBSC.

==== Albany, NY ====
In 2017, CDPHP Cycle! launched in Albany and three other Capital region cities. The bikes can be locked to official docks or any other rack for a slightly higher fee. The system is operated by CDTA.

==== Alpharetta, GA ====
Alpharetta offered a bike share program operated by Zagster. Trips under three hours were free, and annual memberships were $20. Bikes could be rented from four stations throughout Alpharetta. Bikes could be taken anywhere, including Alpharetta's Big Creek Greenway– a 12-foot wide concrete path that stretches eight scenic miles terminating in Big Creek park. The service was suspended late May 2020 due to a large-scale Zagster shutdown, and all bicycles and stations were removed.

==== Atlanta, GA ====
In June 2016, Relay Bike Share launched as the bike share system for the City of Atlanta. The program, operated by Cyclehop and Social Bicycles, launched with 100 bicycles at 10 stations throughout the downtown area. The program aimed to offer 500 bicycles across the city by the end of 2016.

==== Austin, TX ====
In December 2013, Austin B-cycle was launched as the bike share system for the City of Austin with 11 stations. Austin B-cycle set a national bike share record for the most checkouts per bicycle in a single day, 10.1 checkouts per bike, on 14 March 2015 during the SXSW festival. In July 2020, Capital Metro and the city of Austin finalized a partnership to improve Austin's mobility network utilizing the city-owned BCycle bike share system. This partnership, now called Metrobike, aims to create long-term bike share service improvements such as expanding the BCycle fleet and stations, optimizing the system's first and last-mile transit solution, improving services and reaching communities outside of the downtown core, and fully electrifying BCycle's fleet. As of March 2022, the MetroBike system operated more than 75 bike share stations with 800 bikes in the central Austin area.

==== Baltimore, MD ====
In May 2014, over 40 bicycles were stolen from Baltimore Recreation and Parks department's bike-share program. The bikes were stolen during the city's Ride Around Reservoir program in Druid Hill Park. The bikes were set up to be lent out when a group of youths took them. The cost of replacing the stolen bikes is devastating to the program, which operates completely on donations.

==== Birmingham, AL ====
Birmingham launched Zyp Bikeshare in October 2015. Annual memberships are $75, with monthly passes for $20, 3-day passes for $12, and daily passes for $6. Zyp also offers discounted annual memberships to individuals who qualify. Zyp operates 400 bikes at 40 kiosks. Bikes can be ridden anywhere in the downtown Birmingham area. Once a bike is unlocked, riders have 45 minutes to ride before incurring additional fees if they have not docked at another station. As well as traditional bikes, Zyp was the first bike share in North America to have electric pedal-assist bikes to help riders cover distances or mount hills faster.

==== Boston, MA ====
In 2007, Boston Mayor Thomas M. Menino and Director of Bicycle Programs, Nicole Freedman, decided to bring bike sharing to the Boston area. The Metropolitan Area Planning Council, the regional planning agency for the metro-Boston region of 101 cities and towns, joined the effort. Brookline, Cambridge, and Somerville also participated.

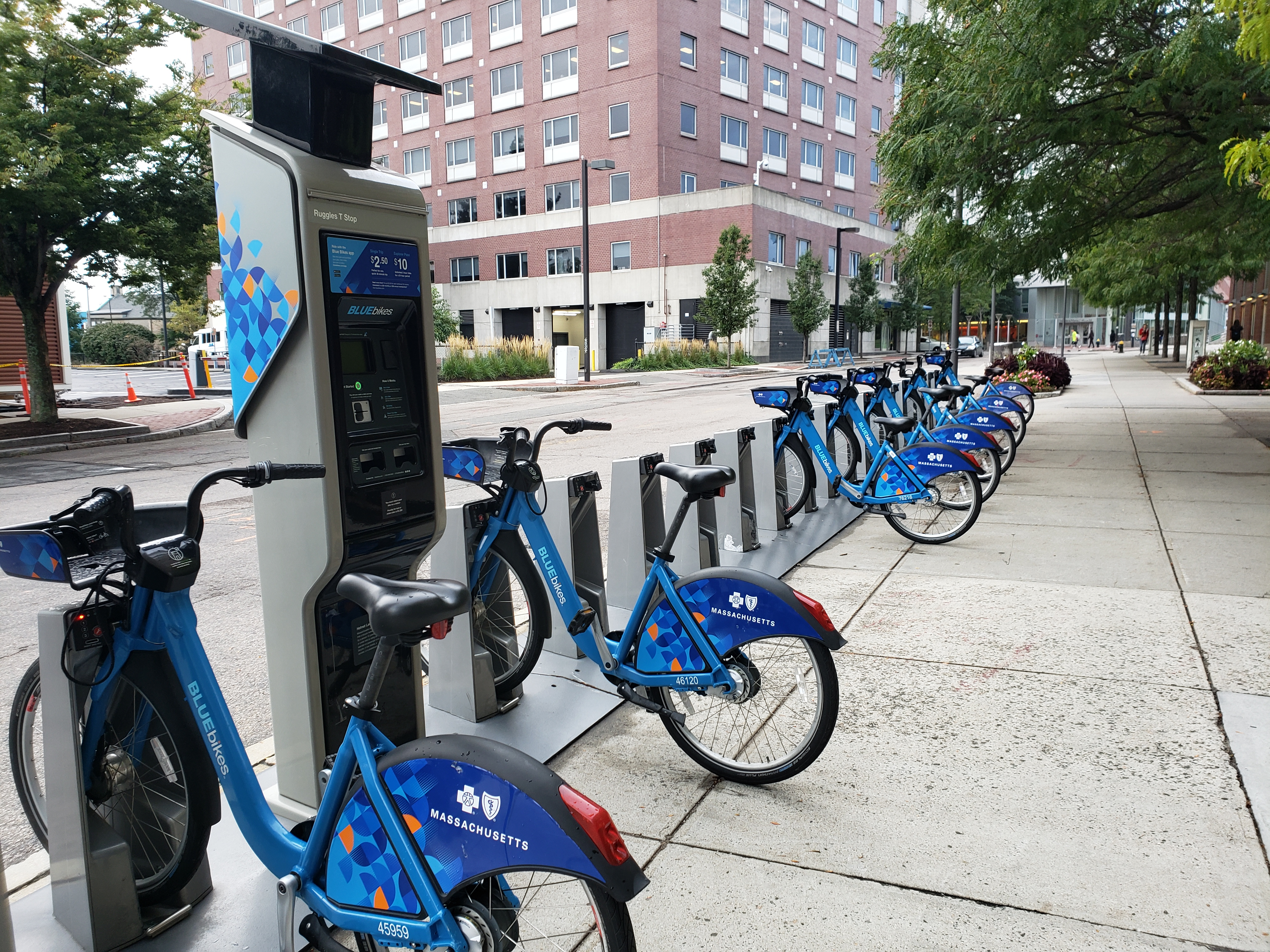
Boston Bluebikes station.

On 28 July 2011, Boston launched its 60-station, 600-bike Hubway system, sponsored by the shoe manufacturer New Balance and funded in part by a $3 million grant from the Federal Transit Administration. The contract to operate was awarded to Alta Bicycle Share and the equipment provider was PBSC Urban Solutions. Bicycle sharing was greeted with a mix of excitement and skepticism. In its first two and a half months, Hubway recorded 100,000 station-to-station rides. After recording 140,000 trips in four months, Boston's European-style bicycle-sharing system expanded outside city limits, planting stations across Cambridge, Somerville, and Brookline.

In the spring of 2018 Motivate the operator of the system changed sponsors from Hubway to the Blue Cross Blue Shield Association and officially changed the name of the bike share program to Bluebikes Boston. As of December 2018, the system had deployed 262 stations with a fleet of over 2,500 bikes.

==== Boulder, CO ====
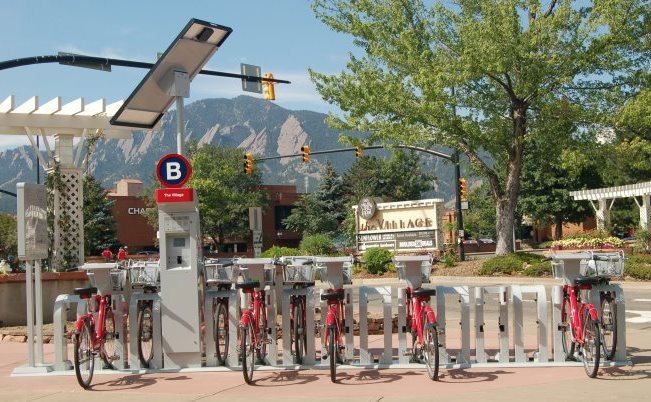
Solar powered Boulder B-cycle station with double sided docks. The system was launched in April 2010.

In May 2011, Boulder, Colorado launched a bicycle-sharing system, Boulder B-Cycle, with 100 bicycles and 15 stations. Like many in northern latitude cities, this system closes down during winter months to help preserve the life of the equipment.

==== Broward County, FL ====
Broward B-Cycle launched in December 2011 as the country's first county-wide bike share program, with 200 bikes and 20 stations located in several cities within Broward County, including Fort Lauderdale. This system was funded through a public-private partnership with the Florida Department of Transportation providing a $311,000 grant through Broward County, and B-Cycle's sponsors providing the remainder of the initial capital and operating costs.

==== Buffalo, NY ====
Reddy Bikeshare launched in 2016 with 200 bicycles at 35 stations around the city.

==== Charleston, SC ====
In August 2013, the College of Charleston's Office of Sustainability began a bike sharing program. This program's 16 bicycles are free to use for all full-time students, faculty, and staff members.

==== Charlotte, NC ====
A system of B-Cycle stands is installed downtown and in a few places nearby.

==== Chattanooga, TN ====
In July 2012, the Bike Chattanooga Bicycle Transit System launched in Chattanooga, Tennessee with 300 bikes and 28 solar-powered stations by PBSC. It was the first large scale bicycle transit system in the Southeast. The system has expanded to 33 stations and had recorded over 78,000 trips by its second anniversary.

==== Chicago, IL ====
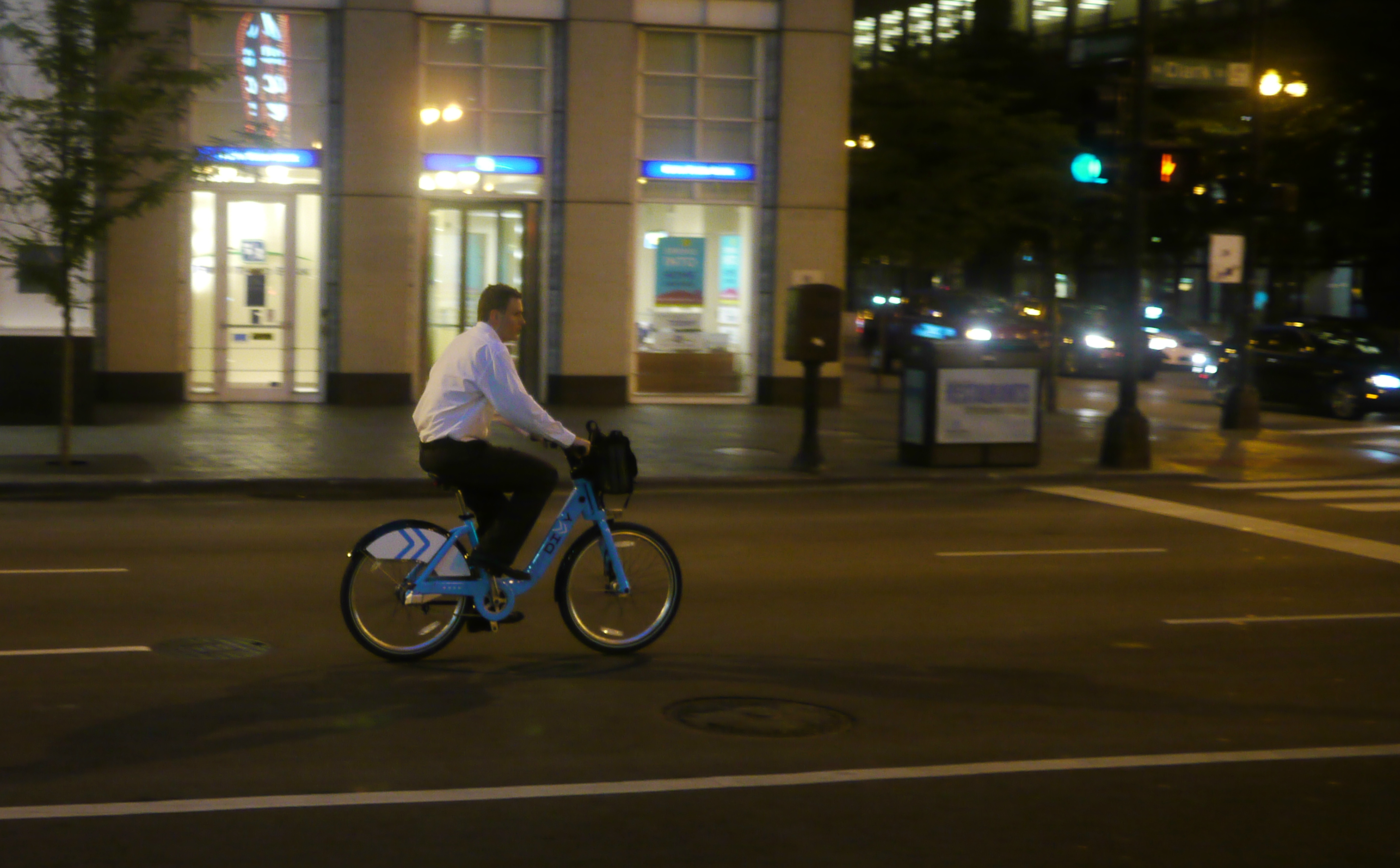
Launched in 2013, Divvy is the bike sharing program for Chicago and the largest in North America.

On 28 June 2013, Chicago launched Divvy, a bike share system with 750 bikes at 75 stations. As of September 2021, the system operates 16,500 bikes at over 800 stations, using both PBSC's hardware and software.

==== Cincinnati, OH ====
In September 2014, Cincinnati Red Bike started operation. It opened with 35 docking stations downtown, Over the Rhine, the University of Cincinnati's main campus, and surrounding areas. In 2023 Red Bike has expanded to 66 stations with over 600 bikes and has a ridership of 100,000+ per year.

==== Cleveland, OH ====
On 21 September 2016, Cleveland launched its UH Bike system, with 250 bicycles and 22 stations distributed around the city.

==== Columbia, SC ====
In September 2018, Columbia launched BlueBikeSC with BlueCross BlueShield SC being the chief sponsor. In March 2019, the regions transit authority, The Comet (transit) expanded the bike share system adding 10 stations to the system with a $250,000 grant from the federal transit authority.

==== Columbus, OH ====
On 30 July 2013, CoGo Bike Share started in Columbus, Ohio. It opened with 300 bikes and 30 docking stations in downtown and surrounding areas, all provided by PBSC and operated by Motivate.

In the summer of 2015, Zagster launched a 115-bicycle, 15-station system on the Ohio State University campus. The university decided not to integrate with the city's CoGo system. The Ohio State University announced plans to integrate electric assist bicycles as part of its bicycle share program launching in 2015. The Zagster program at Ohio State University shut down in August 2018.

==== Denver, CO ====
On 22 April 2010, Denver became the first U.S. city with a large-scale smart-technology-enabled bicycle-sharing system with the launch of Denver B-cycle. The system launched with 45 stations and 450 bicycles throughout downtown, downtown-adjacent neighborhoods, and on higher-education campuses. Denver B-cycle's roots came from the "Freewheelin" bike sharing program which operated for 6 days during the 2008 DNC convention in Denver. In Denver, several B-cycle rental stations are located at RTD Light Rail Platforms. The Denver B-cycle program varies in cost depending on use. Fees range from $8 per day to $80 per year.

Denver's B-cycle needed 7 1/2 months to reach 100,000 station-to-station rides.

==== Des Moines, IA ====
B-Cycle has partnered with the Des Moines Bicycle Collective, operating bike-sharing stations throughout the downtown core, East Village, Ingersoll, Sherman Hill, and Drake University neighborhoods. The system is in operation from 1 March - 30 November each year.

==== Detroit, MI ====
MoGo, a nonprofit affiliate of the Downtown Detroit Partnership, launched MoGo Bike Share in the Greater Downtown area with 430 bicycles across 43 stations on 23 May 2017.

==== Eugene, OR ====
PeaceHealth Rides is administered by JUMP Bikes (formerly Social Bicycles, and now owned by Uber) and is a partnership of the City of Eugene, Lane Transit District, and the University of Oregon. The system launched in downtown Eugene, the Whiteaker neighborhood, and the area around the University of Oregon with 300 bicycles across 36 stations in April 2018. PeaceHealth, a not-for-profit Catholic health system with 10 hospitals in three states including one hospital in Eugene, is the sponsor.

==== Fargo, ND ====
In March 2015, bicycle advocacy nonprofit Great Rides Fargo launched Great Rides Bike Share, a system with 101 bicycles at 11 stations. The system was launched in partnership with North Dakota State University, where students are enrolled at no additional cost. It was the first system to include integrated card access for enrolled students.

==== Fort Wayne, IN ====
In April 2016, The city of Fort Wayne announced a small system in its downtown area.

==== Fort Worth, TX ====
On 22 April 2013, Fort Worth Bike Sharing, a 501(c)3 non-profit organization, launched a B-cycle system consisting of 300 bikes and 30 stations serving Downtown, Near Southside, and Cultural District in Fort Worth, Texas. Fort Worth B-cycle is included in a program called "B-connected" which allows members of over 15 participating B-cycle cities to use their annual memberships for free in other cities.

==== Greenville, NC ====
The City of Greenville and nearby Farmville launched the bike share system LimeBike in early 2018. It serves citizens as well as students of East Carolina University.

==== Harrisburg, PA ====
The City of Harrisburg launched the Harrisburg Bike Share in late 2017 with 55 bikes through Zagster. 93% of the proceeds benefitted a state nonprofit to prevent school dropouts. In June 2020 the bike share program was shut down when Zagster ceased operations across the country.

It was replaced by SusqueCycle, which launched in Fall 2022.

==== Honolulu, HI ====
The City and County of Honolulu passed Bikeshare Resolution 14–35 on 14 March 2014. Bikeshare Hawaii, a local non-profit, operating as "Biki", started in June 2017 with about 100 stations and 1000 bicycles. During the first partial year, NACTO ranked Biki as the 8th most-ridden bike share service in the US. Biki reached 1 million rides after about 16 months of service. A 30% service expansion was undertaken in December 2018. The current service area extends from Iwilei to Waikiki / Diamond Head and mauka of H-I highway with about 1300 pedal bikes and over 130 stations. Biki had its first >100,000 ride month in October 2018 and had over 1 million rides during 2018. NACTO ranked Biki as the 6th most-ridden bike share service in the US for 2018. Biki chose PBSC's FIT model bicycle for its accessibility (lower weight and lower center of gravity), and as such has a much higher ratio of women riders (44%) than most US systems. Additionally, there is currently an independent small pilot program in Kailua (Hawai`i County) with three stations also utilizing PBSC equipment. This program received an additional small expansion grant in 2018.

==== Indianapolis, IN ====
On 22 April 2014, Indianapolis launched a public bike-share program called Indiana Pacers Bikeshare with 25 stations and 250 bikes. On 5 September 2019, the program expanded to include 21 more stations and 275 more bikes, bringing the program total to 525 bicycles and 50 stations.

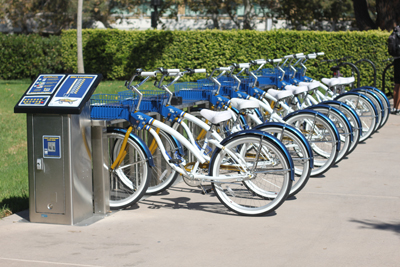
Zotwheels Bike Share at the University of California, Irvine.

==== Jersey City, NJ ====
On 21 September 2015, the Citi Bike system that started in New York City in 2013 expanded across the Hudson River to Jersey City, New Jersey with 35 stations and 350 bikes. Even though Citi Bike Jersey City is independent of Citi Bike New York, one membership works for both systems. The system experienced its first wave of expansion in July 2016 with 15 new stations and 150 additional bikes. The system currently boasts 50 stations with 500 bicycles throughout Jersey City.

==== Kansas City, MO ====
In 2012, Kansas City, Missouri launched Kansas City B-cycle in partnership with Blue Cross Blue Shield. The system currently has 30 stations and over 200 bicycles reaching downtown, Union Hill, Westport, Plaza and as of Summer 2015, Brookside Trolley Trail. North Kansas City will be adding 3 more stations in spring 2017 as well as several more coming to Midtown KCMO.

==== La Crosse, WI ====
On 20 April 2021, Drift Cycle was launched with 40 bikes at 8 stations in downtown La Crosse. In 2022, the system was expanded and improved with new bikes, a new app and two new stations at the University of Wisconsin-La Crosse and Gundersen Health System. With the relaunch on 21 April 2022, there are ten stations and 50 bikes.

==== Los Angeles, CA ====
On 7 July 2016, Los Angeles County launched Metro Bike Share, a 1,400-bike system with equipment by B-Cycle, operated by Bicycle Transit Systems. It was the first North American system to be both branded as part of the public transit agency and accessible using the regional TAP card, though at the time of launch users were required to maintain separate accounts for each transit mode and pay separate fares.

==== Lincoln, NE ====
On 20 April 2018, BikeLNK was launched and as of 2019, is made up of 105 bicycles and 20 stations. The program has recorded over 70,000 trips in 18 months of usage.

==== Madison, WI ====
In 1996, Madison, Wisconsin, instituted its Red Bikes Project, a public bike sharing program. These red-painted bicycles were available for the use of the general public, primarily in the student areas of State Street between the University of Wisconsin campus and the Wisconsin State Capitol. Initially, the only rule regarding the use of a Red Bikes Project bicycle was that it was required to remain outside and unlocked, and thus available for any passerby. After a surge in bicycle thefts and vandalism, the program was modified to require a valid credit card and $80 in security deposits for both the bicycle and the now-mandatory bicycle lock. The program is now only available seasonally, from spring (when all snow has melted) to 30 November.

==== Manhattan, KS ====
In 2015, the Green Apple Bikes bike-share system started in Manhattan, Kansas that makes single-speed cruisers available free for 4-hour periods. The program is funded by a consortium of businesses, and bicycles are maintained by volunteers.

==== Memphis, TN ====
On 23 May 2018, Explore Bike Share launched in Memphis, TN, and West Memphis, AR. The system was launched with 60 stations and 600 bicycles serving portions of West Memphis, Downtown Memphis, Uptown Memphis, Midtown Memphis, South Memphis, and Orange Mound, with a plan to add another 30 stations and 300 bicycles in 2019. The system uses B-Cycle equipment.

==== Miami and Miami Beach, FL ====
In March 2011, DecoBike launched in Miami Beach, Florida. The initial rollout of the program included "approximately 100 solar-powered stations and 1,000 custom-designed bikes available to residents and visitors." This public bicycle sharing and rental program is owned and operated by DecoBike, LLC, a Miami-based company, and operates under a long-term agreement with the City of Miami Beach. The service is available to both residents and visitors: any adult with a major credit card can check out a bike to pedal to their next location. An iPhone app and an interactive map on the DecoBike website allow one to locate the nearest "station" and displays the number of bikes available and the number of free docking spaces in real time.

==== Milwaukee, WI ====
In August 2014, the City of Milwaukee in partnership with a local non-profit organization, Midwest Bike Share, launched Bublr Bikes with 10 stations in downtown Milwaukee. The system grew to 17 stations by Fall 2015, and now there are 50 stations in the City of Milwaukee plus another 7 stations in the adjacent suburb of Wauwatosa (as of December 2016). Planning for additional stations within the City of Milwaukee is underway. Additionally, the adjacent communities of Shorewood and West Allis are expected to add around 7 stations each to the system in 2017. In May 2019 a project to add an additional 26 stations to the existing 87 was announced, with plans to have the additional stations online by summer 2020.

==== Minneapolis, MN ====
In June 2010, Minneapolis initiated Nice Ride, one of the first examples of a large-scale municipal bike sharing program in the United States. Phase 1 included 700 bikes and 65 stations throughout Minneapolis Due to popularity, the system was aggressively expanded into neighboring Saint Paul in 2011. As of 29 April 2012, Nice Ride had recorded a total of 330,000 trips, and a systemwide total of 1,330 bikes at 146 stations. The system is provided by PBSC. Minneapolis, Nice Ride needed six months to reach 100,000 station-to-station rides.

==== New Paltz, NY ====
The village of New Paltz, New York, home of SUNY New Paltz, has a bicycle lending program.

==== New York City, NY ====
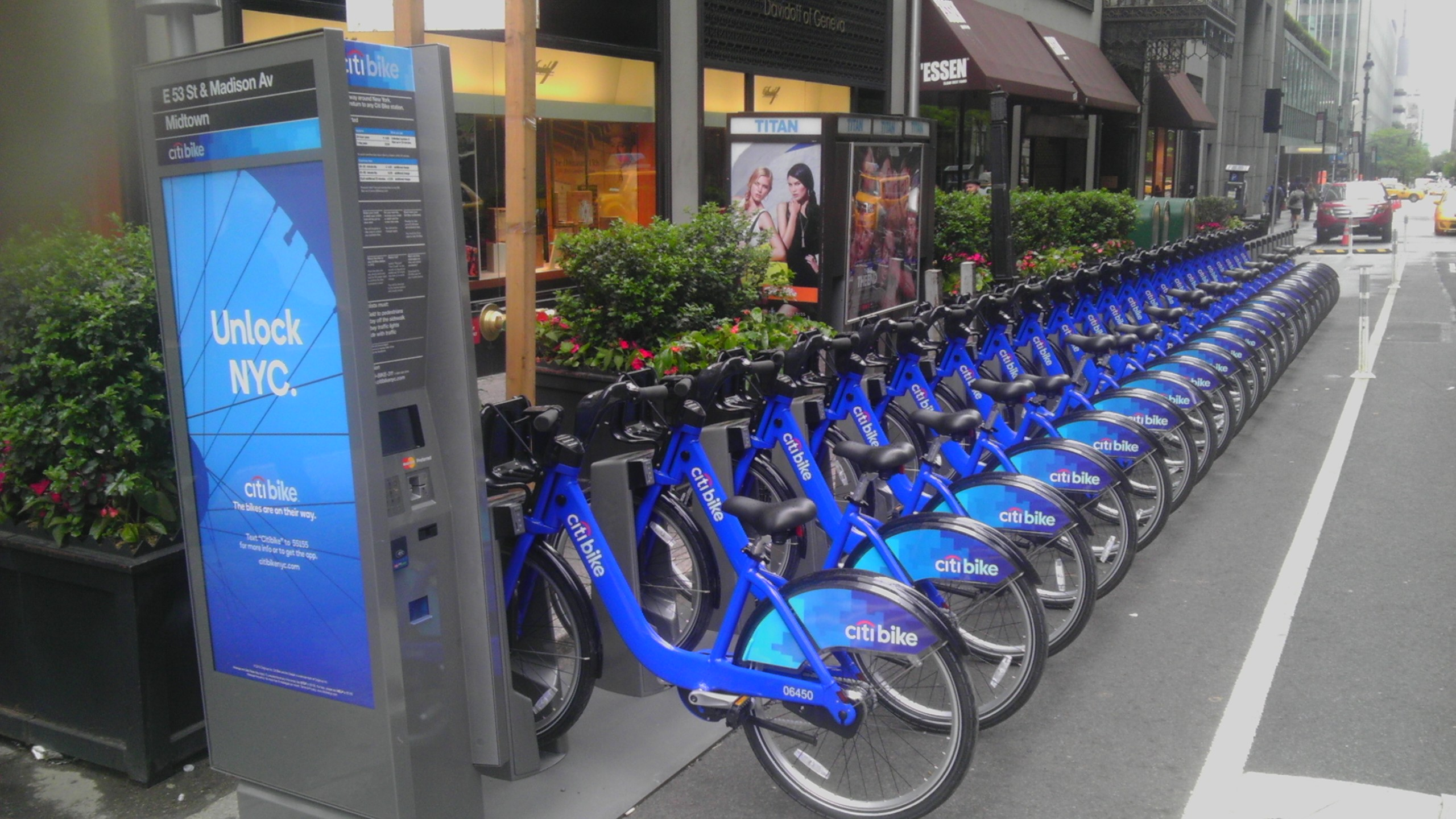
Citi Bike opened in New York City in May 2013.

On Memorial Day, 27 May 2013, New York City started its privately funded Citi Bike program. It was the nation's largest when it began operation, but Washington, D.C.'s system has grown faster. It began with 6,000 bikes at 330 docking stations in Manhattan and parts of Brooklyn. According to the city vision OneNYC the city wants to expand it to 12,000 bikes and 750 docking stations in Manhattan, all of Brooklyn and Queens. By 29 May, on its third day of operation, the program had 21,300 individuals signed on as annual members. As of June 2013 Citi Bike is the largest bike sharing program in the United States. In August 2015, Citi Bike once again became the largest system in the United States with 400 stations. Jump Bikes, a dockless electric bicycle-sharing system launched in the city in September 2017.

==== Oklahoma City, OK ====
On 18 May 2012, the City of Oklahoma City launched its bike share program known as Spokies. On 1 August 2014, Spokies became part of EMBARK, Oklahoma City's transit agency. The system has eight docking stations and 145 bikes throughout downtown Oklahoma City.

==== Philadelphia, PA ====
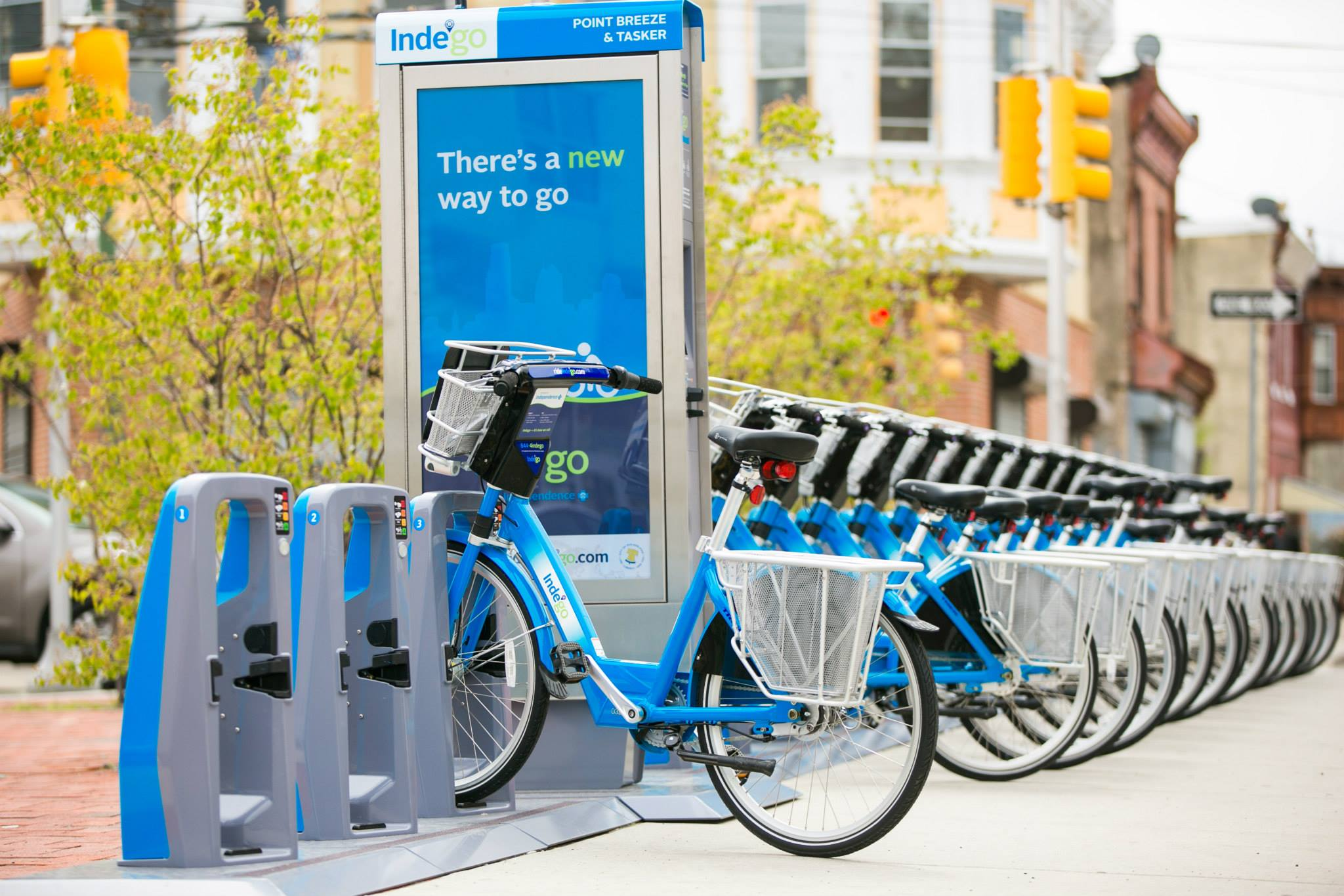
The Indego system in Philadelphia.

On 23 April 2015, the City of Philadelphia launched its privately funded Indego bike share program with 60 docking stations and 600 bikes, located in Center City, South Philadelphia, Northern Liberties, and University City. It uses equipment by B-Cycle and is operated by Bicycle Transit Systems with a naming sponsorship from locally based health insurer Independence.

==== Phoenix, AZ ====
On 25 November 2014, Phoenix launched Grid Bike Share with 100 bikes at 27 stations. It has since expanded to nearly 500 bikes at 48 stations and has plans to add another 200 bikes and 20 stations. Mesa, AZ, joined the system in March 2016, with 100 bikes at 14 stations, with plans to add another 200 bikes and 10–14 stations. Tempe, AZ, intends to join the three-city system in early 2017 with 300 bikes at 31 stations. In early December 2020, GRID announced the closure of the Bike Share program on 31 December 2020

==== Pittsburgh, PA ====
On 31 May 2015 Pittsburgh, during an Open Streets day, launched its Healthy Ride bike share program with nextbike hardware. The system launched with 50 docking stations and 500 bikes located in Downtown Pittsburgh, South Side Flats, North Shore, Strip District, Lawrenceville, Oakland, Bloomfield, and Shadyside. By 2022, there were 106 stations.

Healthy Ride was retired in 2022, and replaced with POGOH, using stations and bikes from PBSC. It launched with 38 stations and 350 bikes, split between mechanical and e-bikes. In 2023, they expanded to 60 stations and 600 bikes.

==== Portland, ME ====
First introduced in 2022 and operated by Tandem Mobility, Portland, Maine's bike share system has a combined 200 conventional and e-bikes at 40+ stations.

==== Portland, OR ====
One of the first community bicycle projects in the United States was started in Portland, Oregon in 1994 by civic and environmental activists Tom O'Keefe, Joe Keating, and Steve Gunther. It took the approach of simply releasing a number of bicycles to the streets for unrestricted use. While Portland's Yellow Bike Project was successful in terms of publicity, it proved unsustainable due to theft and vandalism of the bicycles. The Yellow Bike Project was eventually terminated, and replaced with the Create A Commuter (CAC) program, which provides free secondhand bicycles to certain preselected low-income and disadvantaged people who need a bicycle to get to work or attend job training courses.

On 19 July 2016 Portland launched Biketown, a system with 1,000 GPS-enabled smart bikes sold by Social Bicycles and operated by Motivate with a $10 million, five-year naming sponsorship by Nike. It was the continent's largest smart-bike system at the time of launch. The 100 stations covered 8.1 square miles but were concentrated most densely in downtown Portland and the Pearl and Northwest Districts. Funding came entirely from a $2 million allocation of federal dollars approved by the Metro regional government, from Nike, and from ongoing user fees and smaller sponsorships.

==== Salem, MA ====
In 2011, the city of Salem, Massachusetts launched a bike share program called Salem Spins, offering the use of bicycles free of charge, for use around the city. The seasonal program was financed in part with a $25,000 grant for a fleet of 20 bicycles. The program was offered from April to October until June 2020, when the city's private bike share partner Zagster shut down.

==== Salt Lake City, UT ====
On 8 April 2013, Salt Lake City launched GREENbike as the region's Bike Share brand. The program launched in downtown Salt Lake City with 10 stations and added two new stations less than four months later. The program will be expanding to 20 stations by 2014 with the goal of 100 stations in downtown Salt Lake City. Satellite GREENbike systems in cities such as Ogden are in the works and will be connected by the state transit authority's Frontrunner light rail train.

==== San Diego, CA ====
Though the City of San Diego signed a 10-year contract with Discover (formerly DECO) Bike in 2013, a docked bike-share, in January 2018 the city attorney Mara Elliot opined that the city's contract did not preclude other companies from operating within city limits, as long as there were "no city support or participation, other than legally required reviews and approvals." Ofo and LimeBike began operating on 15 February 2018. As of March 2018, Ofo, LimeBike, and Mobike offered dockless bike rentals within the city. LimeBike and Bird offer electric scooters, and LimeBike offered electric pedal-assist bikes as well. However, there have been some concerns in high-pedestrian corridors.

Due to a breach of contract (according to the city of San Diego), the City of San Diego withdrew the operations permit for the Discover Bike in March 2019 and thus ended docked bike share service in the city.

==== San Francisco / Bay Area, CA ====
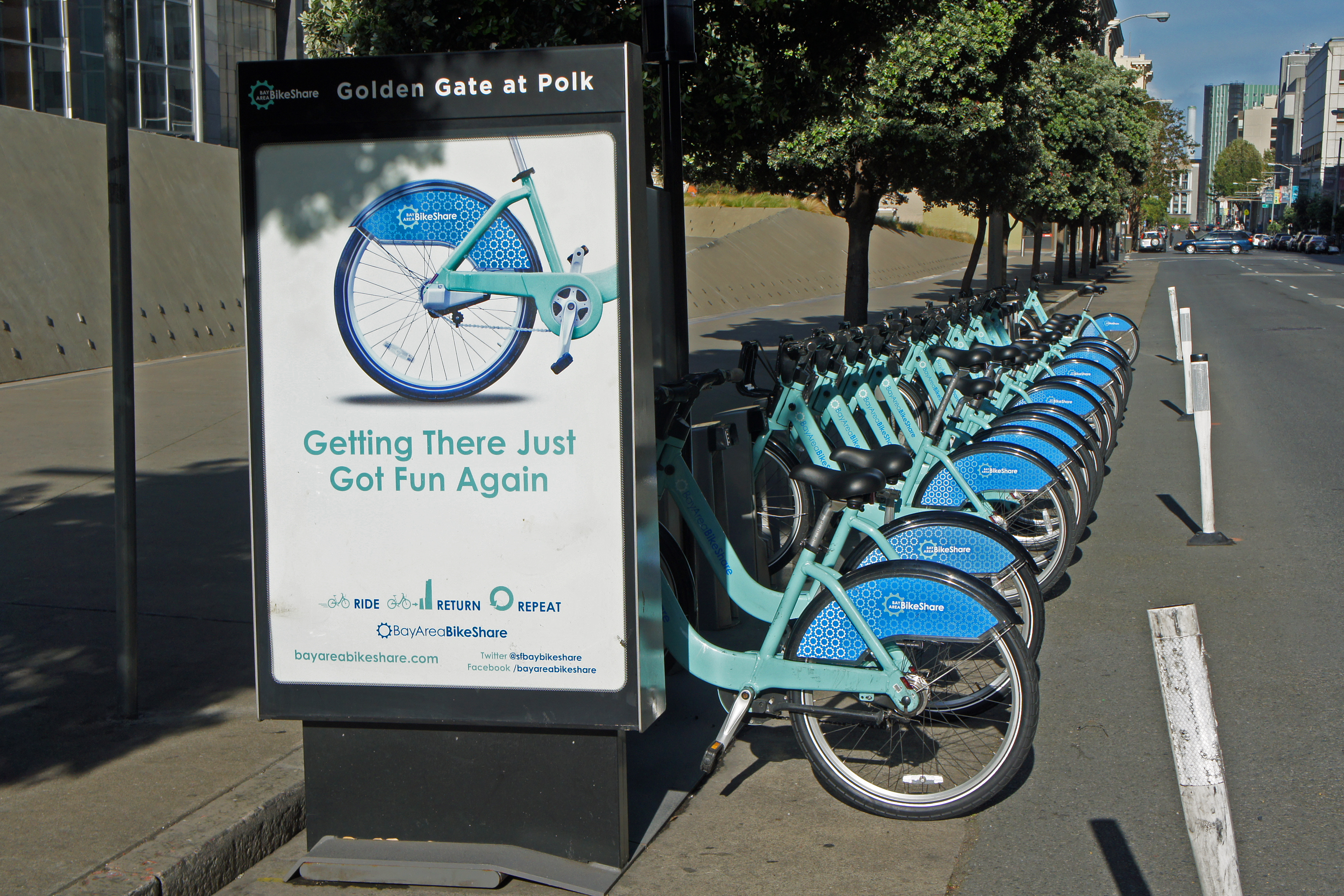
The Bay Area Bike Share system began operating in the San Francisco Bay Area in August 2013.

In August 2013 the Bay Area Bike Share system began operating in the San Francisco Bay Area of California. The system allocated half of its 700 bicycle fleet in San Francisco, and the rest along the Caltrain corridor in Redwood City, Palo Alto, Mountain View and San Jose. In 2015, it was announced that the scheme would expand to 7,000 bikes, over 2016–2017, and would include the East Bay Area communities of Berkeley, Emeryville, and Oakland.

==== Seattle, WA ====
On 13 October 2014, Pronto Cycle Share launched with 500 bicycles and 50 stations. Pronto uses Motivate of New York City as the operator. In January 2017, Seattle's mayor announced the system would be permanently shut down at the end of March 2017 due to funding shortfalls. Dockless systems by LimeBike and Spin were introduced in July 2017 as their first large-city systems in the US.

==== Stony Brook, NY ====
In April 2013, Stony Brook University launched the Wolf Ride Bike Share system with four stations and 48 bicycles. As of November 2015, the system consisted of 12 stations and 78 bicycles.

==== Topeka, KS ====
On 15 April 2015, Topeka Metro Bikes launched with 100 smart bikes and 10 stations. An additional 100 bikes were added to the system in April 2016. The program shut down in July 2020, and all 300 bikes were subsequently sold at auction. A local non-profit purchased the bikes, modified them to remove the electronics, and gave them to members of the community on a first-come, first-served basis.

==== Tucson, AZ ====
In 1996, a pilot bicycle share project known as the Orange Bike Project was organised in Tucson, Arizona by Bootstraps to Share, a homeless advocacy organisation inspired by the Bikes Not Bombs movement. Using funds from a government grant to obtain, recondition, and maintain 30 bicycles, project organisers announced plans to station the bicycles in downtown Tucson and areas adjacent to the University of Arizona. The publicly shared bicycles, painted bright orange by Earl Scheib to identify them, were primarily intended for use by the homeless or those without means of affordable transportation. The initial 30 bicycles placed into service for the Orange Bike Project were all stolen within a few weeks. A total of 80 bicycles were eventually used in the Orange Bike Project, all of which were either stolen or vandalised beyond repair. In one case, an Orange Bike Project bicycle was thrown in front of a freight train, in others, bikes were found with major frame damage consistent with deliberate vandalism. The program was terminated after only five months of operation.

==== Tulsa, OK ====
The Tulsa Townies bicycle project was launched in August 2007 by Saint Francis Health System. This project is the first bicycle program of its kind in northeastern Oklahoma. As of 2016, the bicycle rental stations were located at the Tulsa River Parks trail along Riverside Drive at 19th and 41st streets and in Jenks at the 96th street Arkansas River pedestrian bridge.

==== Washington, D.C., northern Virginia and suburban Maryland ====
In Washington, D.C., the privately operated bike-sharing project SmartBike DC opened for service in 2008 in the District of Columbia with 10 stations and 120 bikes. Operated by the advertising firm Clear Channel Outdoor, the system was funded by advertising revenues from bus shelters on public streets, along with revenues from user membership and usage fees. The program suffered from perennially low membership and rider usage rates, as well as a limited number of bike rental stations. It was officially terminated in January 2011.

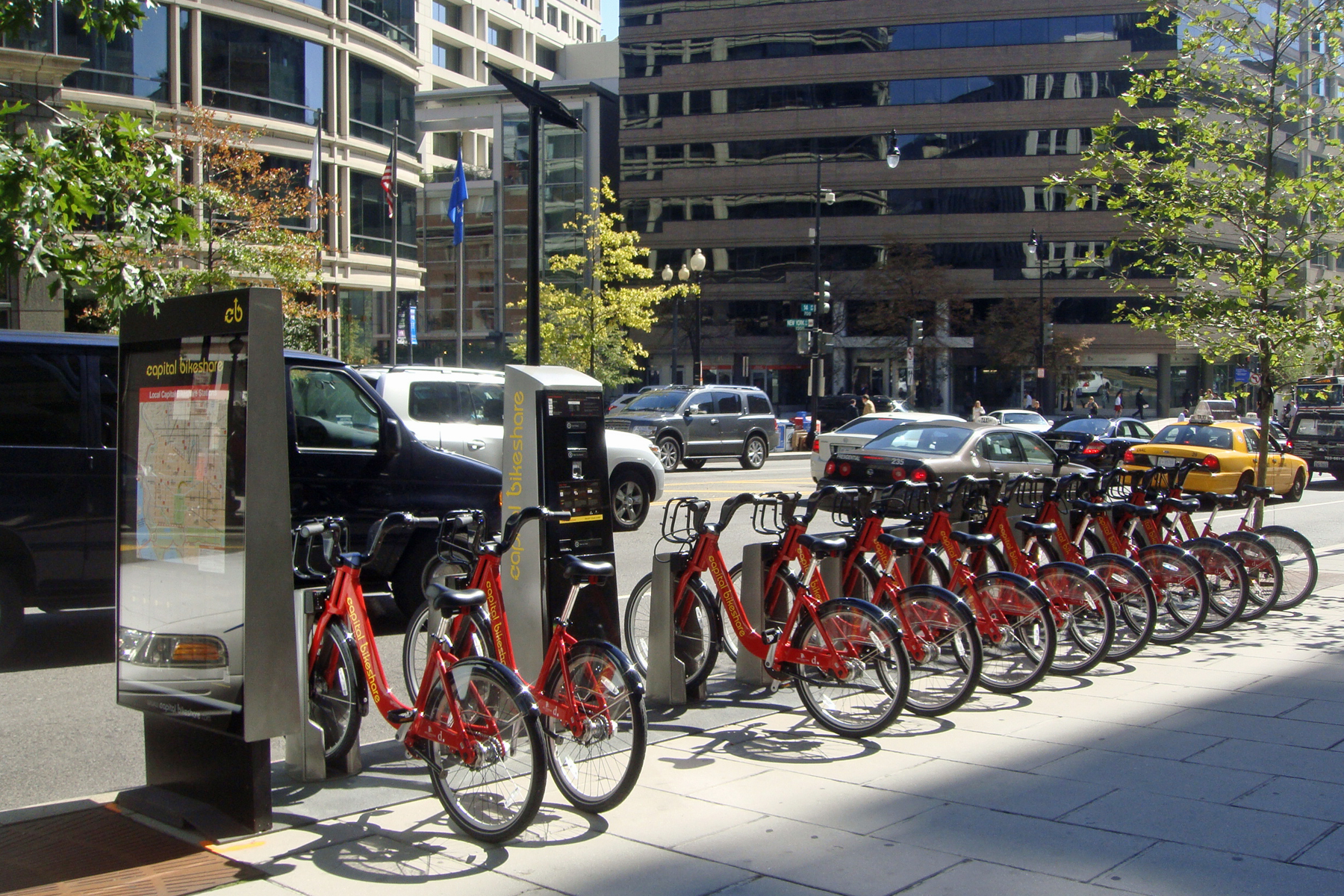
Capital Bikeshare was launched in Washington, D.C. and Arlington County, Virginia in 2010.

On 20 September 2010, Arlington County, Virginia and the District of Columbia launched the U.S.'s first public-private partnership bike share system, Capital Bikeshare (CaBi), which replaced SmartBike DC. Unlike SmartBike, CaBi is a public taxpayer-supported (local government and federal funds) bicycle-sharing program. The initial scheme involved some 1,100 bicycles at 100 stations located throughout the District of Columbia and parts of Arlington County, Virginia. The cost of planning, implementation, and administration for Capital Bikeshare totaled US$5.0 million, with first-year operating costs of US$2.3 million for 100 stations. CaBi was operated by Alta Bicycle Share (now Motivate International) with equipment from Montreal-based PBSC Urban Solutions. Capital Bike Share was the largest bike sharing system in the United States until May 2013.

As of 2017, Washington, D.C. had four dockless bike-share systems.

==== Wauwatosa, WI ====
In June 2017, the city of Wauwatosa, Wisconsin partnered with Zagster to incorporate an adaptive bike-share station into their existing Bublr network. It was thought to be the first adaptive bike-share station in Wisconsin, and the dual partnership is thought to be the first of its kind in the United States.

==== California ====
In California, many cities have launched or have stated plans to launch their own bike-sharing programs, including the cities of Anaheim (as of 2012, 10 bikes and 1 station, with plans for 100 bikes and 10 stations), Los Angeles (as of 2012, plans for 4000 bikes at 400 stations), Santa Monica (as of 2012, plans for 250 bikes at 25 locations), and San Diego. The San Francisco Bay Area's Bay Area Air Quality Management District, in partnership with Alta Bike Share, city governments, and transportation authorities, announced plans for a pilot regional sharing program in 2013 for the San Francisco Peninsula and San Jose.

In the fall of 2009, the University of California, Irvine introduced its Zotwheels automated bike share program. Students and university employees may sign up for a Zotwheels membership card at an annual cost of $40, which enables the user to check out a bike from any bike station located throughout campus for a maximum of three hours and drop it off at any other station. A $200 charge is imposed for a lost, stolen, or severely damaged bike. Bicycle availability and station operational status may be determined using an interactive map. Revenues from membership fees are sufficient to offset only a small fraction of the total operating costs of the program; all remaining manufacture, installation, maintenance, and implementation costs of the Zotwheels systems and the bicycles themselves are borne by UCI. Zotwheels was developed as a collaboration between the UCI Parking and Transportation Services, The Collegiate Bicycle Company, CSL Ltd, and Miles Data Technologies.

In January 2018, e-bike provider Jump Bikes launched in San Francisco, becoming the first dockless bicycle-sharing system to launch in the city.

ofo offers a partnership program with universities to provide sustainable campus transportation. On 21 February 2018, ofo and Pomona College in Claremont, California launched the first college pilot program in California.

== South America ==
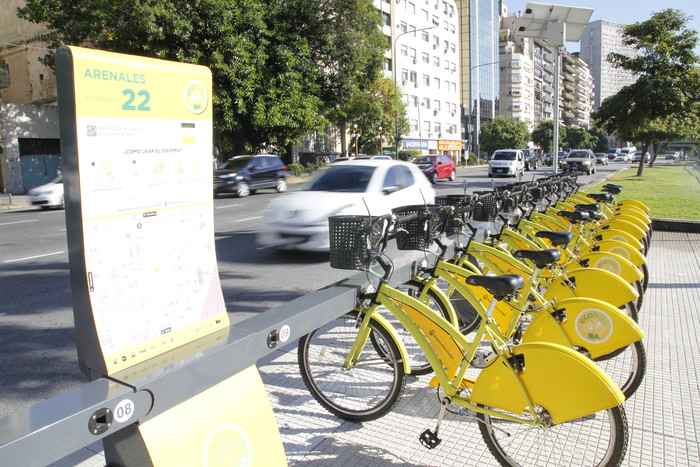
EcoBici station in Buenos Aires.

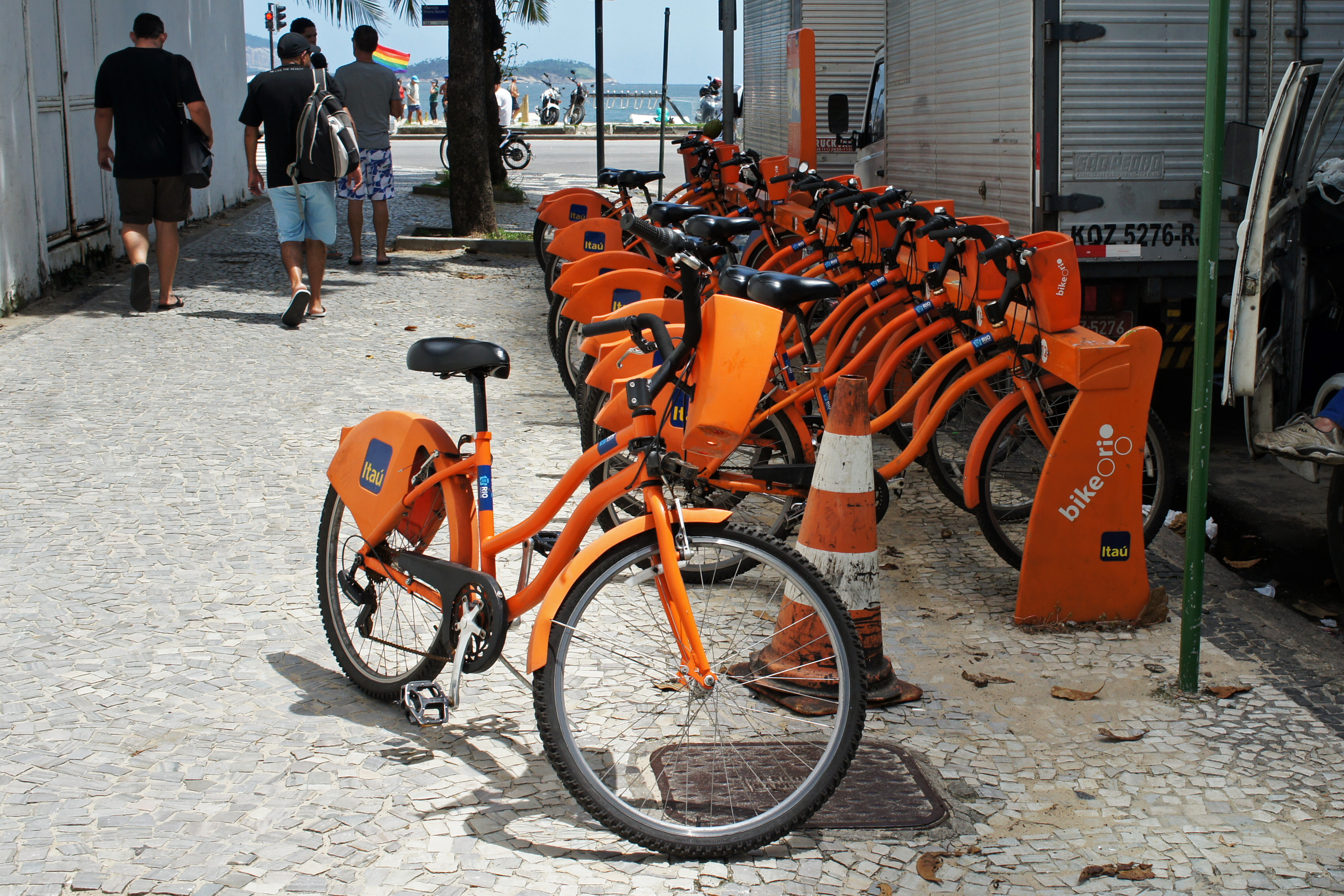
Bike Rio rental station located near Posto 9, Ipanema, in Rio de Janeiro city, Brazil.

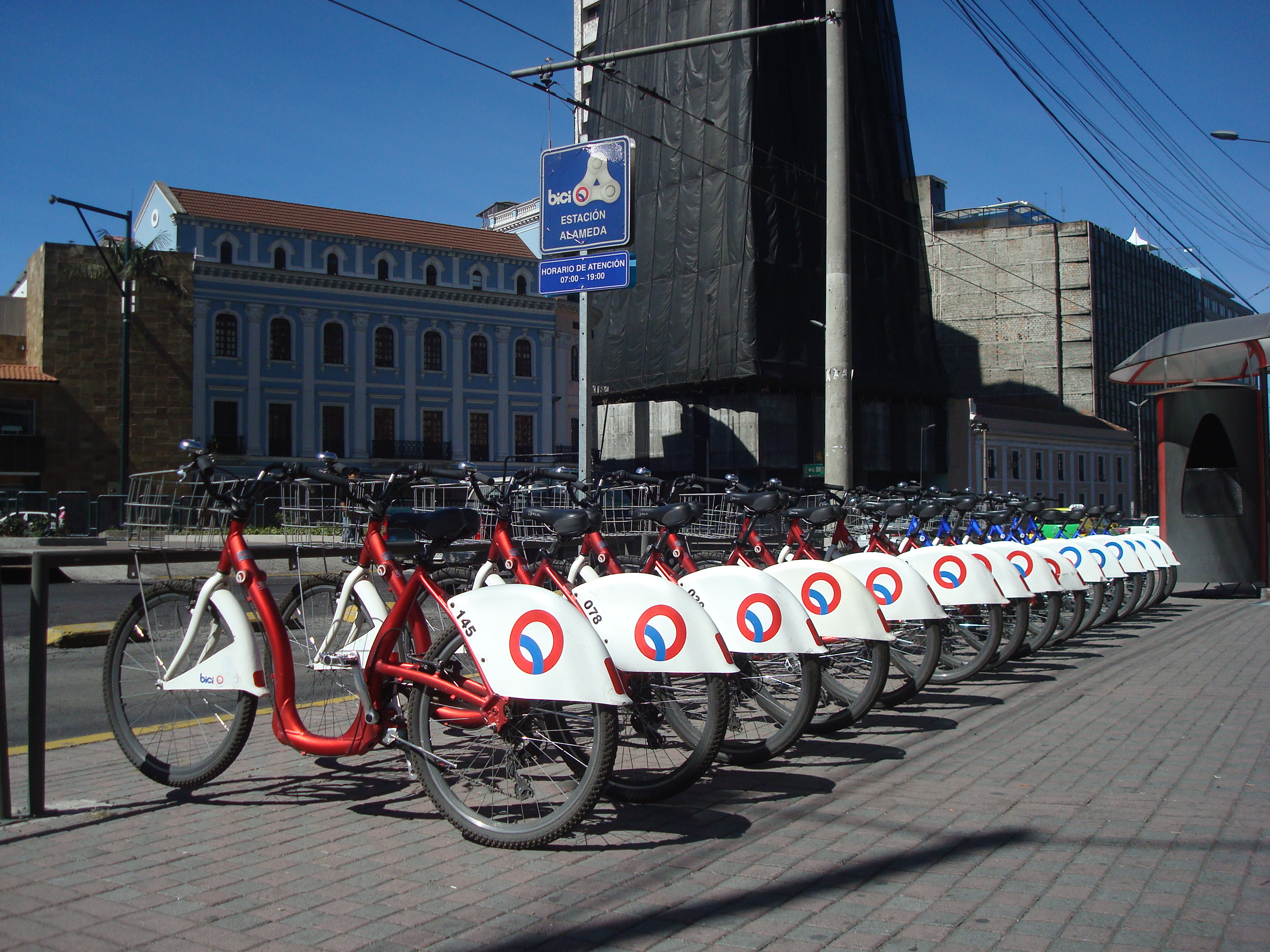
Bici Q station in Quito, Ecuador.

=== Argentina ===
==== Rosario ====
On 2 December 2015 Rosario launched Mi bici tu bici, which had 200 bicycles available at 18 rental stations downtown.

==== San Lorenzo ====
In November 2016, San Lorenzo launched Biciudad, a free-to-use bike sharing system. The system was launched by the San Lorenzo Government to reduce the use of motor vehicles and enhance means of non-motorized transport.

The Biciudad Bike Sharing System is expanding along with the construction of a circuit of exclusive lanes for bicycles across the city.

=== Brazil ===
Bike Itaú is a public bicycle-sharing system in the city of Rio de Janeiro, Brazil. It is run by PBSC Urban Solutions and started on 20 February 2018, and is sponsored by the municipal government of Rio de Janeiro in partnership with Banco Itaú. The system replaces the old one operated by Serttel, a private concessionaire, that began operations in October 2011.

A similar scheme was implemented in the city of São Paulo on 24 May 2012, called Bike Sampa. It is free up to the first hour of use, after which users are charged R$5 every 30 minutes. There are about 140,000 registered users and, as of 6 May 2013, there had been 220,000 bicycle trips in the city.

Other cities with similar bike sharing systems are operated by Serttel: Brasília, Belo Horizonte, Salvador, Porto Alegre, Santos, Recife, Belém, Manaus, Fortaleza, Vitória and Aracaju. Fortaleza's bike sharing system, named Bicicletar, has the highest relative use in Brazil. With 800 bikes and 80 stations, the system registers 6.4 trips per bike on workdays as of 2015.

=== Chile ===
There are three separate bike-share systems in the metropolitan area of Santiago, the capital city of Chile: Bikesantiago, Bici Las Condes, and Mobike.

The commune of Providencia, part of the Santiago de Chile metropolitan area, implemented a public bike-share system named B'easy and started services in August 2008 with a monthly membership of 1000 Chilean Pesos (US$2) and four stations.

==== Santiago Metropolitan Area ====
Bikesantiago started its services in October 2013 in the metropolitan commune of Vitacura with 30 stations, 300 bicycles, and a monthly membership of 4990 Chilean pesos (US$8). By November 2015, it had 25000 subscribers, 132 stations, and 1882 bicycles in the communes of Lo Barnechea, Vitacura, Providencia (Replacing the original B'easy system), Santiago, Ñuñoa, Recoleta and Independencia and had contracts for a programmed expansion in a total of 14 communes, 200 stations and 2100 bikes in the Metropolitan Area of Santiago.

==== Las Condes ====
Bici Las Condes is the communal bike-share system of Las Condes, part of the Metropolitan Area of Santiago. It began service in March 2015 with a total of 50 stations and 500 bikes and had a planned expansion to a total of 100 stations and 1000 bikes. The decision of the Las Condes municipal council to not join the Metropolitan area tender for an interconnected bike-sharing system was controversial.

=== Colombia ===
The EnCicla Bike Share System in Medellín is operated by the metropolitan area of Aburrá Valley. EnCicla is integrated with the city's existing infrastructure of cycle routes, mass transit, and public transport systems.

=== Ecuador ===
In August 2012 the Municipality of Quito government established a municipal bicycle-sharing system called Bici Q. The Municipality of Cuenca implemented a public bicycle-sharing system in 2013. Bici Q is free and available for anyone with a membership card, which can be obtained online or in person.

=== Uruguay ===
The Movete Bike Share System in Montevideo is integrated with the city's existing infrastructure of cycle routes, mass transit and public transport systems.

== Asia ==
=== Bangladesh ===
JoBike is a bicycle-sharing system serving the cities of Dhaka, Chittagong and Cox's Bazar. Launched in 2018, it is the first such system in Bangladesh.

=== China ===
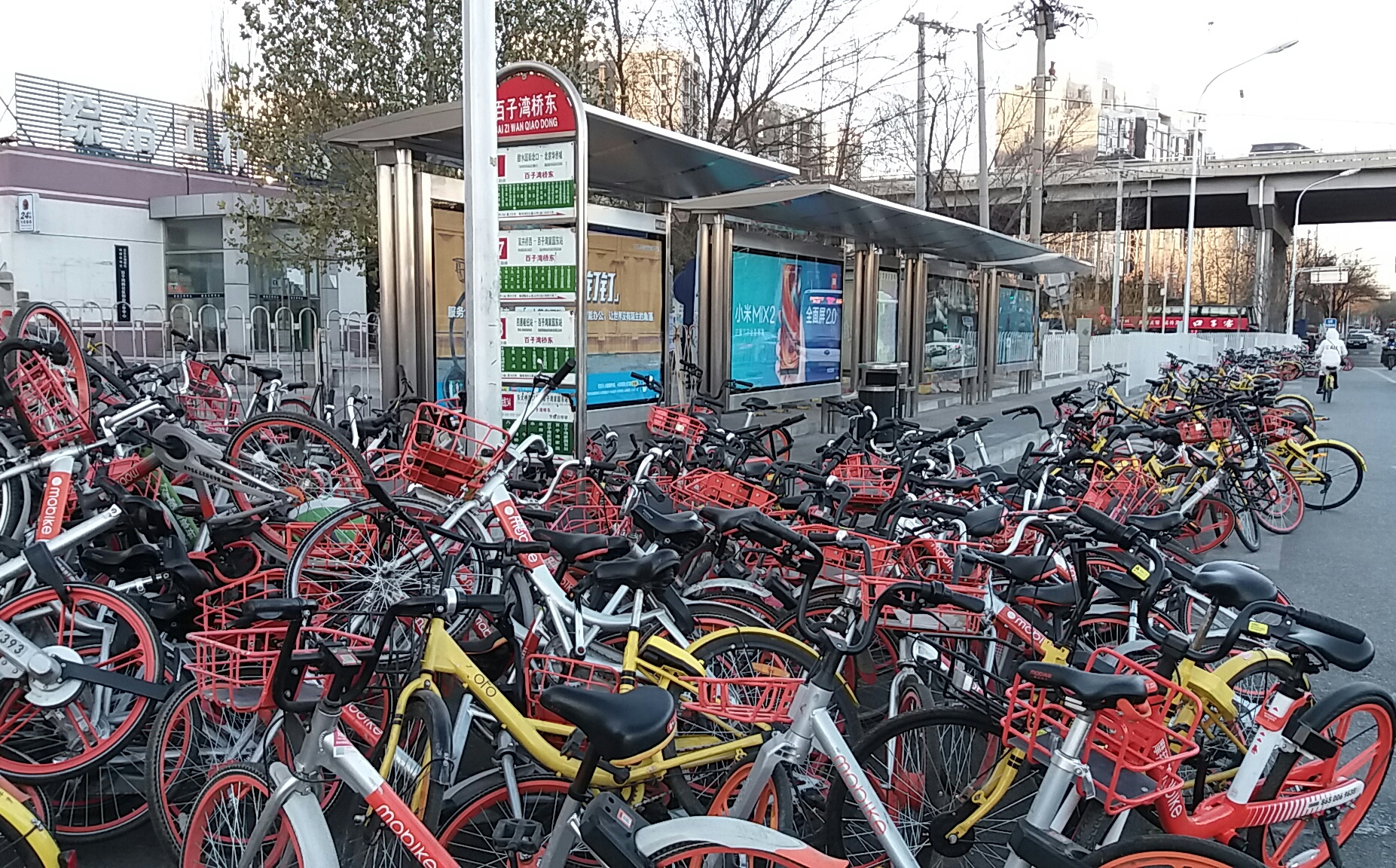
Mobikes in Beijing.

Initially, a number of traditional (third-generation) docked public bike systems operated by local municipal governments opened across China, with the largest ones being in Wuhan and Hangzhou. The first was introduced in Beijing in 2007. However, third-generation bike sharing has not been considered successful in the majority of cities in China. Bike sharing in Beijing virtually stopped and also encountered difficulties in Shanghai and Wuhan.

In 2014, students from Peking University created a company called ofo and initialize the fourth generation bike sharing system in their campus. In 2017, a number of private competing app-based dockless bike-sharing programs have started to appear in numerous cities across China. The two largest dockless operators are Mobike and Ofo, others include Bluegogo and Xiaoming. Many Chinese cities saw massive growth in the number and use these dockless bike share programs, clogging sidewalks around major commercial hubs and subway stations with parked bikes. Given the speed of growth with these services, local governments did not have any regulations or planning to accommodate these systems. However the Chinese government encourages the development of dockless bikes to reduce urban pollution. Early studies in Beijing and Shanghai have linked the massive increase of dockless bike shares to the decrease in the number of private automobile trips that are less than five kilometres. In Guangzhou, the arrival of dockless bike shares had a positive impact in the growth of cycling mode share.

==== Beijing ====
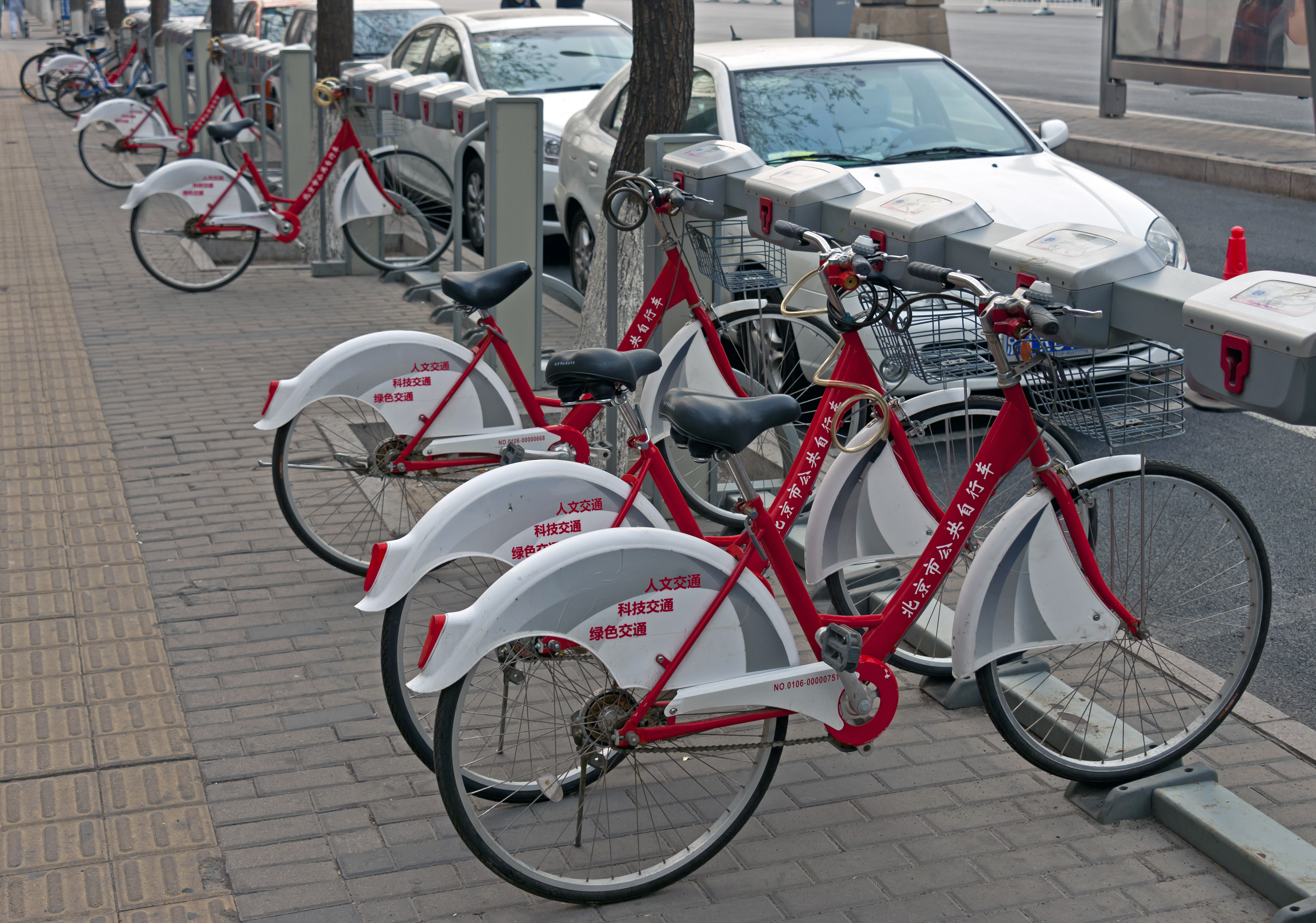
Shared bike rack in Beijing.

A municipal scheme in Beijing was launched in 2012 with the stationing of 2,000 bikes in the Chaoyang district. The scheme was scheduled to consist of 20,000 rental bikes and 500 kiosks, according to the Beijing Municipal Commission of Development and Reform. The main operating area was to be in business districts and near subway stations and major public venues. By 2015, authorities intended to have 50,000 bikes available, similar to the Hangzhou scheme that was used as a model. This development followed the failure of a scheme launched in 2005–2006 (ahead of Vélib') and in the light of a 2011 announcement by the Beijing Municipal Commission of Transport that it expected to raise the bike share of urban commuter journeys from 20 to 23 percent by 2015.

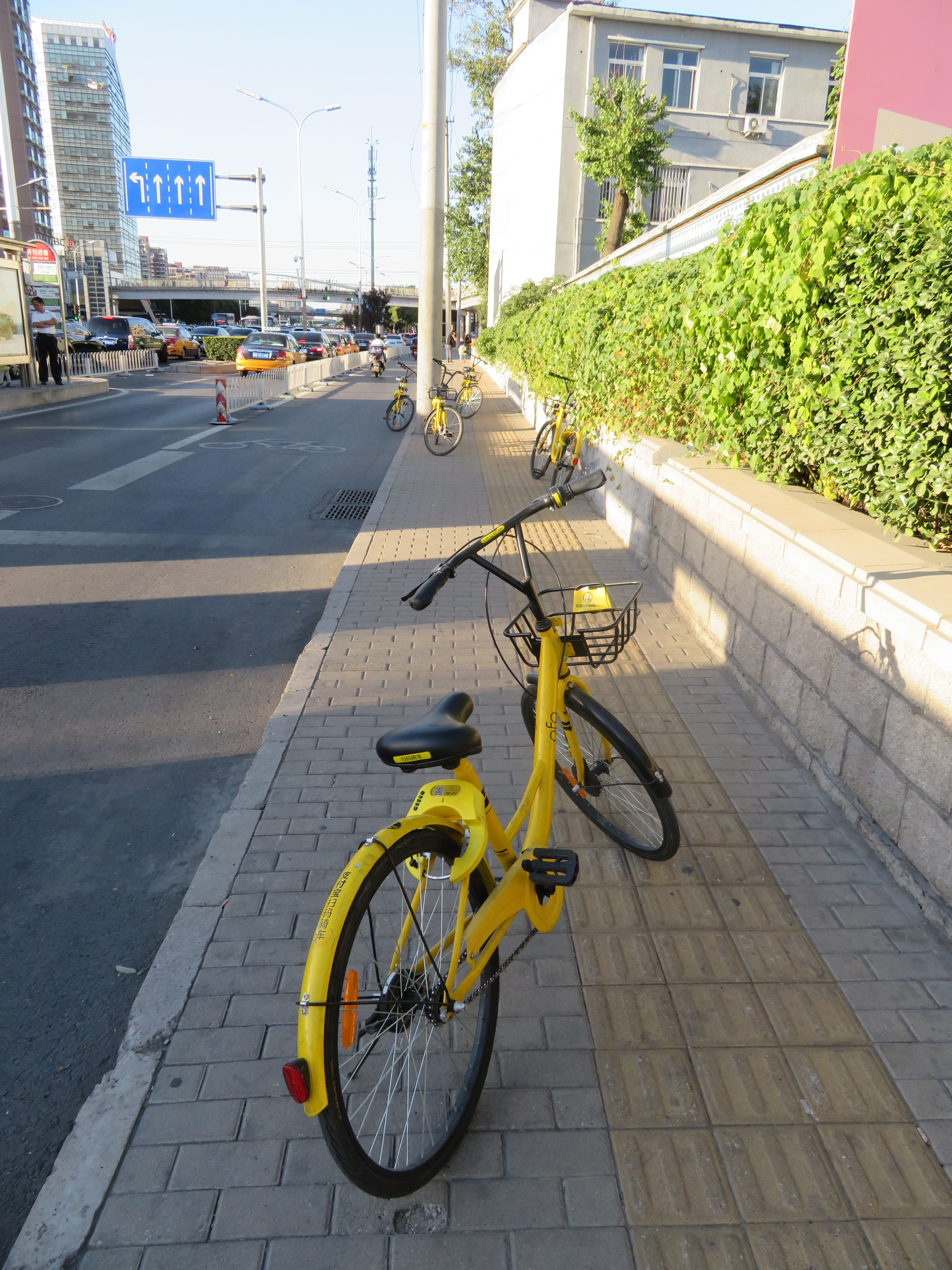
Ofo bikes randomly parked on the pavement (sidewalk) in Beijing.

In March 2017, Beijing saw over 200,000 dockless shared bikes from various companies enter service. The bikes are accessible via an app, and typically cost around 1 RMB per hour plus a refundable damage deposit of 299 RMB. Aside from the dockless bicycles, an existing municipal-run, dock-based bike network has 86,000 bikes. The Beijing municipal government pledged to improve management and parking availability in response to the rapidly growing fleets of dockless bikes. Beijing cycling rates increased from 5.5% to 11.6% after the arrival of the dockless bike systems.

==== Shanghai ====
In preparation for the 2010 World Expo in Shanghai, China, Shanghai launched a limited bike share programme accessible through RFID cards. Users could purchase 100-ride credits for about $30. Short rides are rewarded credits and longer rides subtract credits once the bikes have been re-docked. Shanghai planned to expand to 3,500 Bicycle Hot Spots throughout the entire city by 2010. Two years after the World Expo, Shanghai's bicycle-sharing programme was mostly limited to the Minhang District.

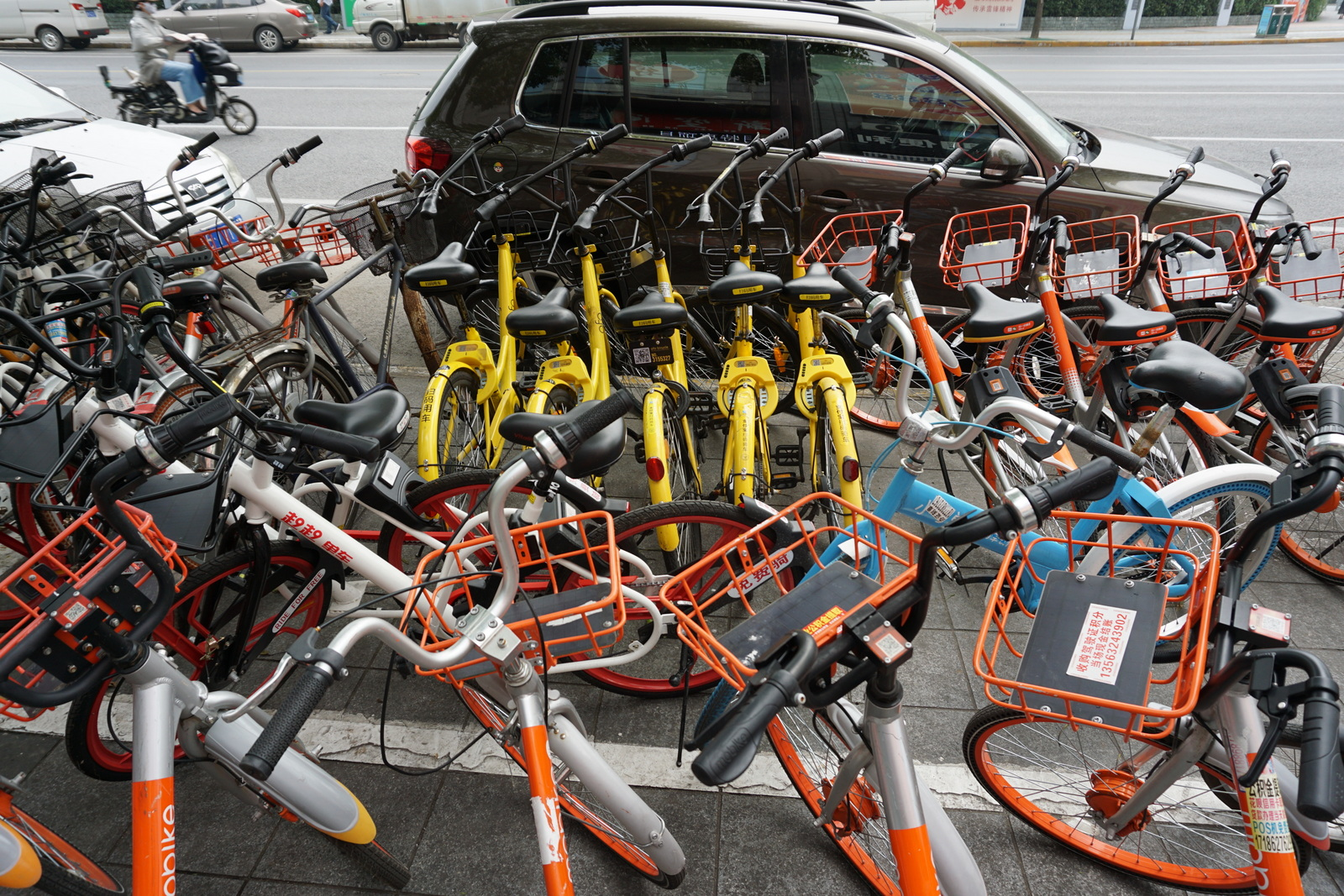
Bikes from various bike-share companies in Shanghai.

The Shanghai Bike Authority estimated that there are 280,000 shared bikes in Shanghai by March 2017, with a projected increase of 220,000 bikes by June. In March 2017, the government in Shanghai requested a temporary ban on the introduction of new private "dockless" shared bikes. Shanghai prepared regulations restricting the age of riders to between 12 and 70 and mandating the removal of bikes that have been in service for more than three years in a row. Mobike alone operates 100,000 bikes in Shanghai and has claimed to have made Shanghai into the city with the world's largest bike share network.

==== Haikou ====
Beginning around 2017, Haikou, the capital of Hainan province, experienced a massive increase in the number of dockless bikes by Ofo, Mobike, and Quick To. The Haikou Public Bike System, a traditional municipal-run docked system, has about 20,000 bicycles.

==== Wenzhou ====
Wenzhou has multiple bike share programs serving different districts of the city. The first one opened in 2012, serving Lucheng District with about 5,000 bikes and 180 stations. In 2013, a bike share with 2,200 bikes and 66 stations opened in Longwan District. At the same time, a separate bike share program with 1,040 bikes and 32 stations opened in Ouhai District. The latter of the two was being expanded to 3,250 bikes and 109 stations as of 2017. According to local government records, more than 20,000 dockless bikes from various private bike share companies had entered service in Wenzhou as of 2017.

==== Guangzhou ====
Guangzhou Bus Rapid Transit has a bike share program integrated around its stations. According to the local government, in 2017, Guangzhou had a fleet of over 700,000 bikes in various public and private bike share programs. On average 4 million trips each day were made using shared bikes. The local government is reviewing traffic management strategies and road design standards to accommodate the increase in cycling traffic.

==== Guilin ====
In 2014, Guilin City opened a docked bike sharing system with 3,000 bikes spread out over 100 stations.

==== Hangzhou ====
The Hangzhou Public Bicycle bike-sharing system has 60,600 bikes and was started in 2008. Bike-sharing stations can be found in Hangzhou every 100 metres. The first hour of use is free, followed by 1 yuan ($0.15) for the first hour, 2 yuan the second hour, and 3 yuan for each subsequent hour. In 2013 USA Today called the Hangzhou bike-sharing system the 'best in the world'. A March 2010 survey of Hangzhou Public Bicycle members and non-members found that 30% of users incorporated bicycle sharing into their most common commutes. Furthermore, the bicycle-sharing system captured modal share from bus transit, walking, autos and taxis. Another key finding from the survey suggested that car ownership may not reduce the likelihood of bike sharing use. In fact, members of the Hangzhou system exhibited a higher rate of auto ownership in comparison to non-members.

Before the arrival of private dockless systems, Hangzhou was the largest bike share system in the world until it was overtaken by Wuhan. In 2011, the system had 2,050 bike-share stations with a fleet of over 50,000 bikes and serving 240,000 trips per day. By 2015, it was expanded to over 84,000 bikes and 3,354 stations.

==== Nanning ====
Since December 2013, Nanning has had a bicycle-sharing system with 1000 bicycles and 50 stations. The first hour of usage is free, and afterward it costs 2RMB/h. By 2014, it was expanded to about 25,000 bikes and 896 stations.

==== Ningbo ====
A municipal docked bike share program opened in 2013 with 7,500 bikes and 300 stations. By 2015, it was expanded to 30,000 bikes spread over 1,240 stations across the city.

==== Quanzhou ====
A municipal docked bike share program, operated by Taiwan-based YouBike, opened in 2016 with over 200 stations and a fleet of 6,000 bikes. As of 2017, it was being expanded to 410 stations with over 18,000 bikes.

==== Shaoxing ====
In 2011, a 1,500-bike, 26-station bike sharing system opened in Shaoxing. In 2012, it was expanded by 2,000 bikes and 50 stations.

Suzhou

The Suzhou Industrial Park has a bicycle-sharing system (苏州工业园区公共自行车) with 1,880 bicycles and 72 stations, which launched in January 2012.

Xi'an

Since 2011, Xi'an has had a bicycle-sharing system with 8,000 bicycles and 375 stations. By 2016, it was expanded to 52,000 public bicycles and 1,800 stations.

Lanzhou

In 2014, a bike sharing system was created around downtown Lanzhou with 377 stations.

Kunming

A municipal docked bike share program opened in 2015 with 5,000 bikes and over 700 stations. In 2017, the system was expected to consist of 2,500 bike stations as far south as Chenggong District and approximately 45,000 bicycles. Kunming expects to expand its bicycle-sharing system to 6,500 stations by 2019. Bicycles are free for the first hour, 0.5 yuan for each additional half hour, and 15 yuan for an entire day.

=== Hong Kong ===
Major bicycle sharing operations in Hong Kong include ofo, Hoba Bike, Ketch'Up Bike, LocoBike, and oBike.

The first dockless bike sharing provider in Hong Kong, Gobee.bike, launched in April 2017 but terminated in July 2018.

Plans were announced by Cleantech Solutions in 2017 to enable users to rent bikes from multiple providers, by providing an app with a centralised list of available bicycles across all providers.

=== Iran ===
==== Tehran ====
In July 2016, the first Iranian modern public bike system was designed and established in Urmia city with 250 bikes in 20 stations by ASI company under the brand name "U Bike". Later, in 2018, the Bdood bike-sharing was launched in Tehran.

=== India ===
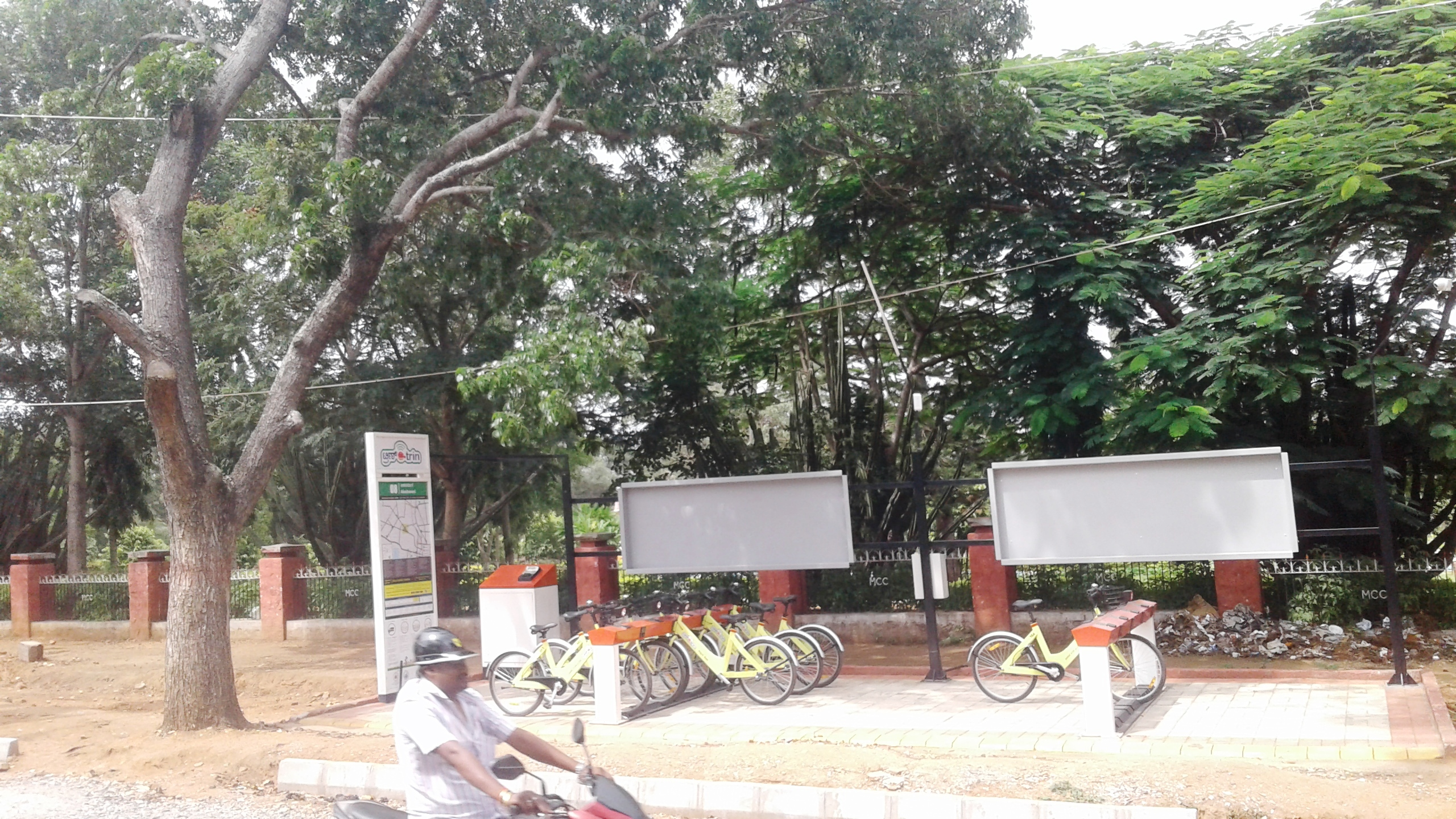
Bicycle-sharing in Mysore, India.

==== Mumbai ====
Mumbai operates two bicycle-sharing schemes, and as of 2011 the Ministry of Urban Development was preparing to launch a 10-city public bike scheme as part of its "Mission for Sustainable Habitat".

==== Mysuru (Mysore) ====
Mysore was the first Indian city to initiate cycle sharing in 2009. As of 2009, it had 28 locations and 52 planned locations.

==== Ahmedabad ====
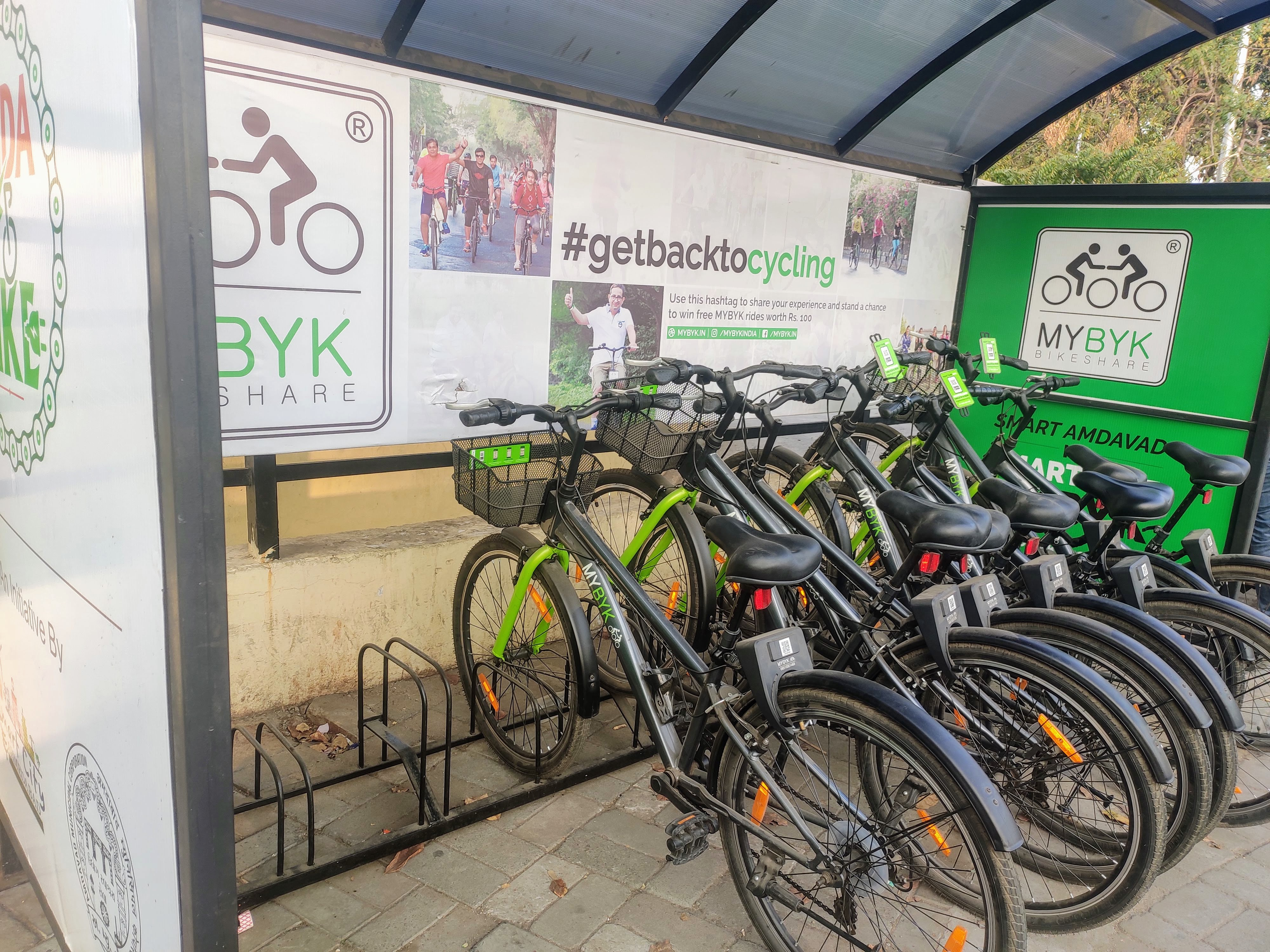
MyByk Cycle Station at Ahmedabad, India.

A MyByk cycle sharing program in Ahmedabad started with eight stations in the city in 2013. Subscribers can keep bicycles as long as required without having to return them.

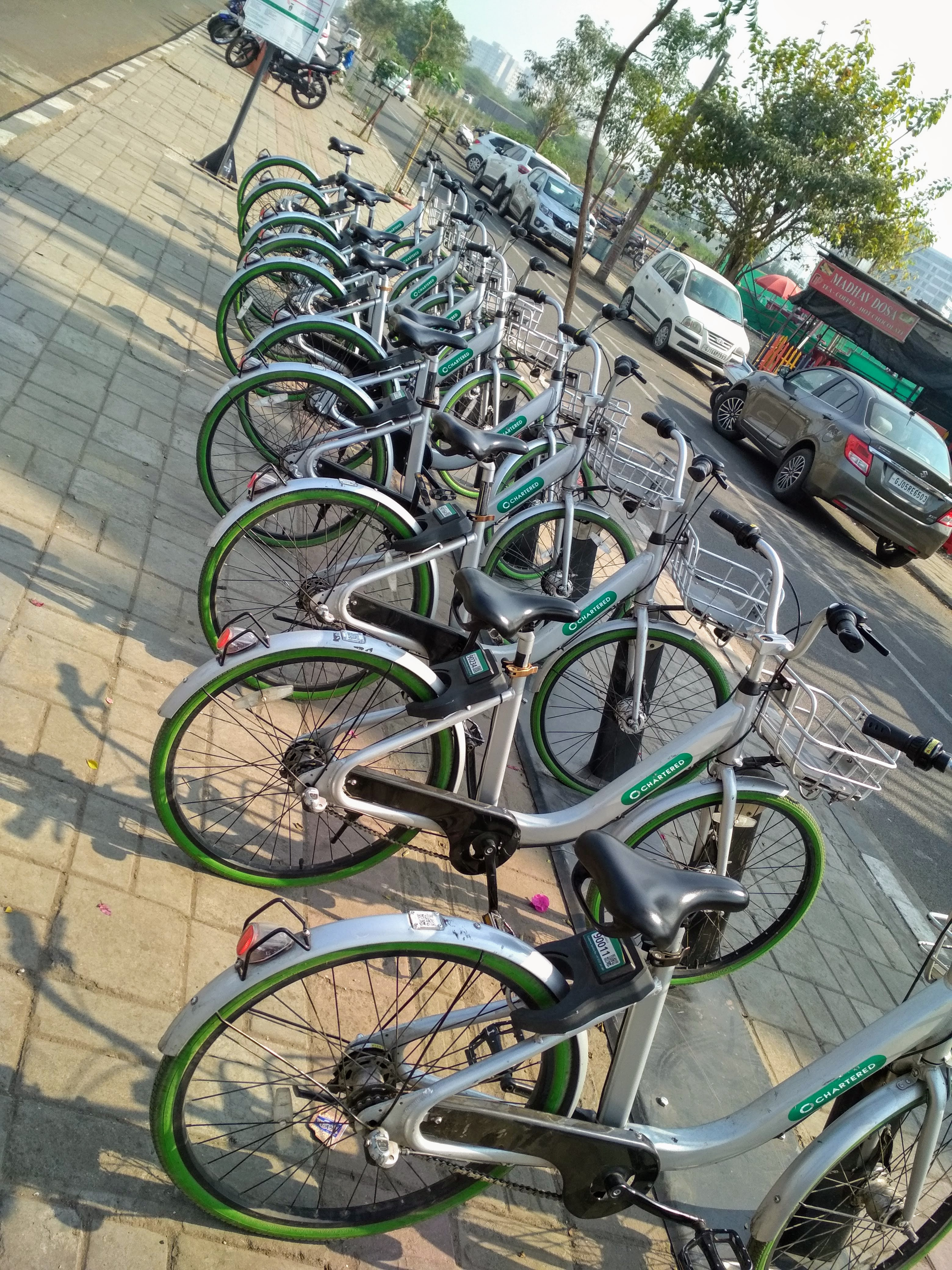
Bicycle station at Surat, India.

==== New Delhi ====
The Delhi Metro Rail Corporation (DMRC) launched a software-based Public bicycle sharing (PBS) scheme through which commuters can rent cycles from a residential area and travel to the nearest Metro station and then rent a cycle from a departing Metro station for use in nearby localities.

==== Bhubaneswar ====
In 2018, a Public bicycle sharing (PBS) system was launched in Bhubaneshwar. The bikes included Hexi bikes, Yana and Yulu, and comprised 2000 bikes overall.

==== Pune ====
Many bicycle-sharing systems started in Pune. One system was initiated by PedalSaddle, providing cycles for rent for cheaper than public transportation. In January 2018, Chinese bicycle-sharing company Ofo launched a dockless bicycle-sharing services in Pune.

==== Other cities ====
Bicycle-sharing systems are used in other cities including Rajkot, Bhubaneswar, Vadodara (Baroda), Ranchi, Surat, Udaipur, Jamnagar and Panchkula.

=== Indonesia ===
Bike2Work

Bike2Work has operated as a bicycle-sharing network since 2004. As of 2015, it has 130 branches across Indonesia, including in Jakarta.

Bandung

The Bandung municipal government operates 30 stations with 270 bikes, called Boseh Bikesharing.

Jakarta

Gowes, which means "to paddle" in Indonesian, started operation in limited areas of Jakarta in 2018. Gowes was discontinued in December 2022, in order to be switched with an alternative using electric bicycles.

=== Israel ===
Tel-Aviv

Tel-O-Fun, started in 2011, is a bicycle-sharing program in Tel-Aviv with 2,000 bicycles and 200 stations throughout the city and in some surrounding towns.

=== Japan ===
Docomo's bike share service has 10,800 bicycles and 2,190 stations in Japan, most of them in Tokyo. Other services include HELLO CYCLING, P!PPA, COGICOGI, Charichari, ecobike, LUUP.

==== History ====
According to the Ministry of Land, Infrastructure, Transport and Tourism, in 2012, there were already a number of city-level pilot schemes in operation in Japan, the largest of which was in Tokyo's Edogawa City with 500 cycles available for hire. Toyama also has a bicycle-sharing system, that takes the region's public transit IC card Passca.

=== Kazakhstan ===
Astana-Bike in the capital Astana, has 200 bikes in 40 stations, and 1000 bikes for Expo 2017.

Shymkent-bike in Shymkent, 200 bikes in 44 stations.

Almaty-bike in Almaty, September 2016.

=== Malaysia ===
==== George Town ====
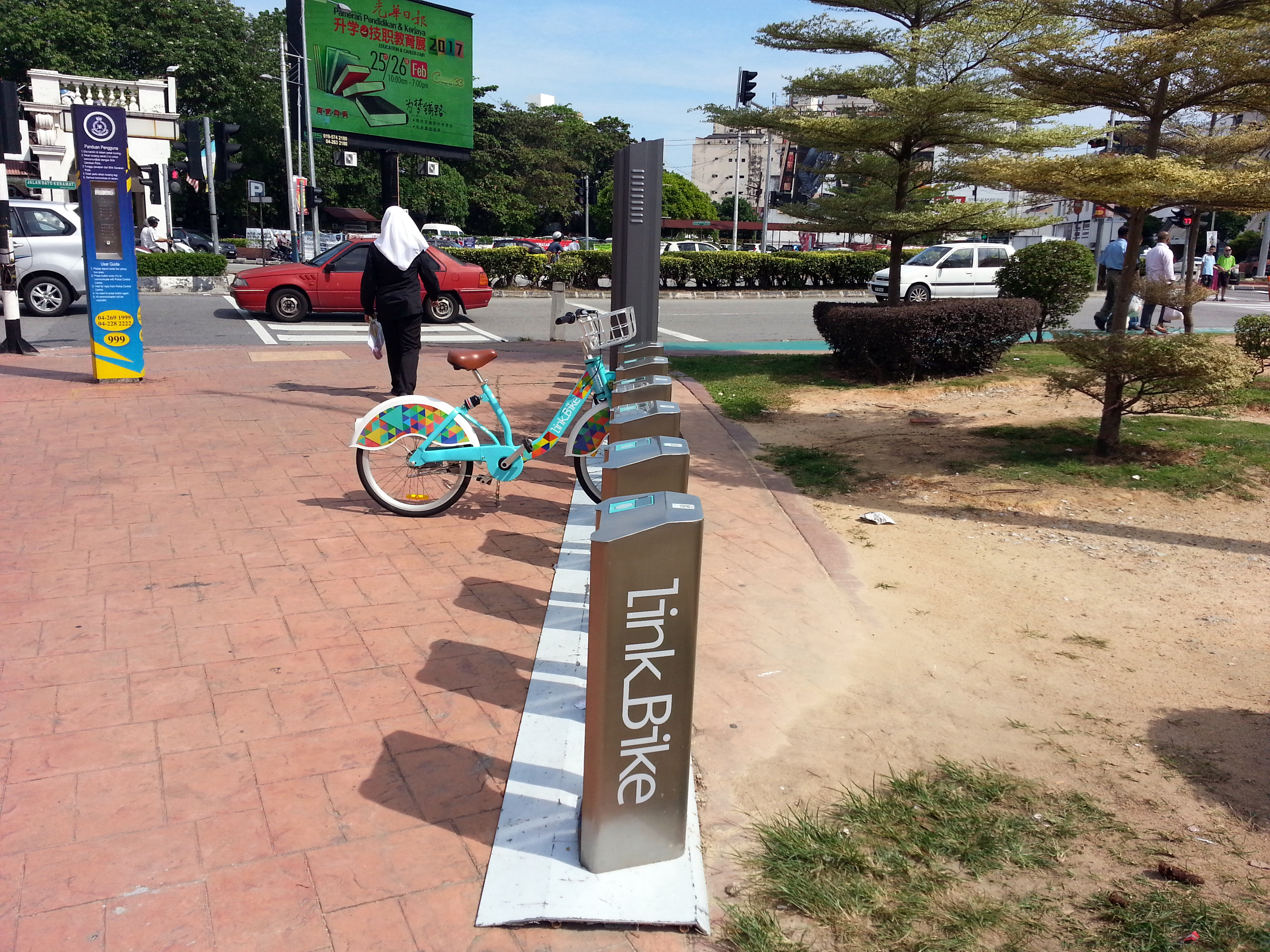
A LinkBike station in George Town, Penang.

LinkBike in George Town, Penang commenced operations in December 2016 with 60 bicycles, making it the first city in Malaysia to introduce a public bicycle-sharing system. This service has since been expanded to 250 bicycles and 25 stations throughout George Town, covering destinations between Gurney Drive to the north and Queensbay Mall to the south.

==== Kota Kinabalu ====
In March 2017, the Kota Kinabalu City Hall implemented a bicycle sharing service with 20 bicycles initially made available. Users of the service were required to have a City Hall 'touch and go' card with RM200 (U$45) as a deposit to use a bicycle for 24 hours. The deposit was refunded when the bicycle was returned. Its stations are available in major hotels in the city as well as in Tanjung Lipat and in front of the Grace Court apartment in Sembulan, with another 150 bicycles available in stores.

==== Klang Valley ====
The Subang Jaya LRT/KTM station was selected for a bicycle-sharing system from the Singaporean company oBike in 2017. Riders were to be charged RM1.00 per 15 minutes of usage.

=== South Korea ===
==== Seoul ====
Following trials, a bike-sharing system named Ddareungi was introduced in Seoul in October 2015 in select areas on the right bank of the Han River. After a few months, the number of stations reached 150 and 1500 bikes were made available. In 2016, the number of stations increased to cover new districts. As of July 2016, there were about 300 stations and 3000 bikes available, and Seoul mayor Park Won-soon confirmed his intention to increase the number of bikes available to 20,000.

=== Taiwan ===
==== National systems ====
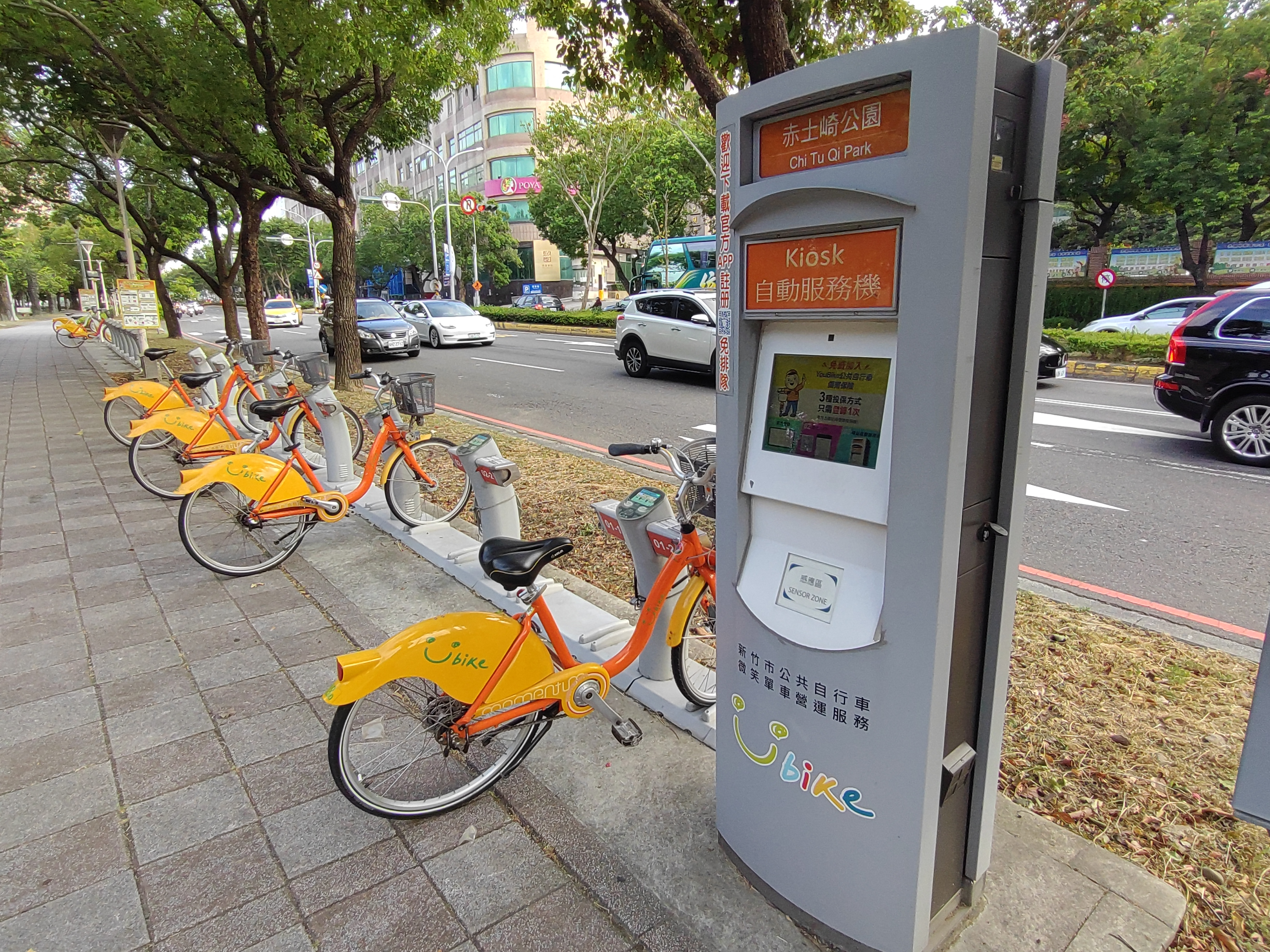
A YouBike station in Hsinchu City, Taiwan.

YouBike is the largest bicycle-sharing service in Taiwan. Launched in Taipei City in 2009 and expanded through cooperation between the Taipei City Government and Taiwanese bike manufacturer Giant, the system saw 22 million rentals in 2014, double the 11 million rentals in the previous year.

Singaporean dockless bicycle-sharing platform oBike launched in Taiwan in April 2017 under the management of Taiwan's Aozhi Network Technology Co., Ltd. The parking of the bikes in public areas such as sidewalks and motorcycle parking spaces caused controversy. The service has shut down in June 2017, with all the bikes left on street.

==== Kaohsiung ====
The southern city of Kaohsiung launched the country's first bicycle-sharing service, CityBike, on 1 March 2009 with 20 stations and 1,500 Merida bikes. The service has been replaced by YouBike 2.0 since July 2020.

=== Turkey ===
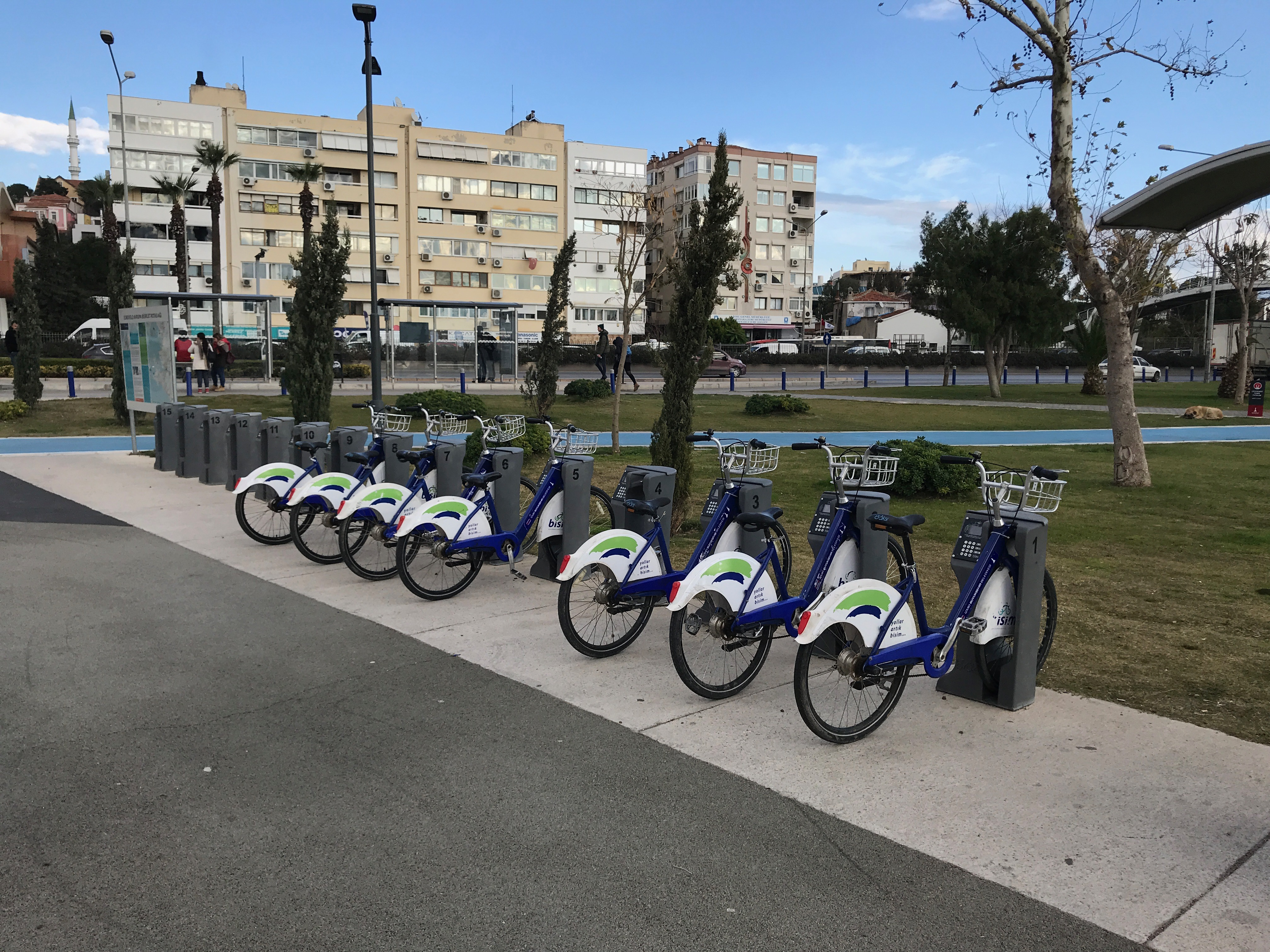
A Bisim station in İzmir, Turkey

Public bike sharing services in Turkey use the Baksi system. In Istanbul, the system called İsbike, which was launched in 2012, has 140 stations and 1,500 bikes. In İzmir, the Metropolitan Municipality launched a system called Bisim in 2014. It had 40 stations and 550 bikes as of 2020.

Similar systems are operational in Antalya, Eskişehir, Kayseri, Kocaeli, Konya, and Samsun.

=== United Arab Emirates ===
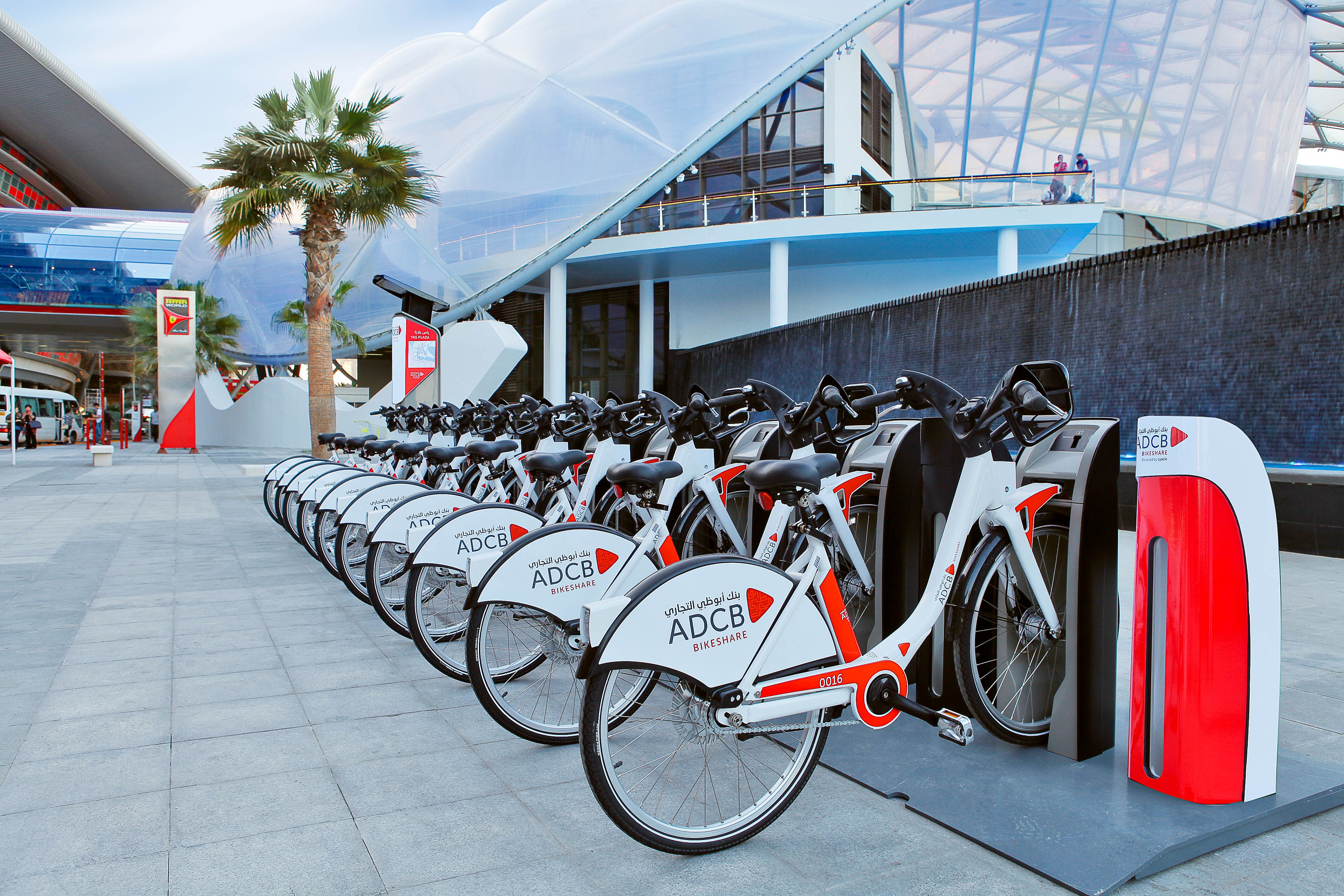
8D Technologies bike station for ADCB Bikeshare in Abu Dhabi.

ADCB Bikeshare scheme operates in the nation's capital city of Abu Dhabi, and is sponsored by Abu Dhabi Commercial Bank. ADCB Bikeshare launched in December 2015. Run by Cyacle, the programme operates on Yas Island and Al Raha Beach, where there are 11 stations with 75 bicycles available for hire. In the first eight months of operation, 5,641 people became members of the scheme and rode 78,689 kilometres (48,895 miles) on 8,536 trips.

The German bike sharing company Nextbike temporarily also operated a bike sharing scheme in Dubai, but apparently discontinued it.

=== Uzbekistan ===
In 2024, a powerbank-sharing startup, Q.watt, launched bike-sharing in Tashkent.

== Australia and Oceania ==
=== Australia ===
A number of Australian cities have had docking shared bike systems since 2010. In 2017, dockless bike sharing commenced in all the capital cities. The dockless systems experienced a higher degree of vandalism, including bikes dumped in rivers, than in other countries. The dockless services all provided helmets with the bikes.

==== Docked systems ====
Melbourne Bike Share (MBS) was the first municipal bicycle share system in Australia, launched in Melbourne in June 2010. It started with 10 stations. Usage was lower than expected and has required ongoing public subsidy. Take-up was affected by the location of docking stations and the legal requirement for riders wear helmets, which are not provided with the bikes. Ridership doubled when $5 helmets were offered for sale from vending machines. The MBS used 500 cycles at about 50 stations around Melbourne's central business district before it was shut down in November 2019.

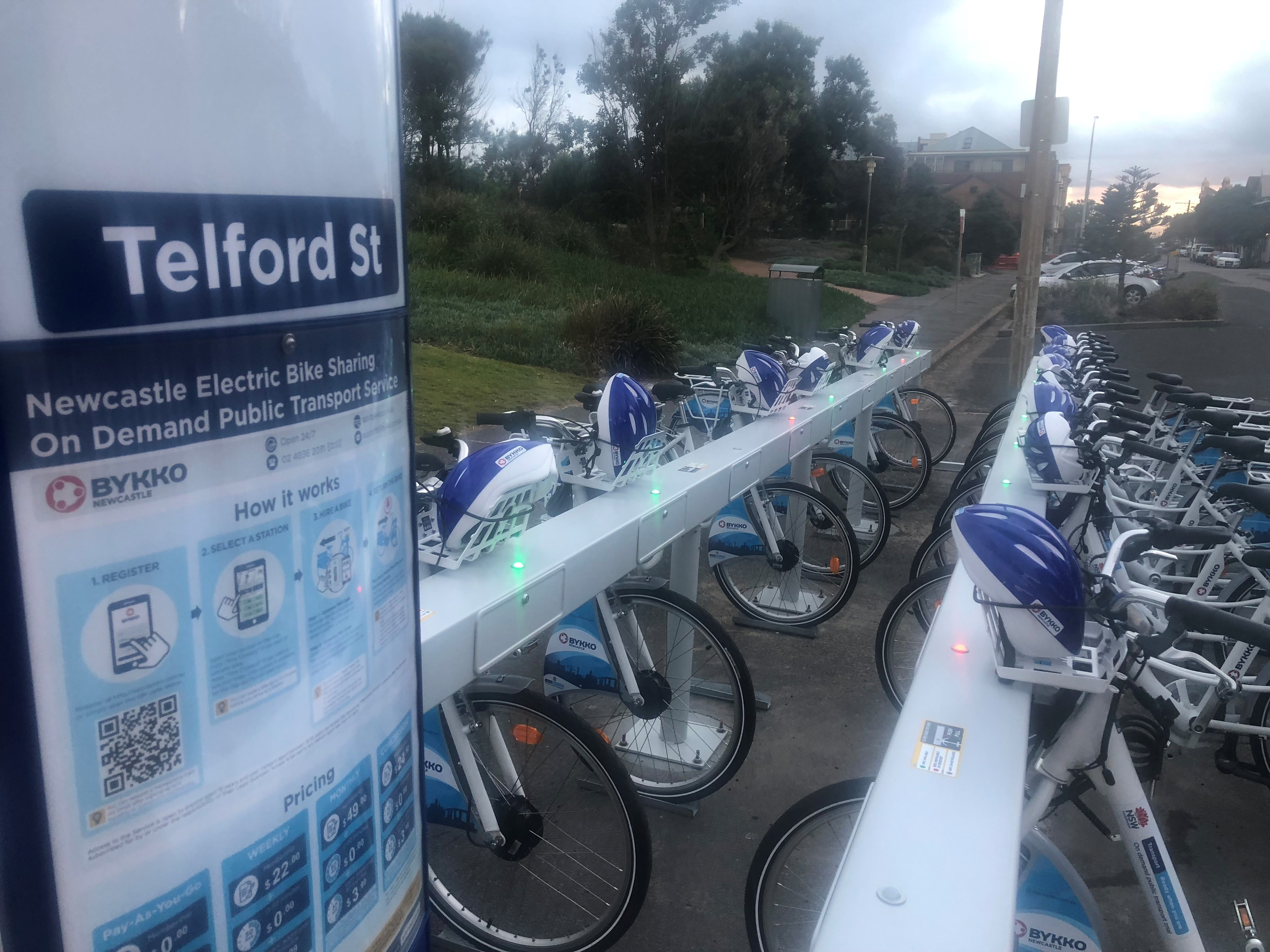
One of nineteen e-bike docking stations across Newcastle CBD, NSW, Australia.

Newcastle's central business district launched an e-bike share scheme on 21 May 2018, including 19 docking stations with 100 electric bikes. The bike scheme was launched as a partnership between the operator BYKKO, and Transport for NSW. An initial pilot program funded with $2000AUD of council grant money was conducted, though evidence of the evaluation does not appear to be posted publicly. After speaking with the local newspaper, BYKKO said the aim of the project is to complement the existing public transport system.

The Brisbane CityCycle, operated by JCDecaux, started on 1 September 2010 and grew to include 2000 bikes in 150 stations. Its operation depended on public subsidy. Initially, helmets were not provided with the bikes, but this was later changed. After only achieving 80,000 trips in its first twelve months, this increased to 522,388 in the 2016-17 financial year.

==== Dockless systems ====
In 2017 dockless systems were launched in a number of Australian cities.

Sydney

- Airbike launched in Adelaide, Canberra, and Sydney.
- oBike has placed 1,000 bikes since July 2017.
- Reddy Go started with 1,500 bikes, also in July 2017, and has expanded to over 2,000 bikes. The company exited Sydney in July 2018, citing "red tape".
- Ofo launched with 600 bikes in October 2017. In July 2018 Ofo announced it was leaving Australia.
- Mobike distributed up to 500 bikes in November 2017.

Melbourne

- oBike placed 1,250 bikes in Melbourne since July 2017. There was vandalism of the bikes in the first few months, including some being dumped in the Yarra River.

Perth

- Urbi bike-share began a 12-month trial operating within the City of Joondalup in September 2017.

Adelaide

Ofo distributed 50 bikes throughout North Adelaide in October 2017. In July 2018 Ofo announced it was leaving Australia.

Airbike launched in Adelaide.

Brisbane

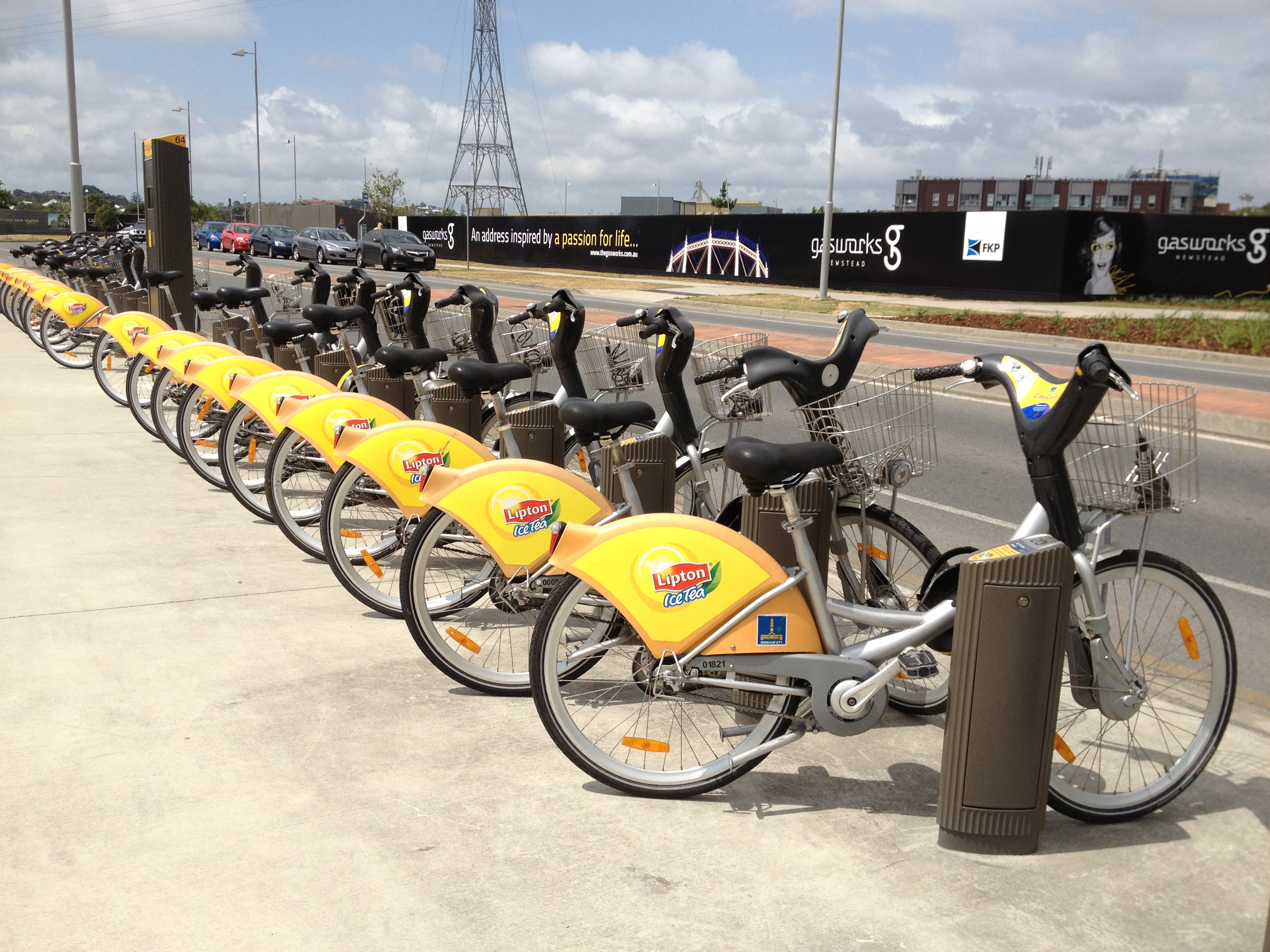
A bicycle sharing station in Newstead, Brisbane.

Subscriptions for CityCycle, a Vélib'-style community bike hire scheme by JCDecaux for Brisbane started on 1 September 2010 and grew to include 2000 bikes in 150 stations from the University of Queensland to Tenerife. Its operation depended on public subsidy. Initially, helmets were not provided with the bikes but this was later changed. After logging only 80,000 trips in its first twelve months, by 2016-17 this had increased to 522,388.

The bikes were linked to the public transport go card – a single card covering all buses, trains, ferries, and the Gold Coast light rail system. In 2017 it was announced new bank card facilities would be added to the stations.

After ten years of operation, the hire scheme's decommission was announced for 2021. Throughout 2021, CityCycle stations were removed to make way for shared e-bikes.

Gold Coast

Mobike started with 200 bikes around Surfers Paradise and Broadbeach in February 2018 with the number expected to grow to 2,000 by the time of the Commonwealth Games in April. Mobike was granted exclusive rights to operate bike sharing by the local council and will partner with Transit Australia Group and Good Cycles.

=== New Zealand ===
In both Auckland and Christchurch, Nextbike provides some limited cycle sharing facilities; plans are in hand to expand these. The New Zealand Transport Agency is working with Auckland Transport and the Christchurch City Council respectively to investigate cycle sharing schemes for each city. Independently, a private consortium proposed having a scheme in place in Auckland in 2017.

Onzo NZ is the first and largest dockless bike sharing platform to launch in New Zealand, beginning in Auckland in late 2017, and in Wellington in 2018.

== Universities ==
=== Canada ===
- University of British Columbia, Vancouver – Purple and Yellow Bikes

=== India ===
- Indian Institute of Science, Bangalore – NammaCycle
- Birla Institute of Technology, Mesra, Ranchi -Desi Wheels
- Indian Institute of Technology, Bombay – Zoomcar PEDL

=== Jordan ===
- Jordan University of Science and Technology, Irbid – Darajty (دراجتي)

=== Mexico ===
- National Autonomous University of Mexico, Mexico City – Bicipuma

=== United Kingdom ===
Several cycle hire schemes in UK towns and cities overlap their university areas, e.g. the one at Stirling. Others, e.g. Leeds, offer longer-term cycle hire. Kingston University is reported to have a scheme called KU Bikes that was due to begin in early 2018, while Derby anticipates that Hourbike will run a scheme in Derby operating electric bikes, around the same time.

- University of Nottingham, Nottingham – Ucycle

=== United States ===
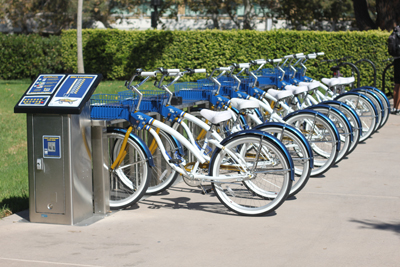
Zotwheels Bike Share at the University of California Irvine.

- Belmont University, Nashville, Tennessee – Belmont Bikes
- California State University, East Bay, Hayward, California – Zagster (service cancelled)
- College of Charleston, Charleston, South Carolina – Bike Share
- Cornell College, Mount Vernon, Iowa – Purple Bikes
- Cornell University, Ithaca, New York – Big Red Bikes
- Duke University, Durham, North Carolina – Zagster
- Emory University, Druid Hills, Georgia – Bike Emory
- Florida State University, Tallahassee, Florida – ReCycle Program
- Georgia Institute of Technology, Atlanta, Georgia – viaCycle@GT
- Hamilton College, Clinton, New York – Gilded Bicycle Guild (founded in 2006, returned spring 2012)
- Hampshire College, Amherst, Massachusetts – Yellow Bike Program
- Harvard University, Cambridge, Massachusetts – CrimsonBikes
- Illinois State University, Normal, Illinois – Reggie Ride
- Keene State College, Keene, New Hampshire – Green Bike Program
- Kent State University, Kent, Ohio – Flashfleet
- New York University, New York City – NYU Bike Share
- Northern Arizona University, Flagstaff, Arizona – Yellow Bike Program
- Oakland University, Rochester, Michigan – OU Bike Share
- Occidental College, Los Angeles, California – Bike Share
- Ohio State University, Columbus, Ohio – Buckeye Bikes
- Olin College, Needham, Massachusetts – GO Bikes
- Otterbein University, Westerville, Ohio – Otterbike Program
- Pennsylvania State University, State College, Pennsylvania – Zagster (until all bikes and stations were removed in June 2020)
- St. Olaf College, Northfield, Minnesota – Green Bikes
- Saint Xavier University, Chicago, Illinois – Green Bike
- Santa Clara University, Santa Clara, California – Zagster
- Southwestern University, Georgetown, Texas – Pirate Bike Program
- Stony Brook University, Stony Brook, New York – Wolf Ride – PBSC
- University of California, Irvine, Irvine, California – Zotwheels (automated bike share program, inaugurated Fall 2009)
- University of Chicago, Chicago, Illinois – recycles
- University of Cincinnati, Cincinnati, Ohio – UC Bearcats Bike Share
- University of Kentucky, Lexington, Kentucky – Wildcat Wheels,
- University of North Carolina at Chapel Hill, Chapel Hill, North Carolina – Tar Heel Bikes
- University of Pennsylvania, Philadelphia, Pennsylvania – PennCycle
- University of South Florida, Tampa, Florida – Borrow Our Bikes Program
- University of Tulsa, Tulsa, Oklahoma – Yellow Bikes
- University of Vermont, Burlington, Vermont – B.U.G. Bike Share
- Trinity College (Connecticut), Hartford, CT – Bantam Bike
- Washington State University, Pullman, Washington – WSU Green Bike Program – PBSC (operated by WSU Wellbeing, inaugurated in Fall 2009)
- Yale University, New Haven, Connecticut – Zagster until indefinite shutdown as of May 2020

== See also ==
- Alternatives to the automobile
- Bicycle sharing system
- Carsharing
- Collaborative consumption
- Outline of cycling
- Scooter-sharing system
- Sustainable transport
