= Vélivert =

Bicycle-sharing system in Saint-Étienne, France

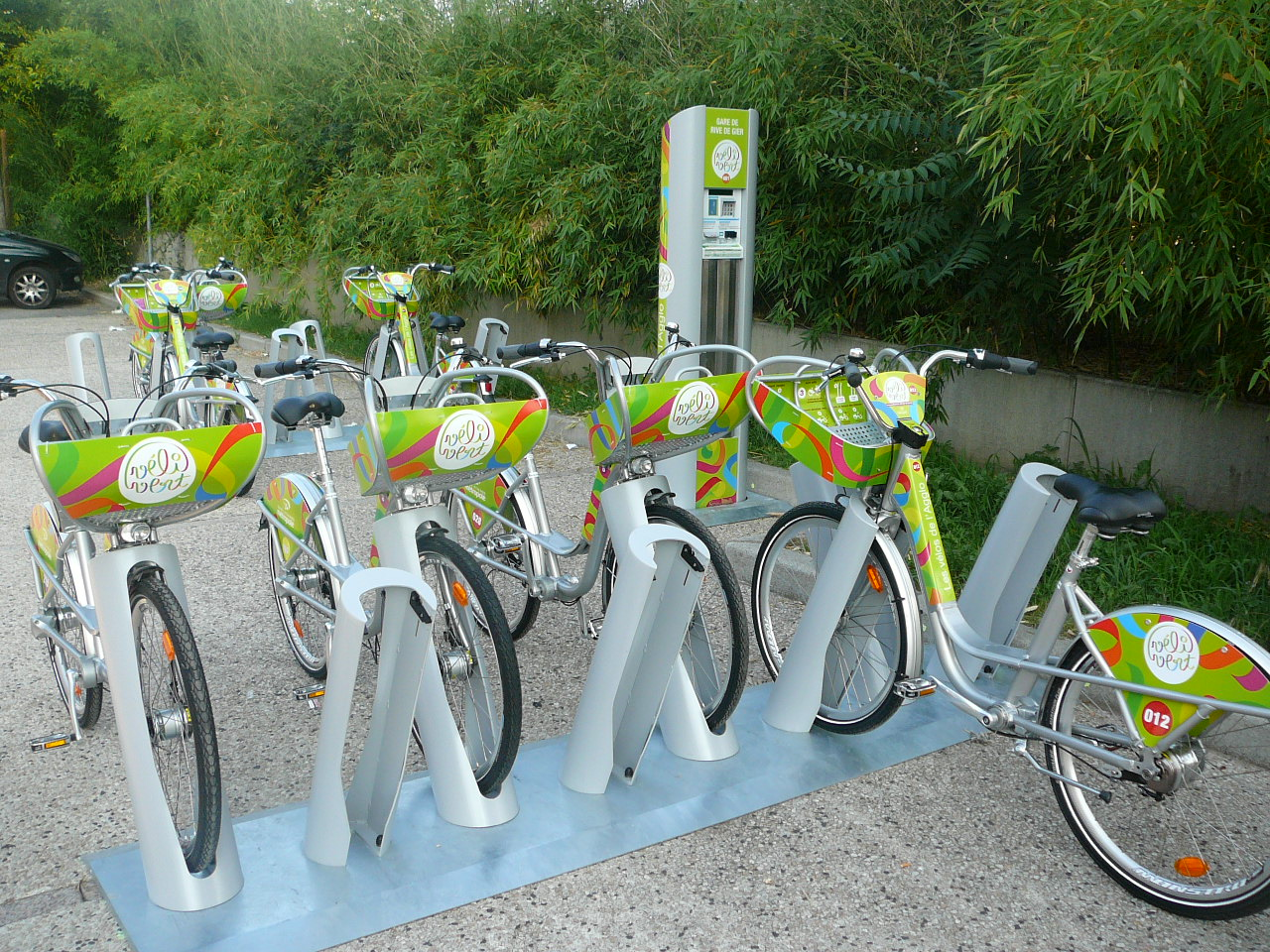
The VéliVert station "Gare de Rive de Gier".

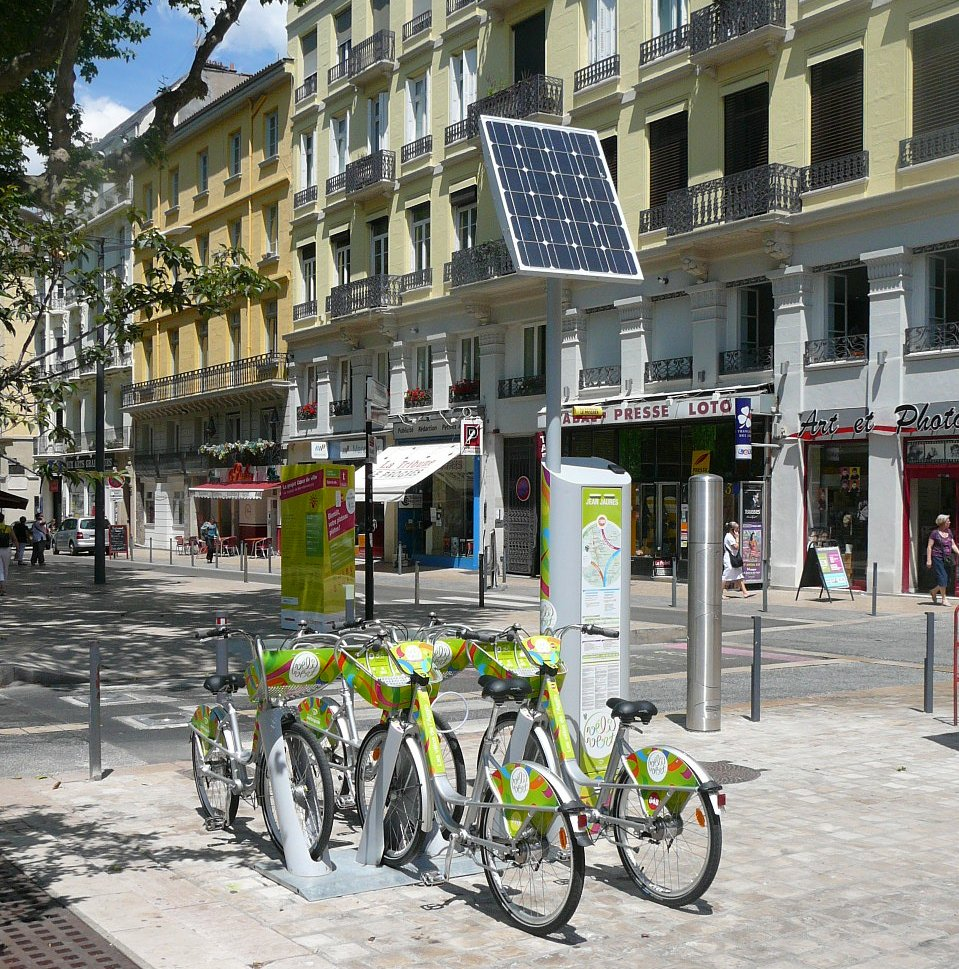
The station Jean-Jaurès.

VéliVert' is a bike sharing scheme in Saint-Étienne, France launched in June 2010, by STAS. This community bicycle program comprises 400 long term renting bicycles and 300 short term renting bicycles. The bicycles are secured in 30 bicycle stations by a special fork, in easy to install bicycle stands with mechanical keys distributed by automatic dispensers, with or without Smart Credit Card terminals, phone and international Credit Cards are as well possible to retrieve immediately a client subscription number.

The system is designed and assembled in France and accessible 24 hours per day, 7 days per week.

Smoove the firm engineering this solution, duplication of the Vélopop' and Valence, Drome: Libélo systems, with more gears (7 in hub gears) and 2 kg lighter. This system was chosen by Avignon and Valence.

== Photos ==
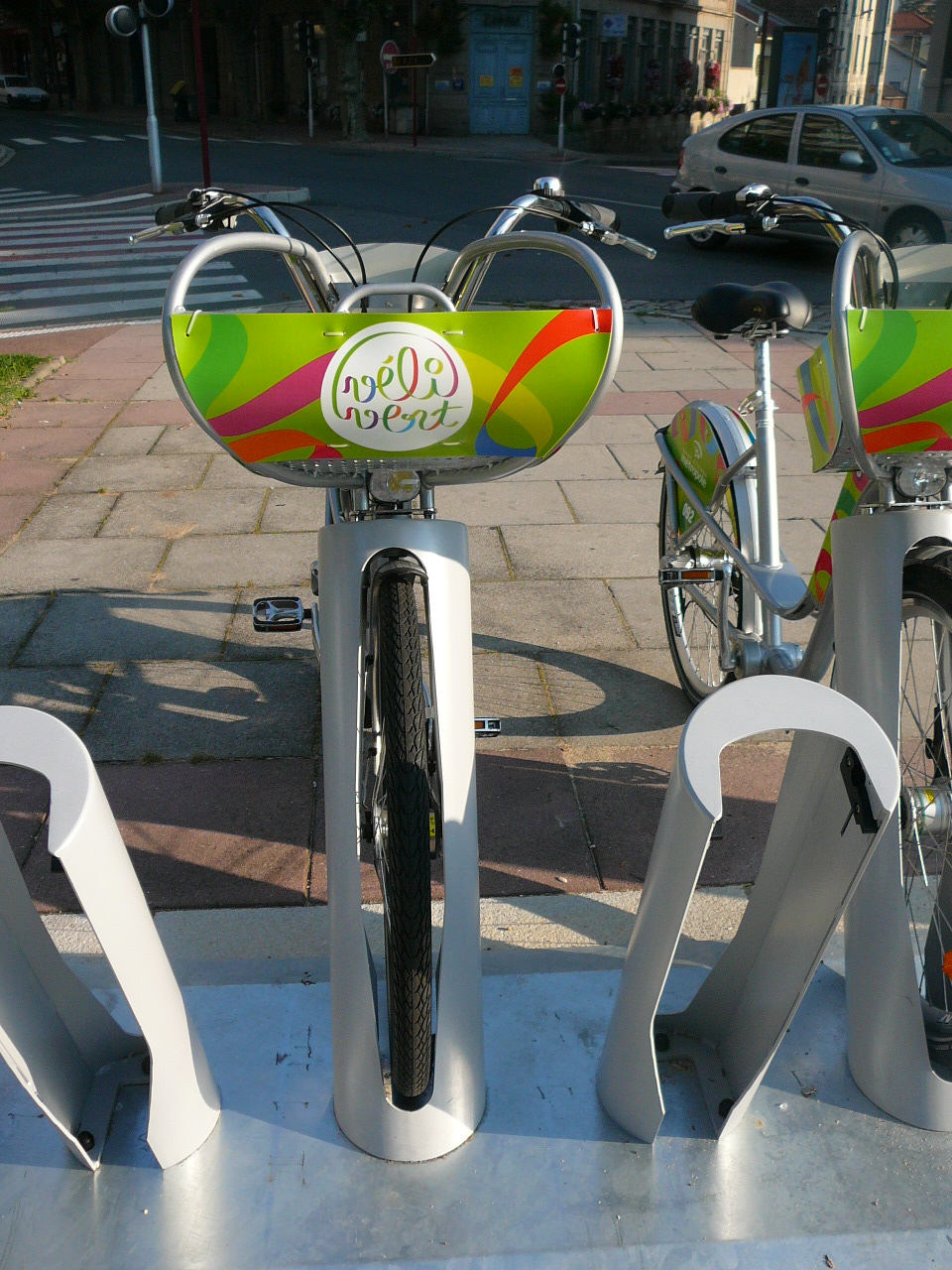
A VéliVert secured in its stand.

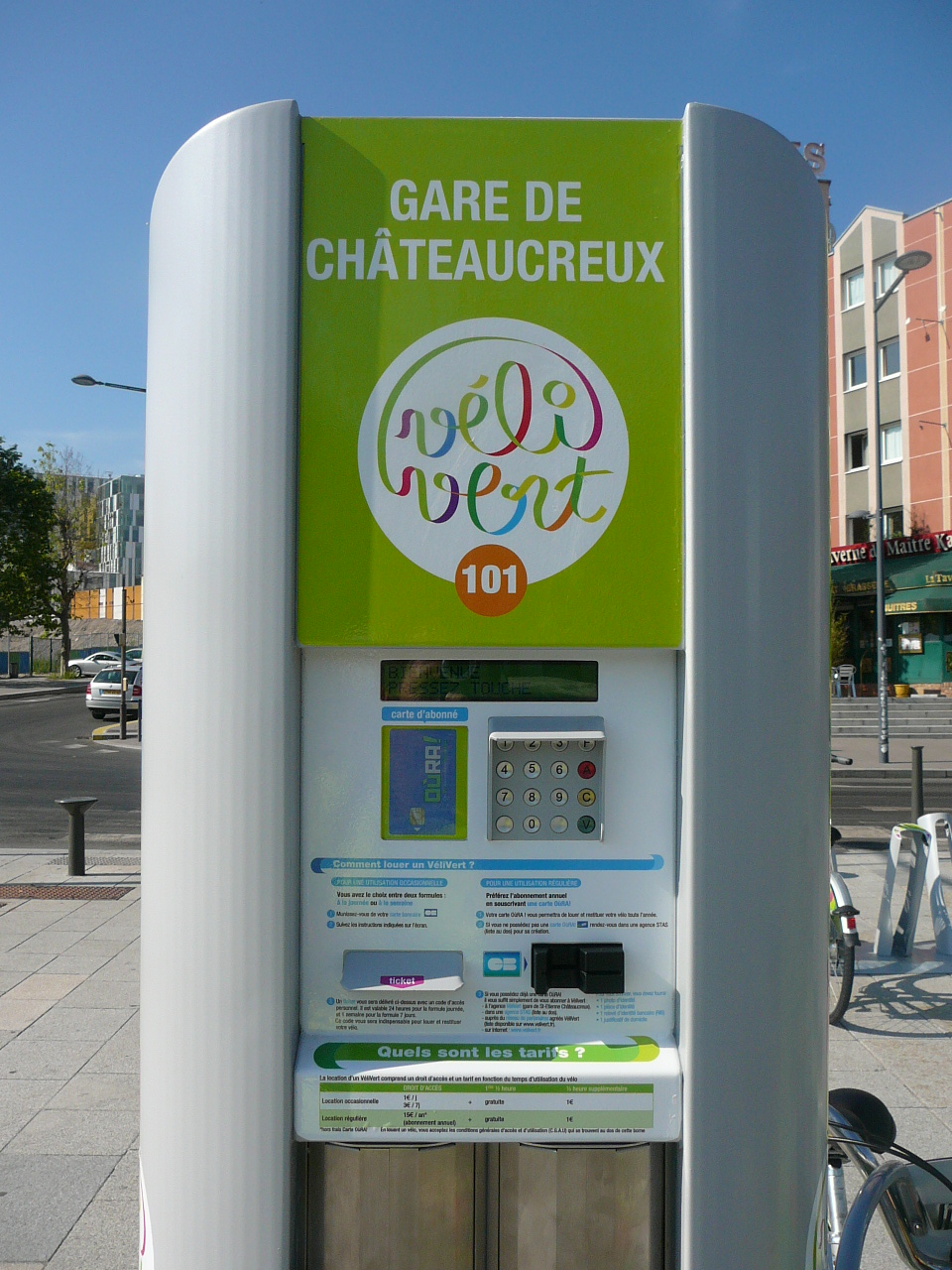
The "Gare de Châteaucreux" station in Saint-Étienne.

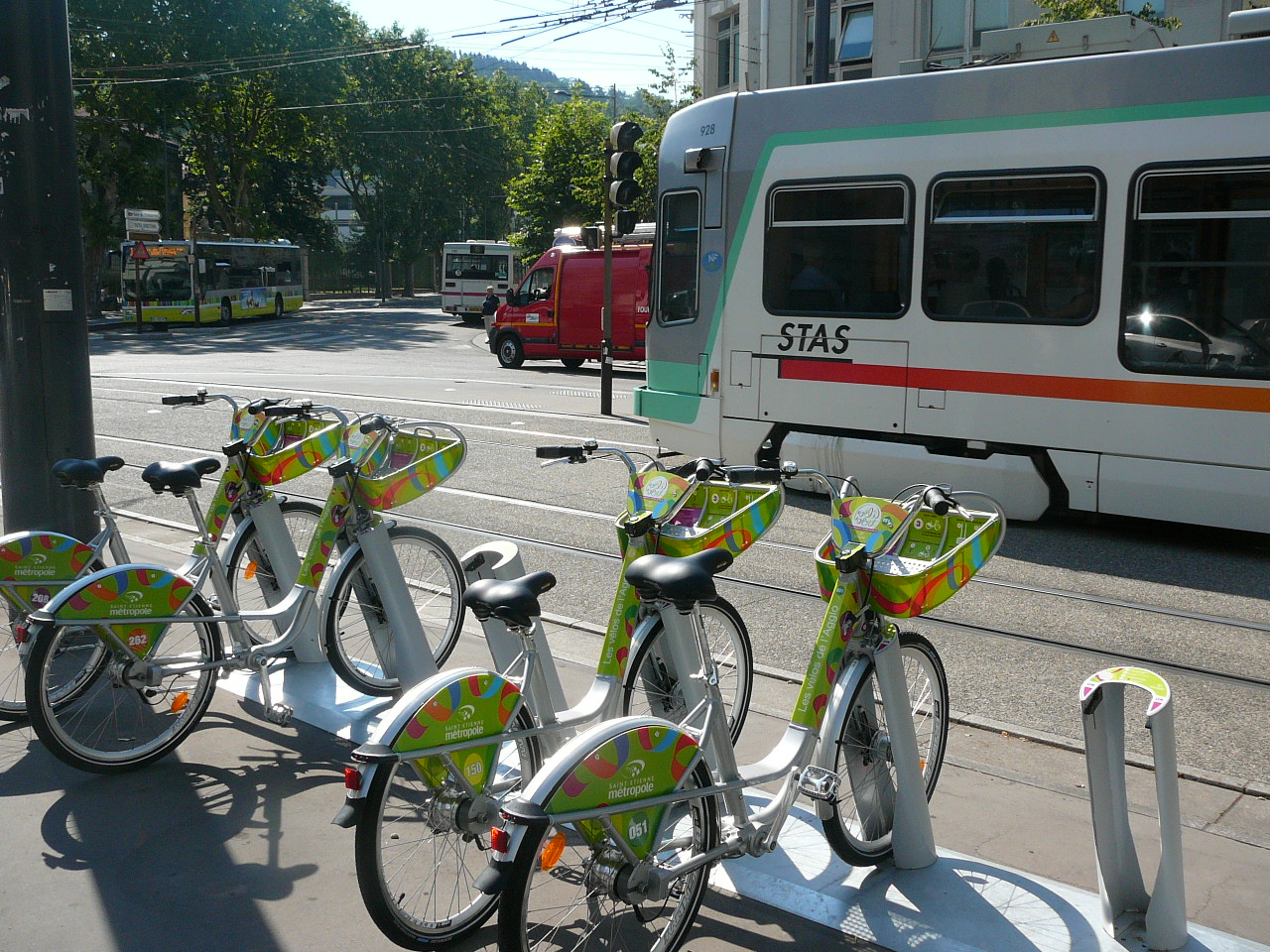
Intermodality between train, tramway, bus and VéliVert is eased by being operated all by STAS.

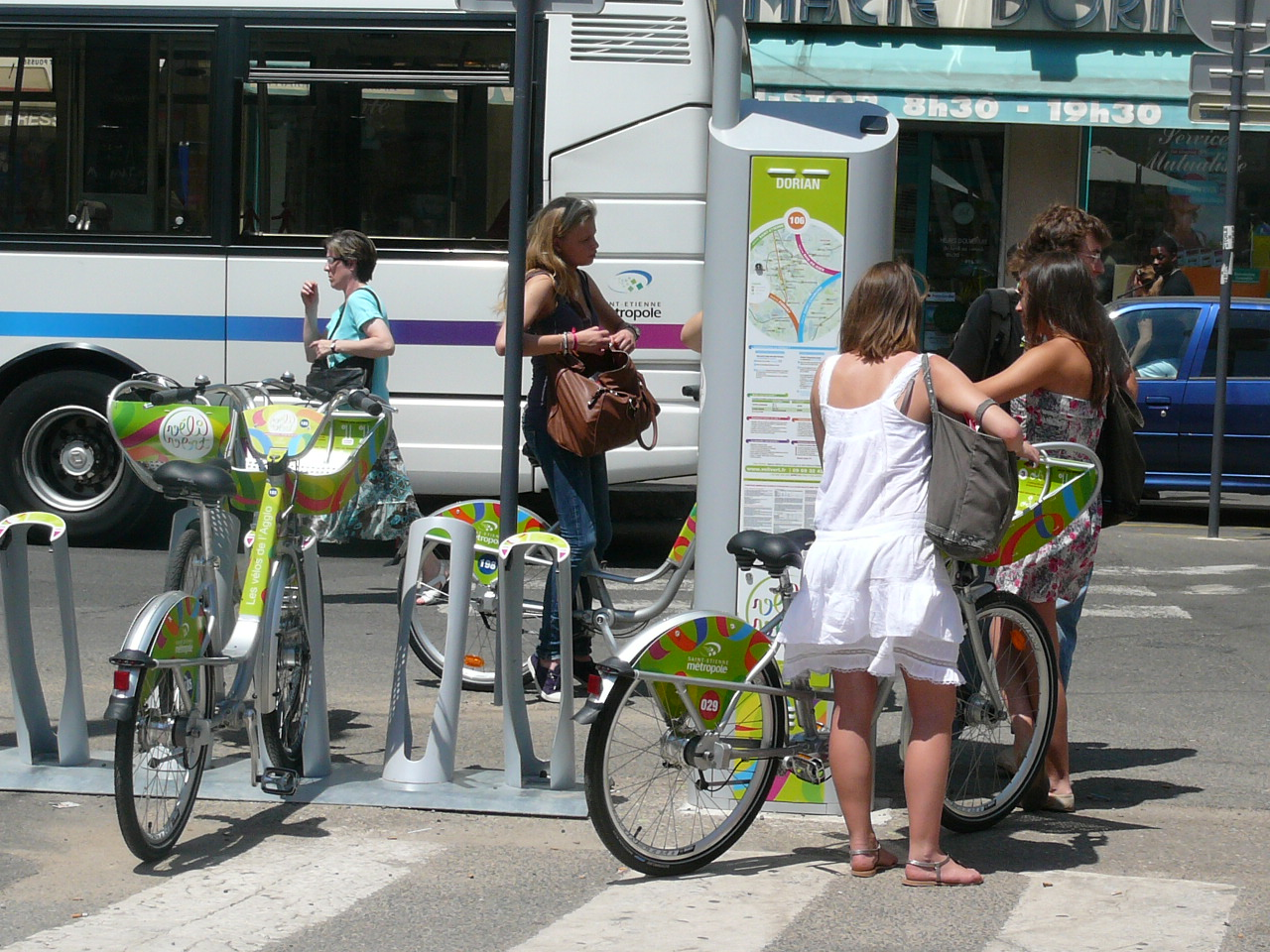
The Dorian station.
