= Société de Transports de l'Agglomération Stéphanoise =

French transport company

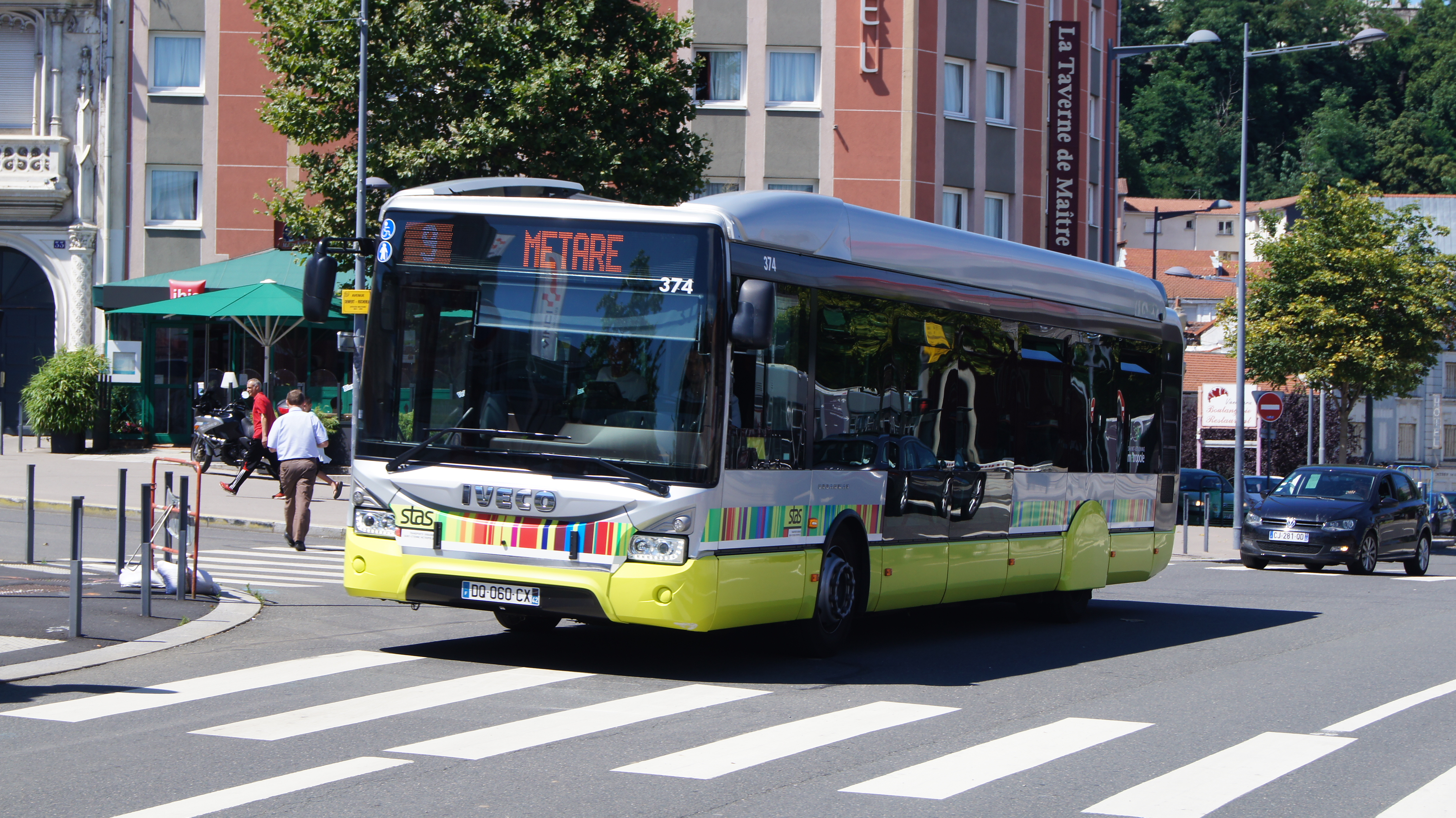
- A STAS bus in August 2016
- Parent: Transdev
- Founded: 2000
- Headquarters: Saint-Priest-en-Jarez
- Locale: Saint-Étienne
- Service area: France
- Service type: Urban bus service, trolleybus, tramway
- Routes: 72
- Stops: ~2500
- Destinations: Firminy, Saint-Priest-en-Jarez, Saint-Jean-Bonnefonds
- Website: http://www.reseau-stas.fr/

Société de Transports de l'Agglomération Stéphanoise, or STAS operates a public transport network and infrastructure in and around Saint-Étienne. Its responsibility is to provide tramway, trolleybus and bus service in the fifty-three communes of the Saint-Étienne agglomeration.

== History ==
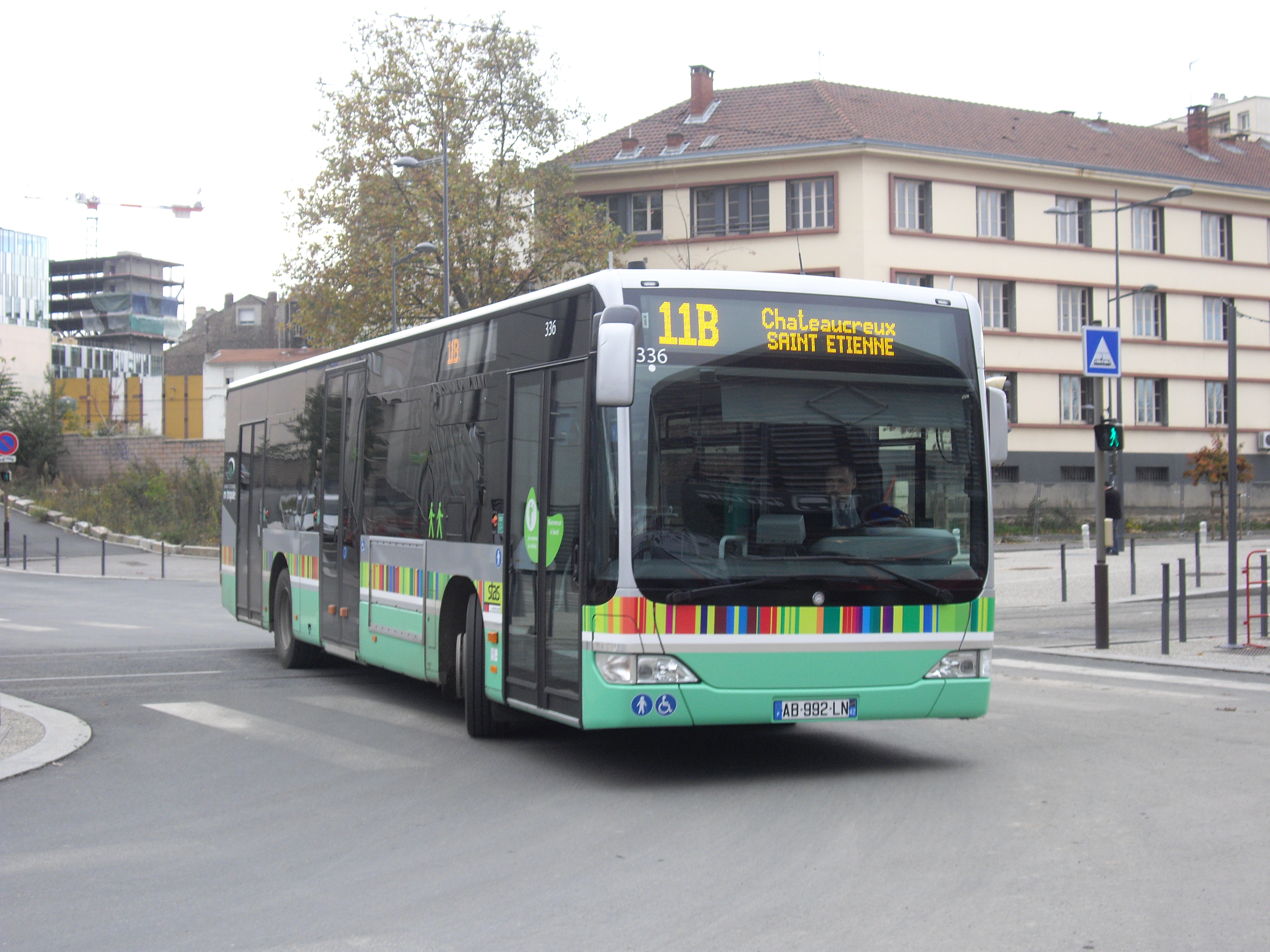
A Mercedes-Benz Citaro bus in November 2009

The company's official name, although not used is the TPAS and is a Société Anonyme with a capital of 17 700 000 euros. Its main shareholder, Transdev is the parent company. STAS was created on 1 April 2000.

== Depots ==
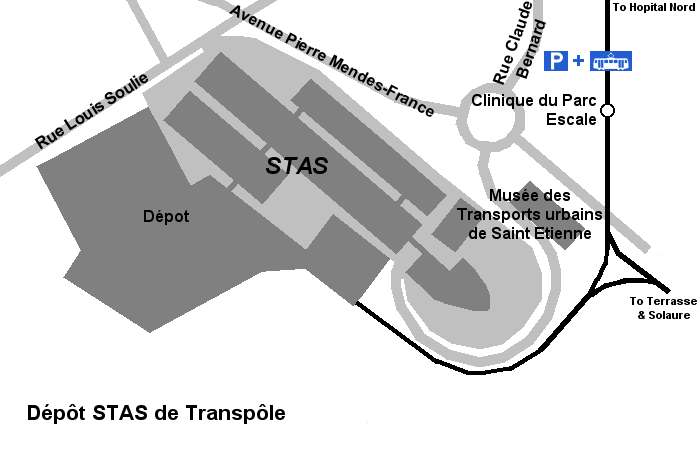
Transpôle dépot.

STAS maintains its rolling stock from three sites:

- Transpôle depot at Saint-Priest-en-Jarez (company headquarters, 9 hectares)
- Transparc depot at Saint-Étienne (2 hectares)
- Saint-Chamond depot

and is also responsible for sites throughout the Saint-Étienne:

- An information point and reseller, Place Dorian in Saint-Étienne
- park and ride at Saint-Priest-en-Jarez
- Musée des Transports Urbains de Saint-Étienne et sa Région, transport museum.

== Fleet ==
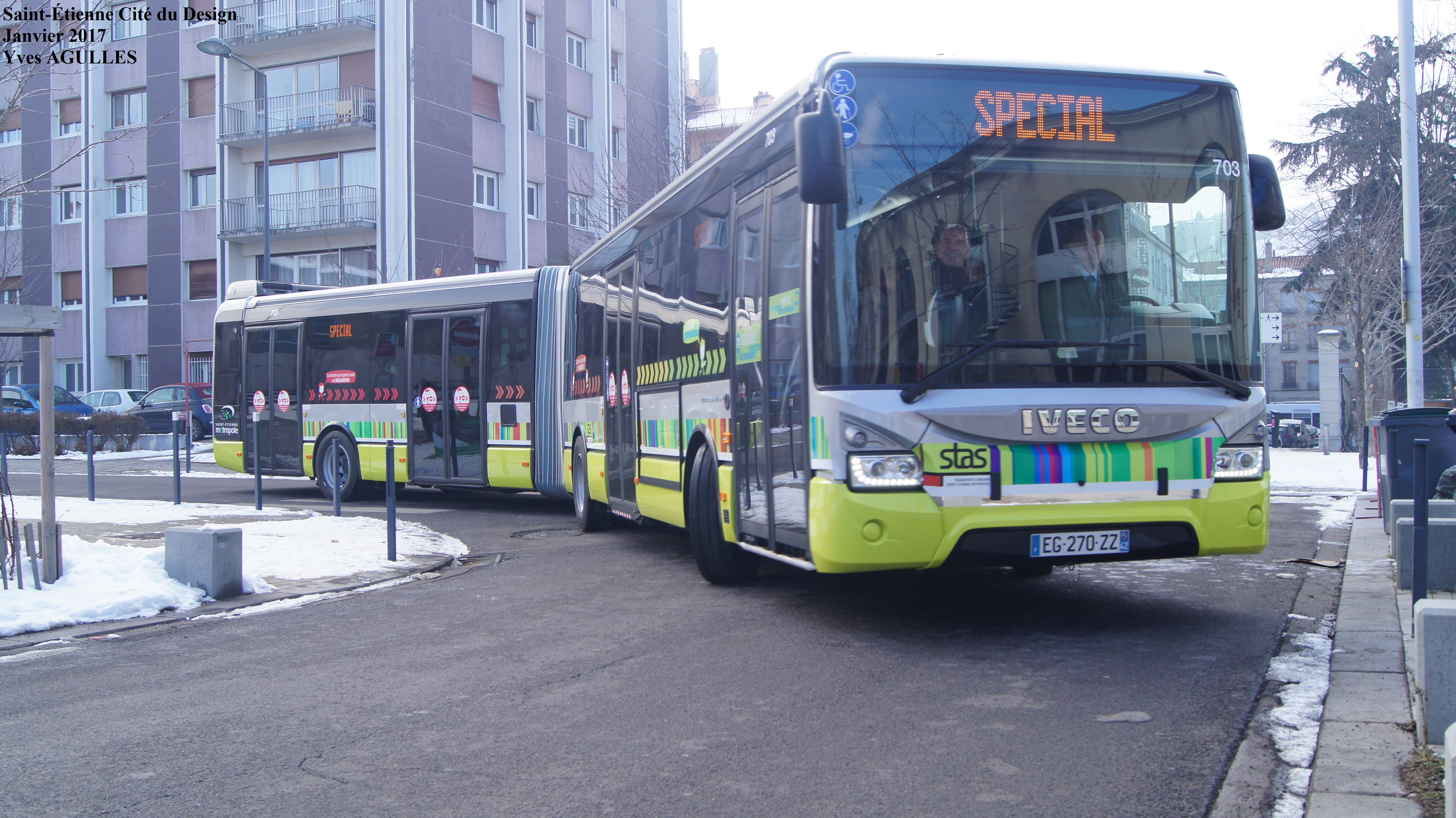
An Iveco articulated bus in January 2017

The STAS providing a diverse array of service possesses a diverse fleet, of which includes:

=== Trolleybus ===
- Irisbus Cristalis

=== Bus ===
- Heuliez GX 117
- Irisbus Agora
- Mercedes-Benz Citaro
- Renault Agora articulated
- Citaro Facelift
- Citaro C2
- Citelis 12
- Citelis 18
- Urbanway 12
- Urbanway 18
- Heuliez GX 127
- Heuliez GX 327

=== Tramway ===
- Tramway Français Standard
- CAF Urbos 3

=== Bicycles ===
- Vélivert bike sharing program with 400 long term renting and 300 short term renting bicycles.
