= Mobi (bike share) =

Bicycle-sharing system of Vancouver, British Columbia, Canada

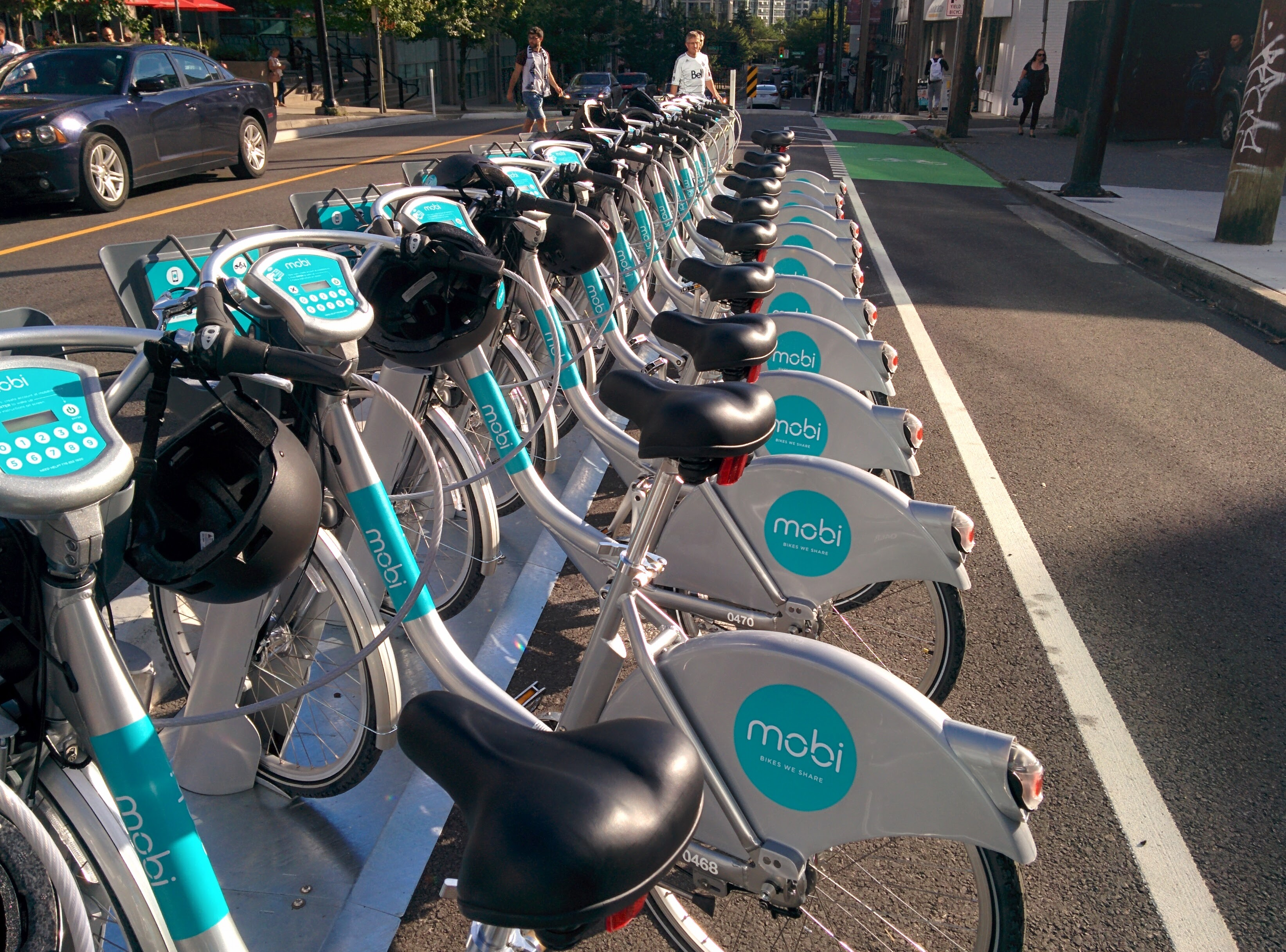
- Mobi bike share station near BC Place in downtown Vancouver

- Logo

Overview
- Locale: Vancouver, British Columbia
- Transit type: Bicycle-sharing system
- Number of stations: 200
- Website: mobibikes.ca

Operation
- Began operation: July 20, 2016; 10 years ago
- Operators: Vancouver Bike Share, Inc.; CycleHop
- Number of vehicles: 2,000

Mobi is the trade name of Vancouver Bike Share, Inc., a bicycle-sharing system in Vancouver, British Columbia, Canada. The system is administered by the city and is owned and operated by CycleHop. The system launched on July 20, 2016, with a limited number of stations and bicycles for founding members.

For sponsorship reasons, the service is also known as Mobi by Rogers and formerly as Mobi by Shaw Go.

== History ==
A public bike share system for Vancouver was first proposed in 2008 through a feasibility study by TransLink. The following year, the Vancouver City Council directed staff to begin searching for an operator, with Alta Bicycle Share selected as the preferred operator in 2011. A five-year, $6 million contract was signed by the city with Alta in July 2013, aiming for a spring 2014 launch for a system with 1,500 bicycles.

The bankruptcy of bike-share system supplier Bixi in early 2014 pushed back the launch date, and the sale of Alta Bike Share to Motivate in October prompted the city to look for a new service provider the following year. In February 2016, the City of Vancouver signed a five-year, $5 million agreement with CycleHop to operate a bike sharing system in the city by the end of the year.

A soft launch for founding members was held on July 20, 2016, with 260 bicycles and 23 stations open in downtown Vancouver and part of the Fairview neighbourhood, bounded by Arbutus Street to the west, 16th Avenue to the south, and Main Street to the east. By the end of the summer, the entire initial phase of 1,500 bicycles and 150 stations is expected to open. On December 6, 2016, Mobi announced a corporate sponsorship with Shaw Communications, a Canadian telecommunications company. The sponsorship renamed the service to "Mobi by Shaw Go" and added Shaw branding to bicycles and stations, the latter of which would also receive free Wi-Fi.

As of July 7, 2017, the system had 1,200 bikes and 122 stations. As of May 30, 2018, the system had 1,400 bikes and 143 stations. In June 2018, the coverage area was extended east to Commercial Drive. The minimum age to use Mobi was dropped to 12 years old, although the service only has adult-sized bicycles.

As of August 15, 2020, the system had 2,000 bikes and 200 stations.

Following the acquisition of the original Shaw Communications partnering company by Rogers Communications, the Vancouver's bike share network was rebranded Mobi by Rogers starting late November 2023. At the time, the fleet comprised 2,000 pedal bikes, 600 e-bikes, and 250 stations, with an expansion to the University of British Columbia Point Grey campus planned, which was to introduce 10 new stations by mid-2024. One hundred e-bikes were also planned to be added.

== Pricing ==
Mobi offers four payment options for its rental service: two annual plans of $129 and $159 for an unlimited number of 30- and 60-minute rides, respectively; a 90-day pass of $75 and a 24-hour pass of $12 for unlimited 30-minute rides. Overage fees are $6 for each additional 30-minute block on the 24-hour pass and $3 for all subsequent 30-minute blocks of additional riding on the $75 and $129 plan. A surcharge of $3 per half-hour for rides over 60 minutes are charged on the $159 plan. During the soft launch, a "founding members" discount brought the annual plans down to $99 and $129.

Corporate memberships that involve a 25% discount launched in 2017.

== Equipment ==
Mobi's fleet of 1,500 bicycles and its stations were built by Smoove, a French company that specializes in bike sharing systems. The "smart bikes" are able to be locked outside of designated stations with a lock and PIN code or digital key fob.

The system provides free helmets alongside rented bikes to comply with the province's helmet law. It, alongside Seattle's Pronto Cycle Share, are the only bicycle-sharing systems in North America that are required to provide helmets.

Bike share stations were deliberately placed at least 50 metres (160 ft) away from existing bike shops that offer competing rental services.
