= Saint-Étienne tramway =

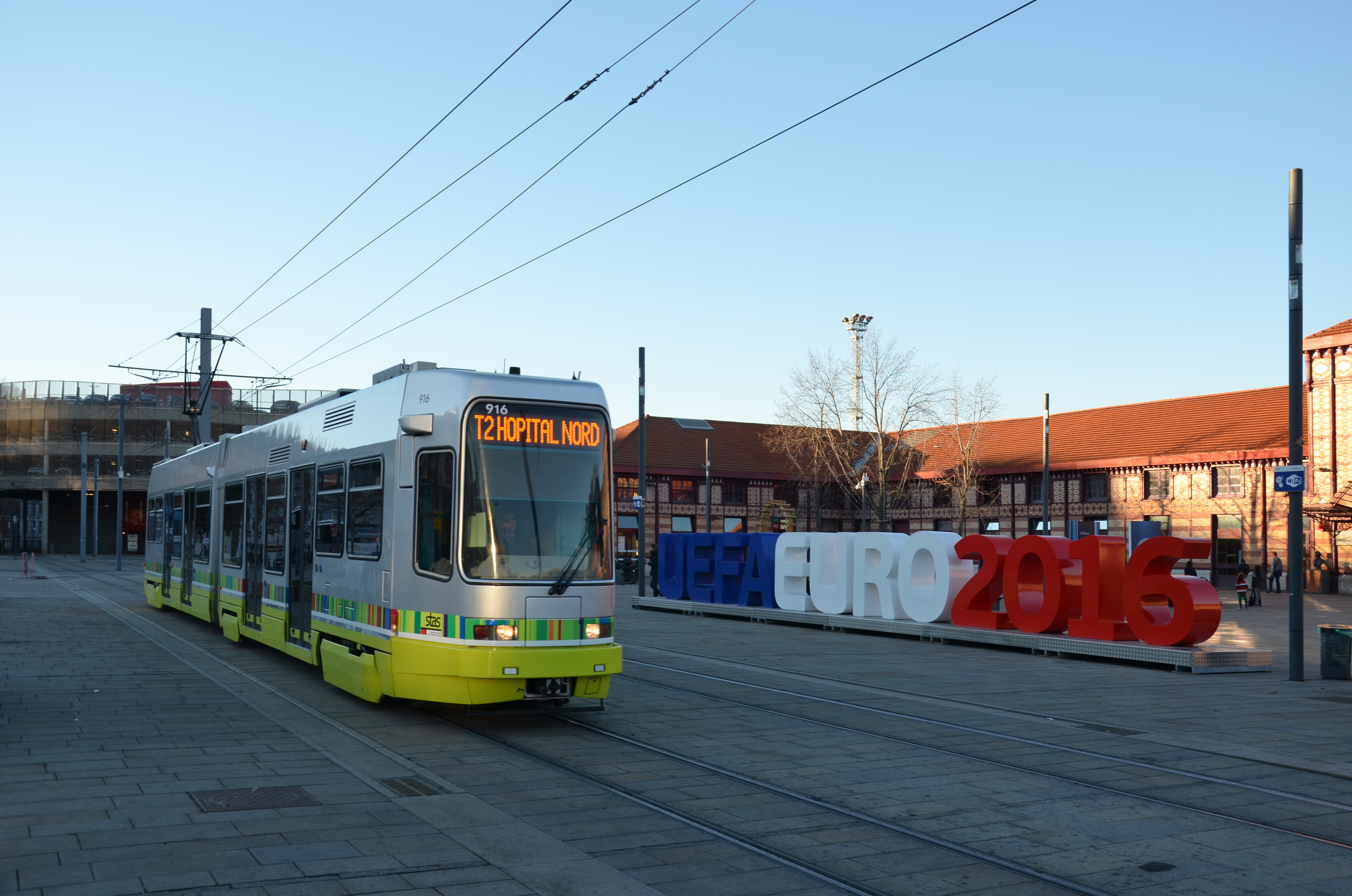
- Alsthom-Vevey tramcar at the semi terminus of Châteaucreux

Overview
- Native name: Tramway de Saint-Étienne
- Locale: Saint-Étienne, Auvergne-Rhône-Alpes, France
- Transit type: Tram
- Number of lines: 3
- Number of stations: 39
- Daily ridership: 92,000 (2012)
- Annual ridership: 20.98 million (2018)

Operation
- Began operation: 4 December 1881
- Operator: STAS

Technical
- System length: 16.3 km (10.1 mi)
- Track gauge: 1,000 mm (3 ft 3 3/8 in) metre gauge
- Electrification: 600 V DC overhead line
System map

The Saint-Étienne tramway (French: Tramway de Saint-Étienne) is a tram system in the city of Saint-Étienne in the Rhône-Alpes (France) that has functioned continuously since its opening in 1881. The first tramway line was steam-operated and was opened by the Chemins de Fer à Voie étroite de Saint-Étienne (CFVE) on 4 December 1881, stretching for 5.5 km between La Terrasse and Bellevue. The CFVE took over the Compagnie des Tramways Électriques de Saint-Étienne lines and discontinued the use of steam in 1912.

Lines with small patronage were replaced by trolleybuses in 1932 with all but one line closed in 1956 as a result of the impossibility of running these buses on the busiest line of the network. The decision to keep the tramway in the 1950s saw the introduction of the famous PCC tramcars to replace 1932 rolling stock. By the early 1980s, the system was one of just three French tram systems, along with those of Lille and Marseille, remaining in operation – until the opening of a new system in Nantes in 1985 began a tramway revival in the country. The PCC trams were replaced by low-floor Vevey-Alsthom tramcars in 1991-1992. The system is operated by the STAS.

== Network ==
The Saint-Étienne tramway now runs from Hôpital Nord to Solaure after an extension of the original line from Bellevue station to Solaure in 1983 and from La Terrasse station to Hôpital Nord in 1991, with a length of 9.3 km. The old terminals are now where some trams turn back during peak hours and others continue to Solaure and Hôpital Nord.

A line from Cinq-Chemins de Terre Noire to Saint-Jean-Bonnefonds opened in 1907 and closed on 1 April 1932 after being replaced by a bus service. Lines from the town centre to Le Pertuiset, Saint-Genest-Lerpt and Roche-la-Molière opened between 1907 and 1909. A second line to supplement the main route opened in 2006 to serve Chateaucreux station.

The first trolleybuses of the St. Etienne trolleybus system were put into service on 1 January 1942 between Raspail and Place Dorian.

== Tram carhouses ==
The current and only carhouse is on the Transpôle site near Saint-Étienne's northern hospital; until 1998 it was at Bellevue. The carhouse as well as the PCC streetcars were demolished.

The new carhouse was built south of Hôpital Nord and north of Terrasse. It is the STAS depot for Saint-Étienne and houses buses, trolleybuses and trams.

== Rolling stock ==
Saint-Étienne tramway currently runs a fleet of 35 tramcars built by Vevey and Alstom, and 16 CAF Urbos. There have been four large fleets of tramcars to operate on the network, the largest being the fleet of PCC cars introduced in 1958.

=== Type A tramcars ===
Type A tramcars were built by Grammont in 1897. The 28 cars circulated from 1897 to 1952, were 7.50 m (24 ft 7 in) long, 2 m (6 ft 7 in) wide and were capable of transporting 40 passengers.

=== Type H tramcars ===
The Type H tramcars were introduced in 1907 at the start of the electric traction services. The cars were 10.21 m (33 ft 6 in) in length, 2 m (6 ft 7 in) wide, weighed 12.3 t (empty) and developed 100 hp (2 x 5t) hp. They were operated by a wattman and a receiver (ticket collector) and could carry 48 passengers. The cars lay on a Brill 79 Ex2 truck.

=== Type R tramcars ===
Type R tramcars were built by the CGC of Saint-Denis in 1912. All eight of the cars circulated from 1912 to 1959 and were capable of carrying 47 passengers. The tramcars weighed 13 tonnes empty and were 9.35 m (30 ft 8 in) long and 2 m (6 ft 7 in) wide.

=== PCC tramcars ===
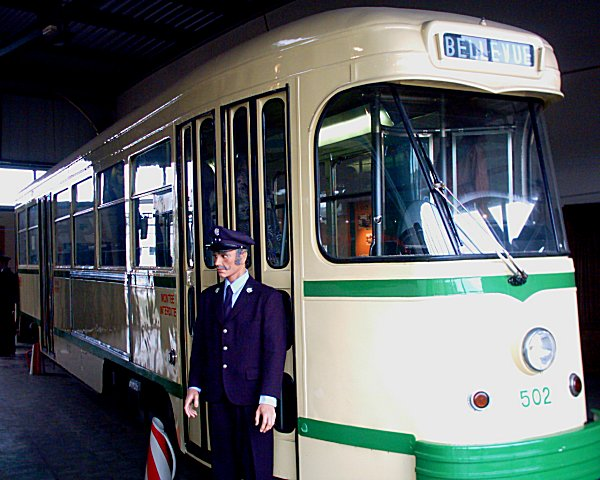
PCC streetcar

The PCC streetcar fleet was composed of 30 rigid (non-articulated) trams built in Strasbourg and five articulated trams built in Belgium by La Brugeoise et Nivelles. The two-axle cars (nos. 501–530) were introduced in 1958 after the decision to keep the busiest tram line was made. The small batch of five articulated cars (nos. 551–554) was delivered in 1968. One of those five, no. 553 (later renumbered 001, then 953), was rebodied in 1982, by Heuliez. The last PCC cars were withdrawn on 4 July 1998.

==== PCC trams in preservation ====
Société de Transports de l'Agglomération Stéphanoise still has 6 PCC streetcars:

- 5 articulated PCC streetcars, numbered 551 to 555, awaiting a buyer;
- 1 PCC streetcar, number 506, used for maintenance (unusual for having been retrofitted with a pantograph in addition to its trolley pole).

=== Alsthom-Vevey-Duewag articulated tramcars ===
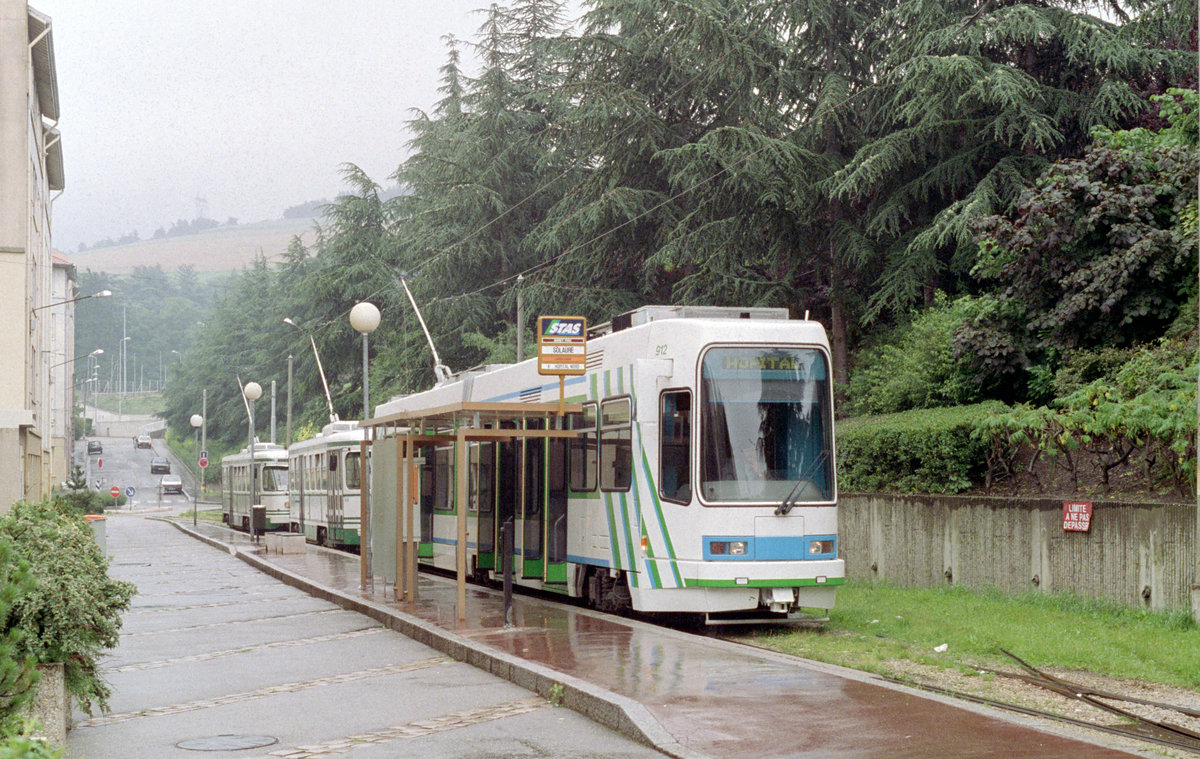
1992-built French Standard Tram 912, in its original livery, with two PCC trams behind, at Solaure in 1992

This class of tramcars, a variation of the Tramway Français Standard, exists in two types, tramcars introduced in 1991 and those in 1998. The first class was introduced between 1991 and 1992 at the time of the line extension to Hôpital Nord. They are numbered 901 to 915 and have a seating capacity of 43. In 1998, more tramcars were introduced with only minor differences, numbered 916 to 935.

The first class of modern tramcars (15), delivered in 1991–1992, was originally equipped with trolley poles, since the PCC trams were still in use. In 1998, these were replaced by pantographs as the PCC trams were withdrawn and the second group of modern cars was introduced.

The second class of Alsthom-Vevey tramcars (20) are capable of reaching a maximum speed of 70 km/h. They were built on 23.24 m (76 ft 3 in) long H chassis and have an empty weight of 27.4 tonnes. Delivered beginning in spring 1998, 10 of the 20 cars entered service in time for the 1998 FIFA World Cup matches in June, and initially also used trolley pole current collection like the older trams, as the overhead wiring had not yet been modified for pantographs. However, the other 10 were due to be delivered with pantographs, and the earlier 10 of this series due to be converted to pantographs after mid-July 1998. The current delivered is 600 V DC.

After a formal farewell excursion for the PCC trams on 11 July (one week after their last use in service), all service on the system was temporarily suspended for a few weeks to permit the overhead wiring to be modified for pantographs. The system reopened on 24 August 1998, with the entire active fleet now equipped with pantographs. Saint-Étienne's was the last tram system in France to use trolley pole current collection.

=== CAF Urbos ===
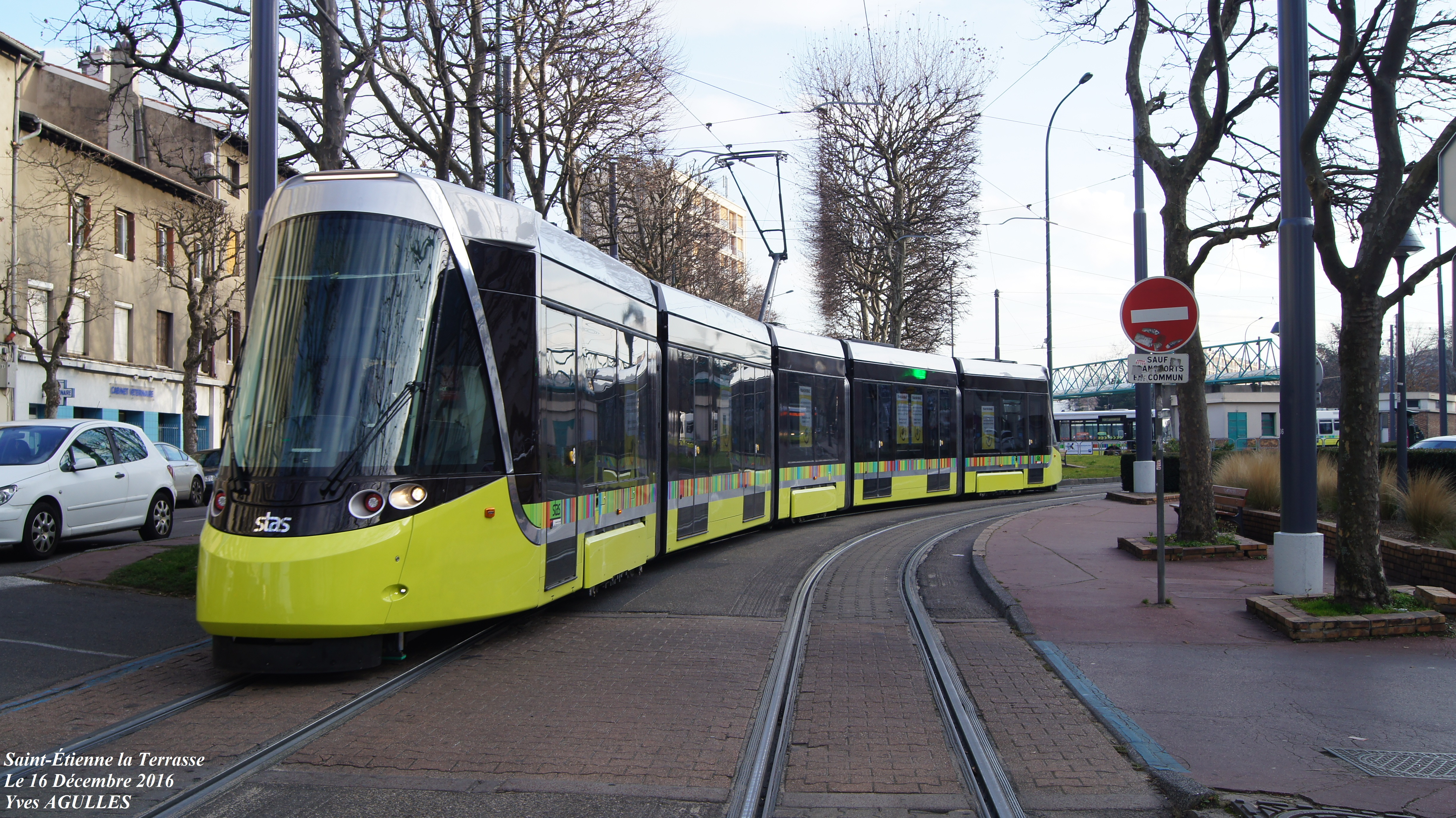
CAF Urbos tram in December 2016

In order to replace and expand the fleet, in 2014 a €42m contract was signed with CAF for delivery of 16 Urbos trams. These were delivered between 2017 and 2018.

== See also ==
- Trams in France
- List of town tramway systems in France
