= CycleHop =

Bicycle sharing company

CycleHop LLC
- Company type: Private
- Founded: November 1, 2011; 13 years ago in Miami Beach, Florida
- Founder: Josh Squire
- Headquarters: Miami Beach, Florida, United States
- Website: cyclehop.com

CycleHop LLC is a bicycle sharing platform and mobility company that operates bike share systems in fifteen cities in North America, including Vancouver Bike Share in British Columbia.

== History ==
The company's founder traces its history back to 1997 and the company's first patent for an "unattended automated bicycle rental station."

In April 2014, the company bought Capital Bixi company in Canada and in October re-launched the service under VeloGo brand in Ottawa. In 2016, it launched bike-sharing service Mobi in Vancouver, sponsored by Shaw Communications. However, in June 2019, the company announced that was pulling out from Ottawa.

As of January 2015, the firm operated bike-sharing systems in seven cities.

In March 2018, the firm launched HOPR (pronounced like “hopper”), a mobile app that allows to search for public transport, car share and bike share options. As of 2018, it was running bike-sharing systems in 15 cities in the USA and Canada.

The company had planned to move its headquarters from Miami Beach to Santa Monica in 2015, but remained headquartered in Florida as of 2019.

In 2021, CycleHop launched its flagship ride-share program in Rochester under its contract with Rochester Transit Service. The program received a $240,000 grant to add 8 stations to low income neighborhoods in Monroe County. The stations, at which users could find traditional bicycles, electric bikes, and scooters, were developed through a partnership with Emergnt Design Labs and manufactured in Rochester.
