= Capital Bixi =

Bicycle sharing system in Canada

Overview
- Owner: Public Bike System Company
- Locale: Ottawa, Ontario & Gatineau, Quebec (National Capital Region)
- Transit type: Bicycle sharing system
- Number of stations: 25 (2012)
- Annual ridership: 44,335 (2011)
- Website: https://capital.bixi.com

Operation
- Began operation: 2009
- Number of vehicles: 250 (2012)

Capital Bixi was a public bicycle sharing system serving Ottawa, Ontario and Gatineau, Quebec, Canada. Launched in June 2009, it was the second BIXI system worldwide after BIXI Montréal. Capital Bixi was run by the National Capital Commission, which sold the bike share program to CycleHop.

== History ==
From June to September 2009, the system was introduced in a pilot study with 100 bicycles at 10 stations. In 2012 Capital Bixi and its sponsors the National Capital Commission (NCC), the City of Ottawa, the City of Gatineau, the Canadian Museum of Nature, Environment Canada, and Telus, expanded the bike share system, covered more ground, and offered 15 new stations and 150 new bikes, for a total of 25 stations and 250 bikes.

In January 2014, the parent company of BIXI, Public Bike System Company, filed for bankruptcy protection, however, the NCC anticipated that the bike share service would return that year nonetheless. In April 2014, the NCC announced that CycleHop would take over the bike share system in the city.

== Cost ==
There were several different payment options with Capital Bixi. Customers could either become members or pay per use.

Subscription	Cost	Trip included	Additional costs
24 hours	$7.00	Unlimited trips. First 30 minutes free per trip	$1.25 for 31-60 minute rides, $3.50 for 61-90 minute rides
72 hours	$15.00	Unlimited trips. First 30 minutes free per trip	$1.25 for 31-60 minute rides, $3.50 for 61-90 minute rides
30 days	$30.25	Unlimited trips. First 45 minutes free per trip	$1.75 for 46-60 minute rides, $3.50 for 61-90 minute rides
1 year	$80.50	Unlimited trips. First 45 minutes free per trip	$1.75 for 46-60 minute rides, $3.50 for 61-90 minute rides

== The bikes ==
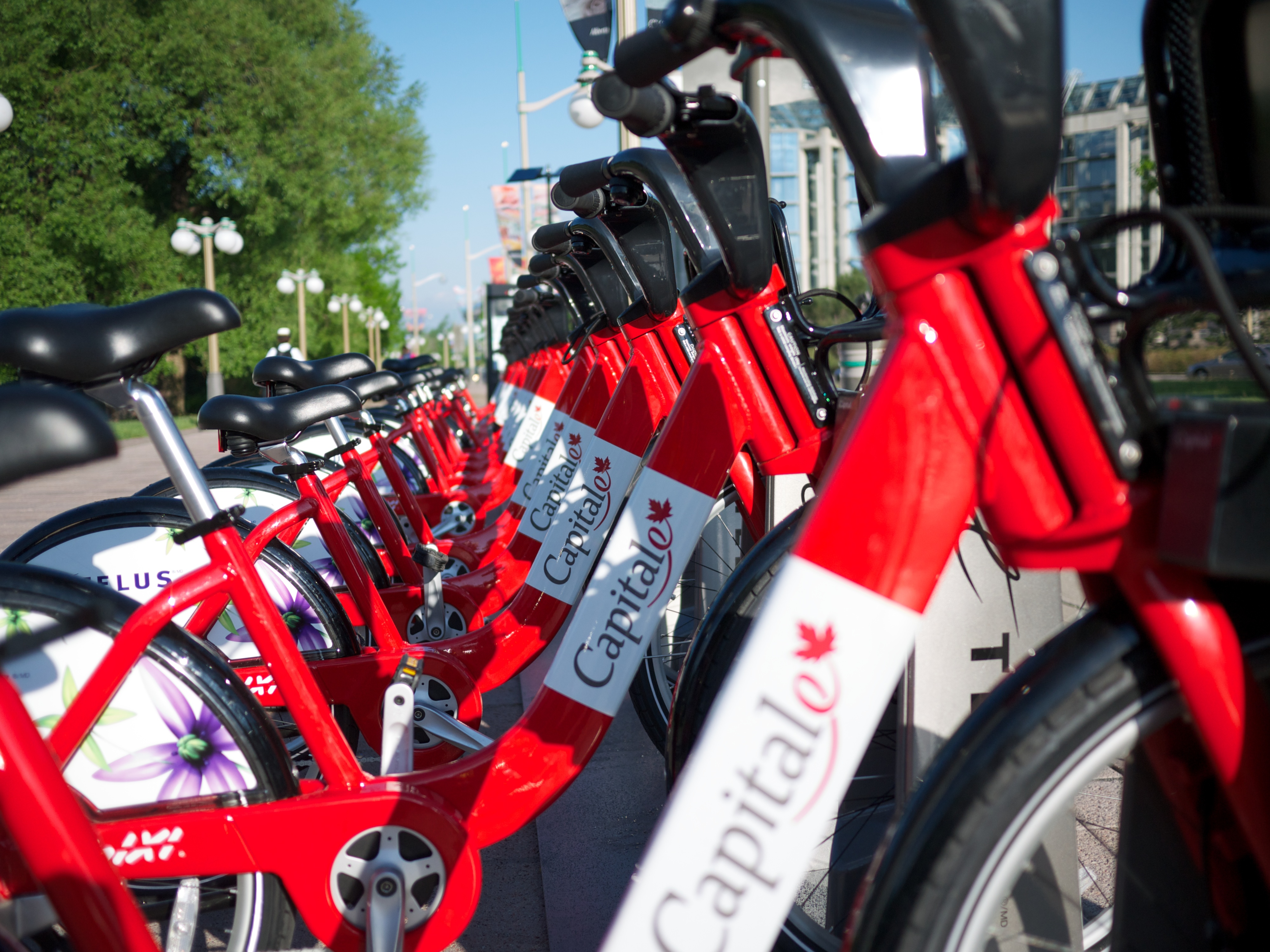
Capital Bixi Station

The bicycles are utility bicycles with a unisex step-through frame.

The one-piece aluminum frame and handlebars conceal cables in an effort to protect them from vandalism and inclement weather. The heavy-duty tires are designed to be puncture-resistant and are filled with nitrogen to maintain proper inflation pressure longer. Twin LED rear lights are integrated into the frame, and the robust frame weighs approximately 18 kg. The bikes are designed by industrial designer Michel Dallaire and built in the Saguenay, Quebec region by Cycles Devinci, with aluminum provided by Rio Tinto Alcan.
