= Transport in Montpellier =

Montpellier is a city in Hérault, France. The city is located 750 kilometres (470 mi) south of Paris, on the Mediterranean Sea. The city has a population of 255,080 and is the 8th largest city in France.

== Urban transport ==
Since December 21, 2023, the public transport is free for all residents. Previously, all residents under 18 and over 65 years of age had been transported free of charge since September 1, 2021.

=== Bus ===
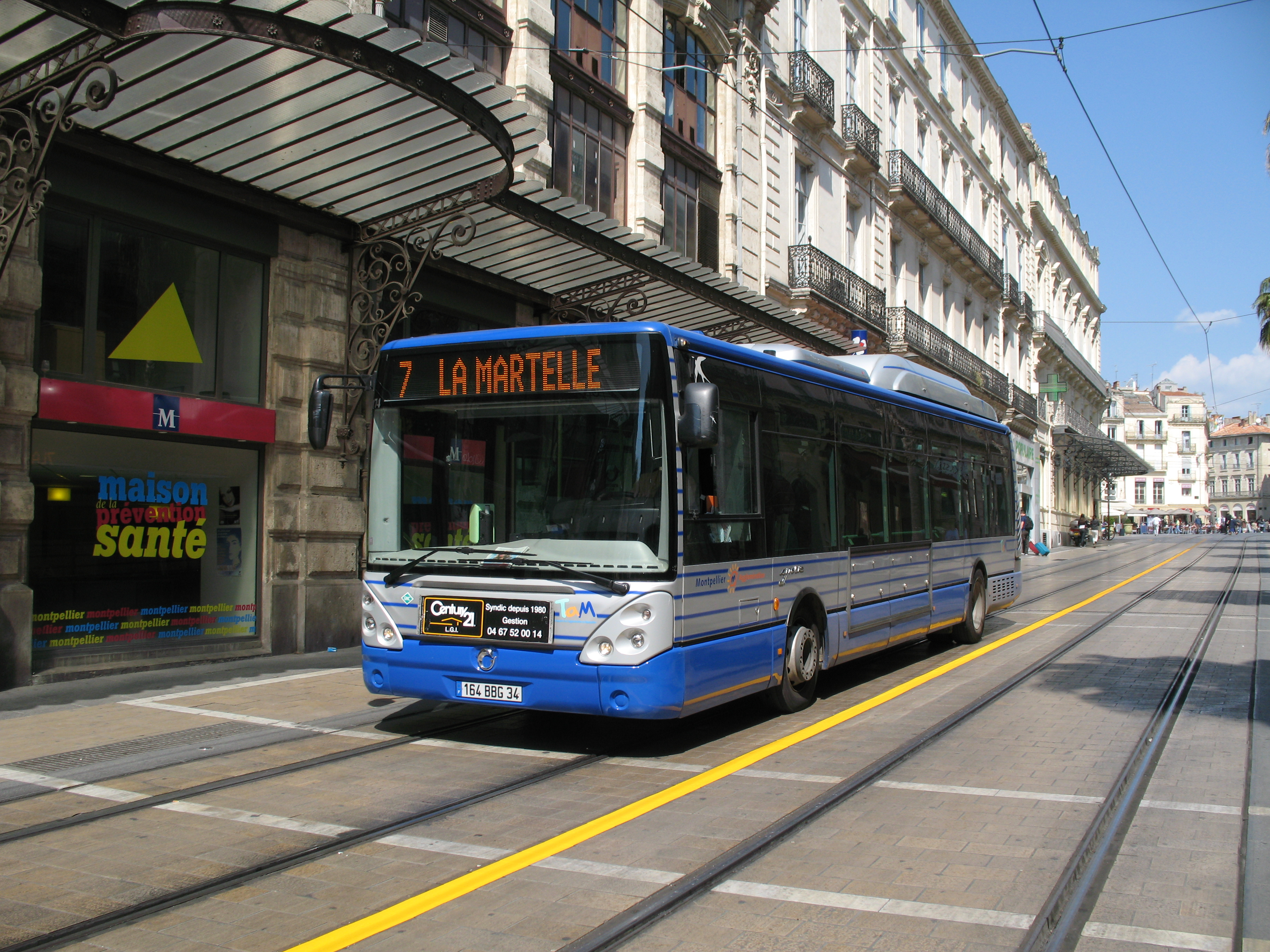
A TaM Montpellier Bus

Bus services are operated by TaM.

=== Tram ===
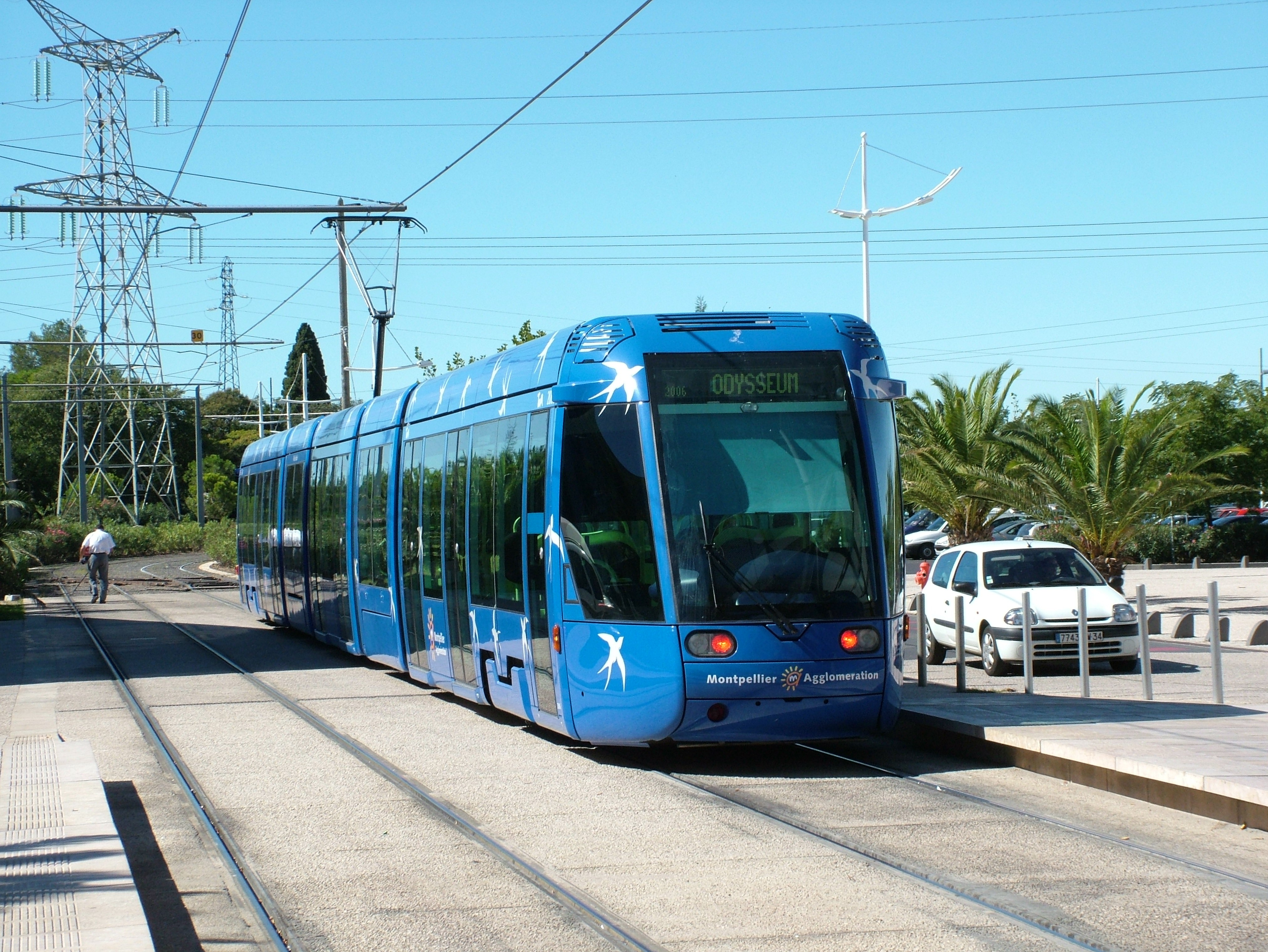
A tram on Line 1

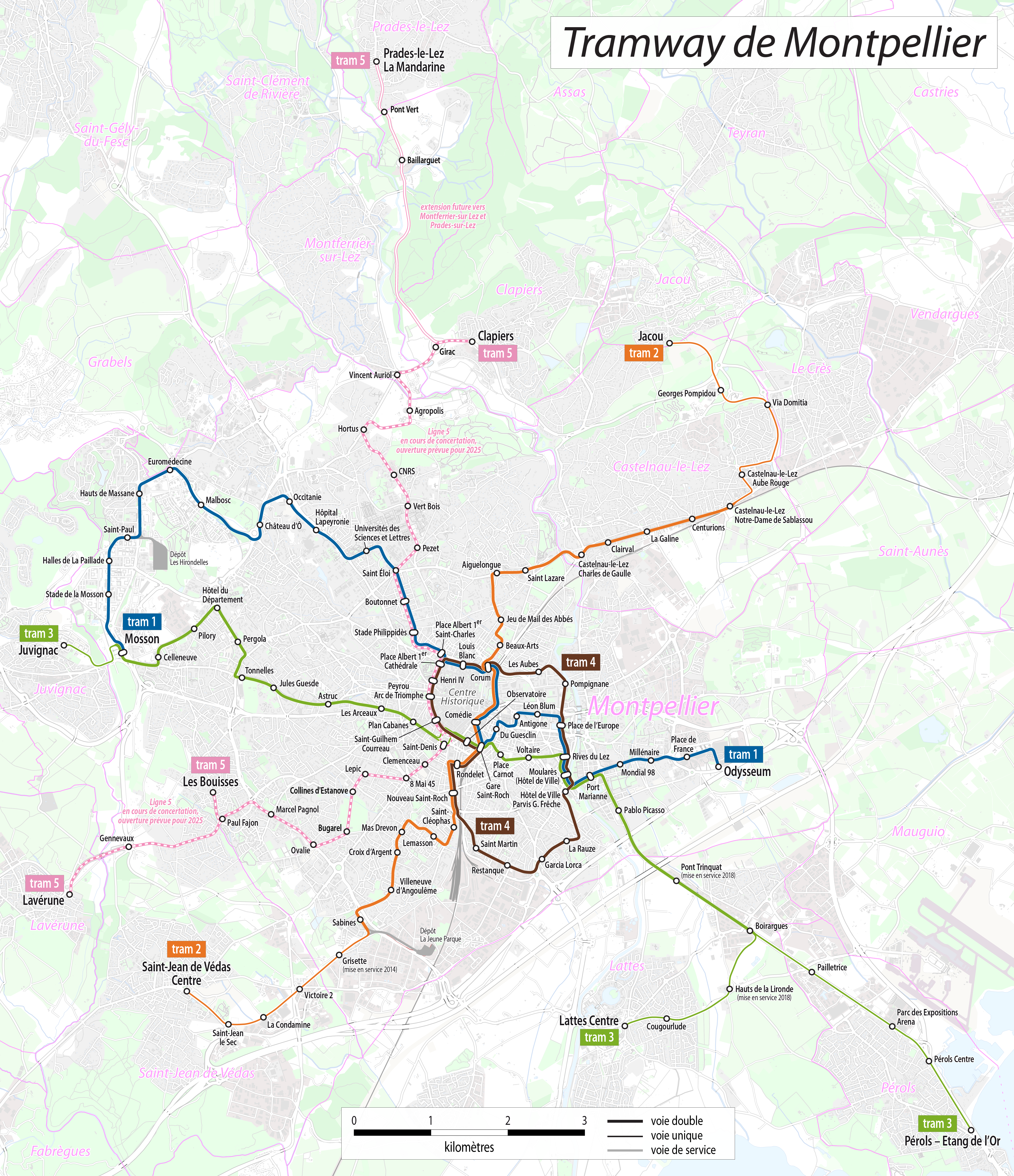
Trams network of Montpellier

Montpellier has 4 tram routes, serving large parts of the city. The first line opened in 2000 and there is now a network of 63 km (2012). All 4 routes serve Montpellier-Saint-Roch railway station.

- 1 (Mosson - Hospital Lapeyronie - University - City Centre - Odysseum)
- 2 (Saint-Jean de Vedas - Villeneuve d'Angoulême - City Centre - Castelnau-le-Lez - Jacou)
- 3 (Juvignac - Mosson - City Centre - Boirargues - Lattes / Perols-Etang de l'Or)
- 4 (City Centre Service: Place Albert 1er - Saint-Denis)

=== Cycling ===
Vélomagg's logo.

Vélomagg' (from Vélos Montpellier Agglomeration) is a bike sharing scheme in Montpellier launched in June 2007, engineered by Smoove. This community bicycle program has 750 bicycles and 59 stations for short and long term renting, optionally coupled with tramway, bus and car sharing services. Individual bicycles can park in secured parking lots linked to the system, equipped with electrical public pumps. The bicycles are secured by electronic locks operated by RFID client smart card or keyboard. The system is reliable and appreciated, the bicycles are relatively cheap, sturdy and light.

Contrary to most other such programs, it is not linked to an advertising deal.

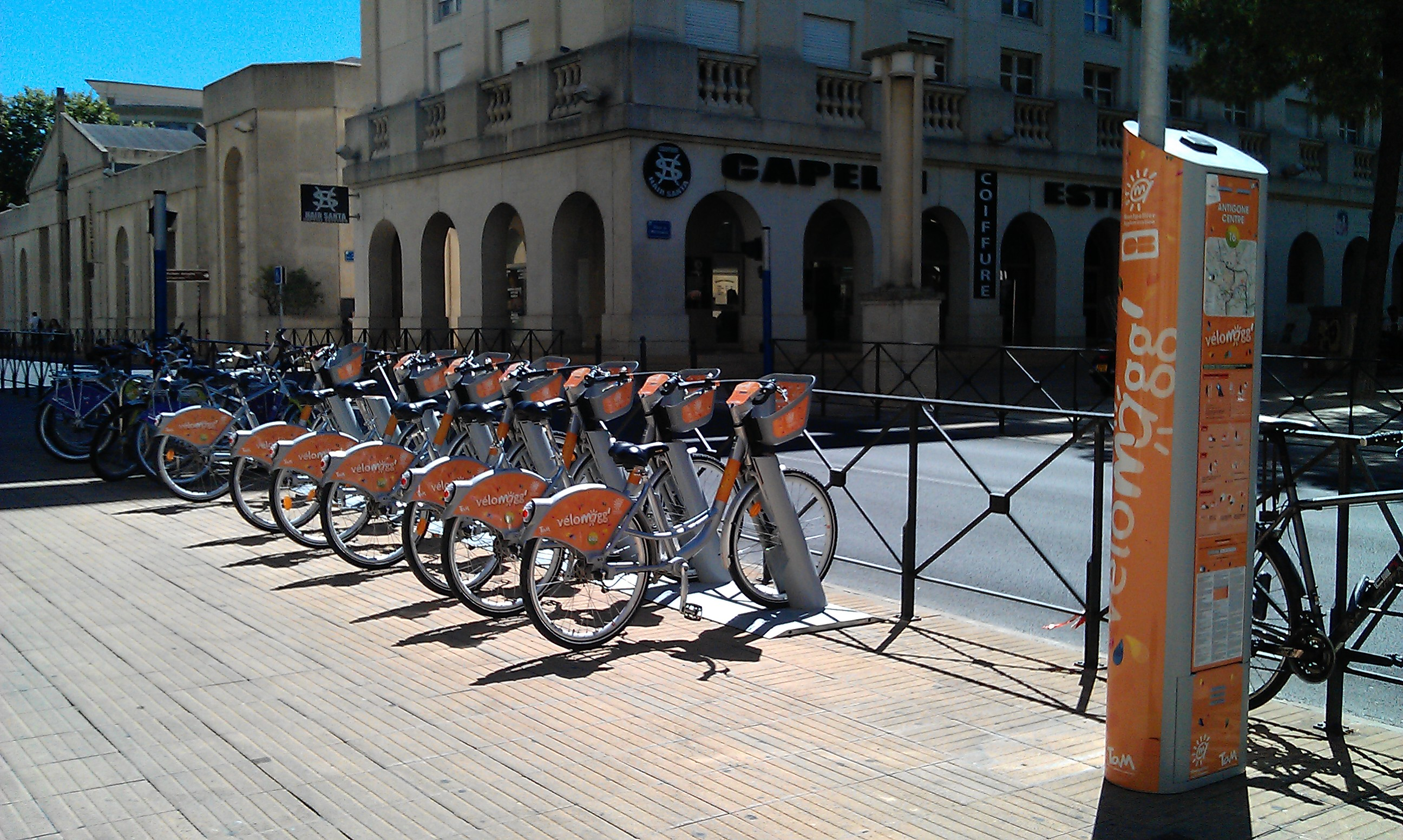
Now in Orange

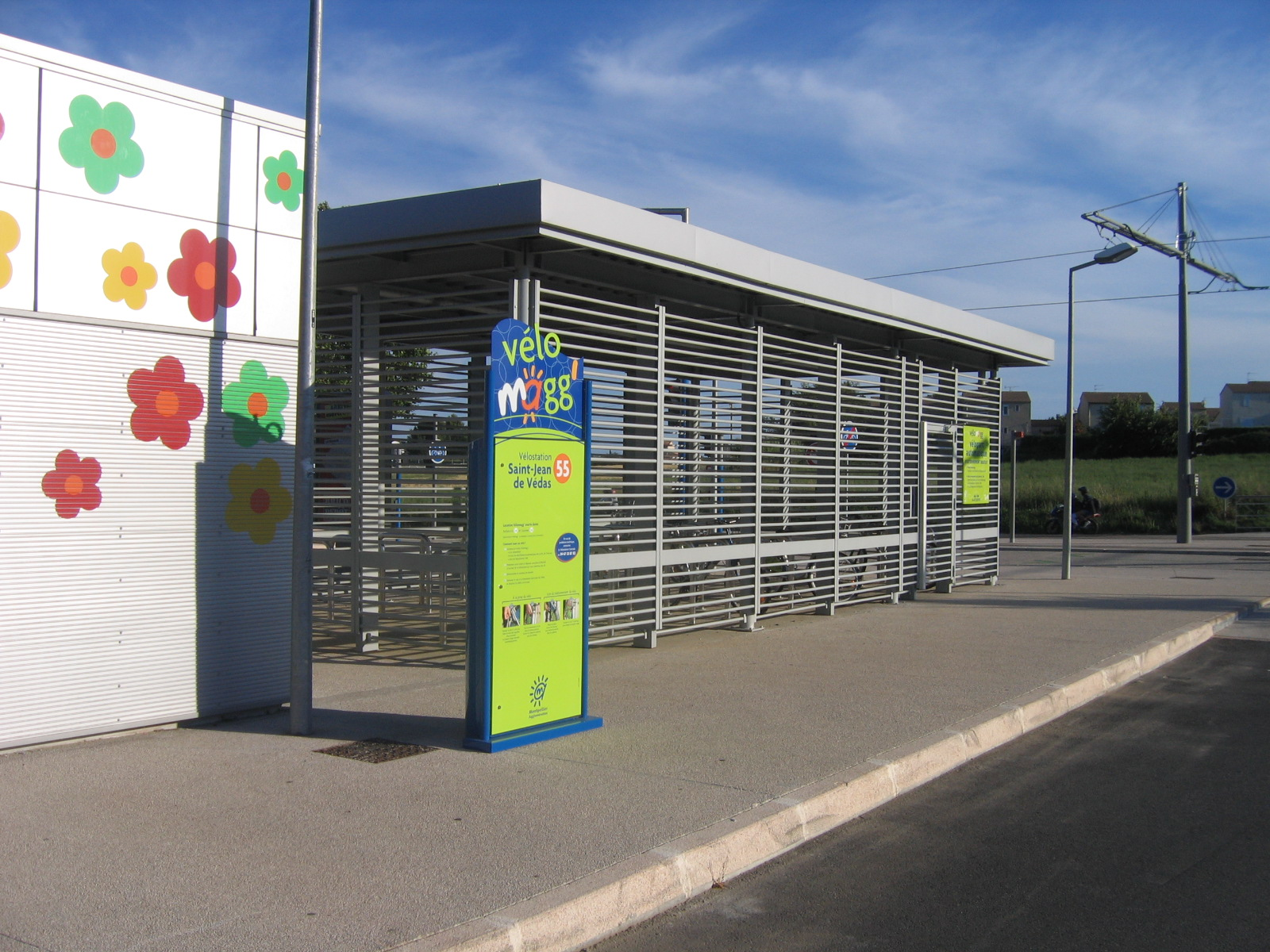
Secured bicycle parks

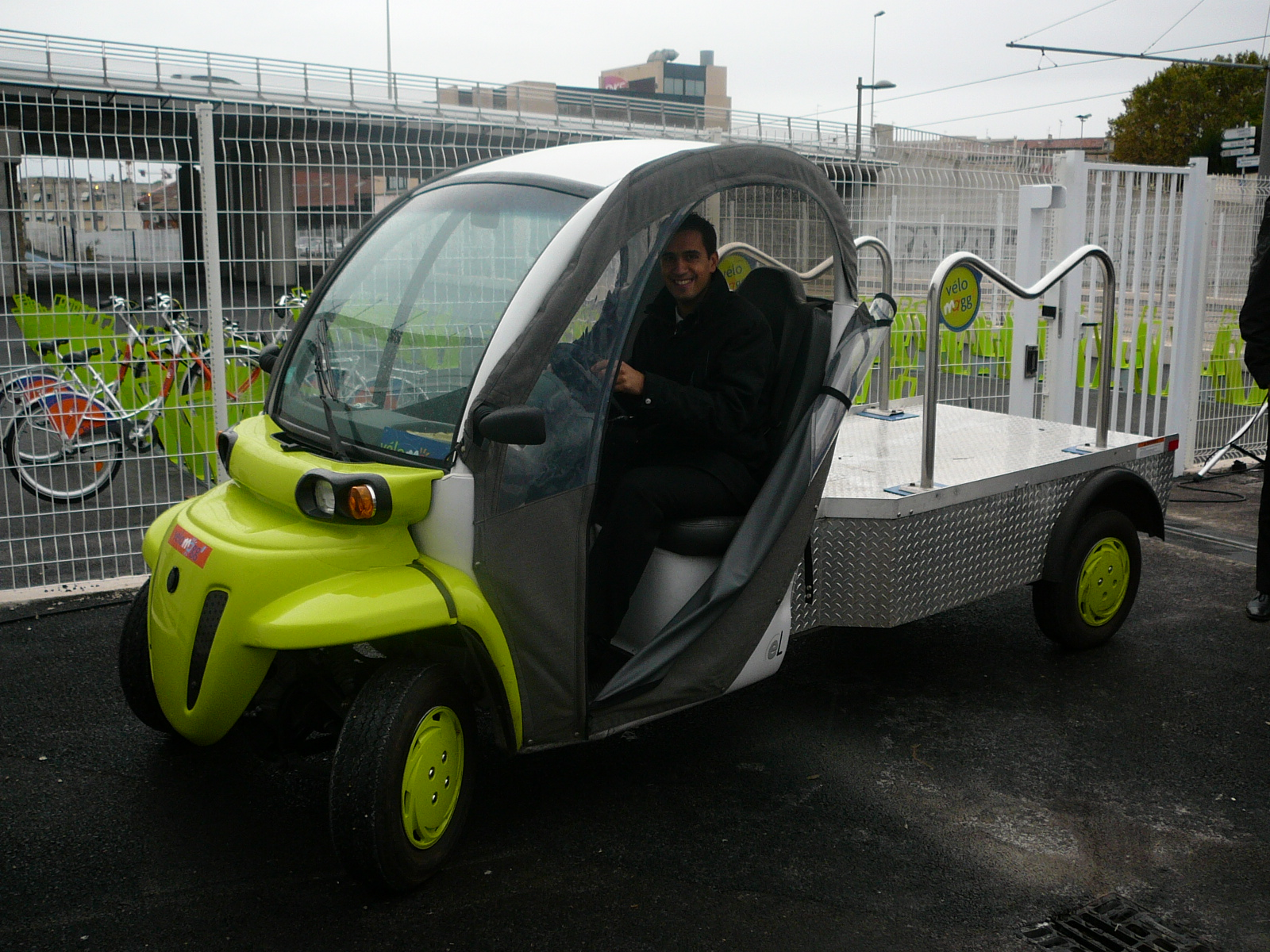
Bicycles are redispatched by electric vans

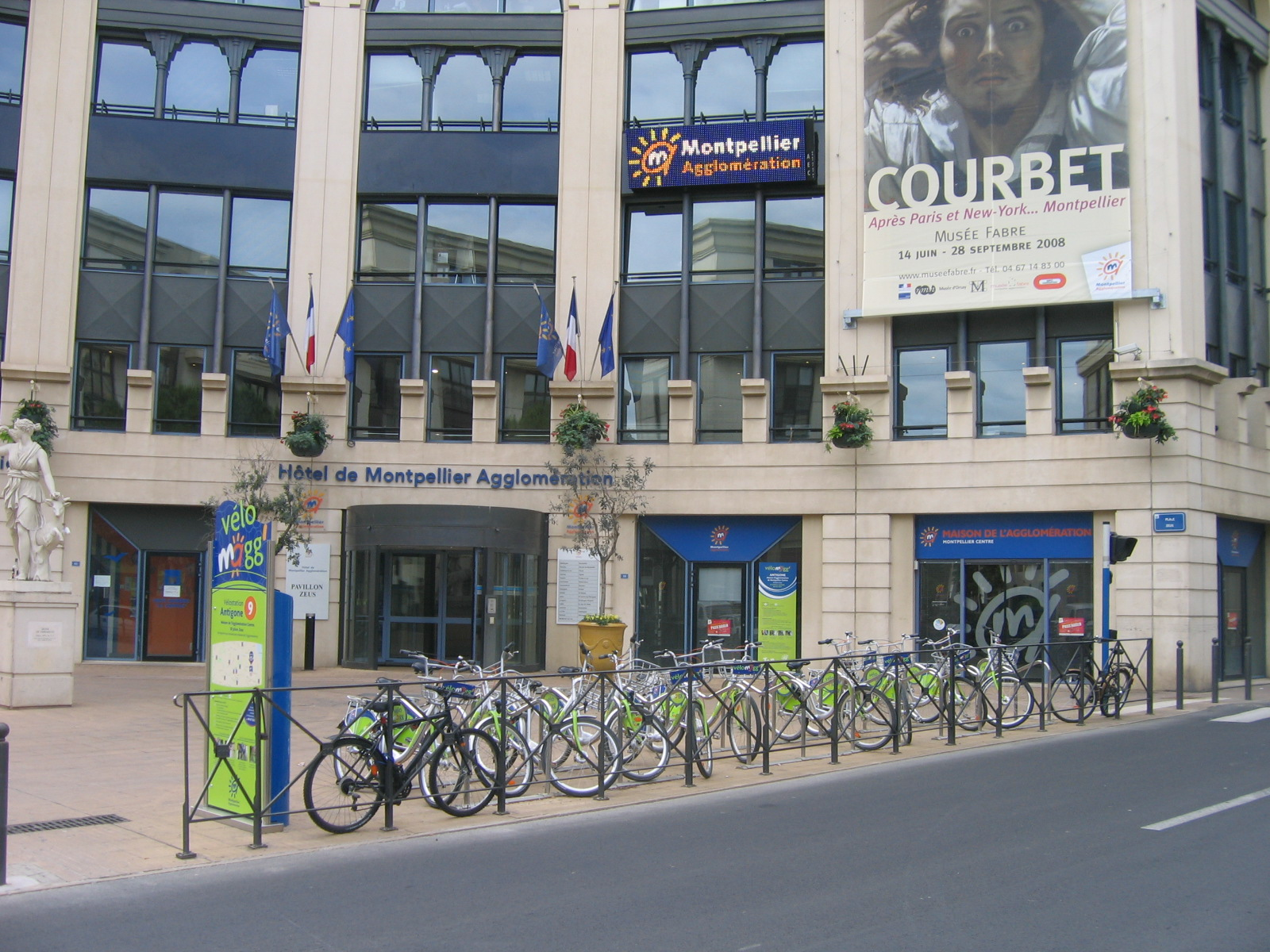
A Vélomagg' station

== Longer distance transport ==
=== Car ===
Montpellier lies on the A9 Motorway (Orange - Spanish Border - Barcelona). Lyon, Paris, Clermont-Ferrand, Marseille, Nice, Toulouse and Bordeaux are all accessible by Motorway from Montpellier.

=== Rail ===
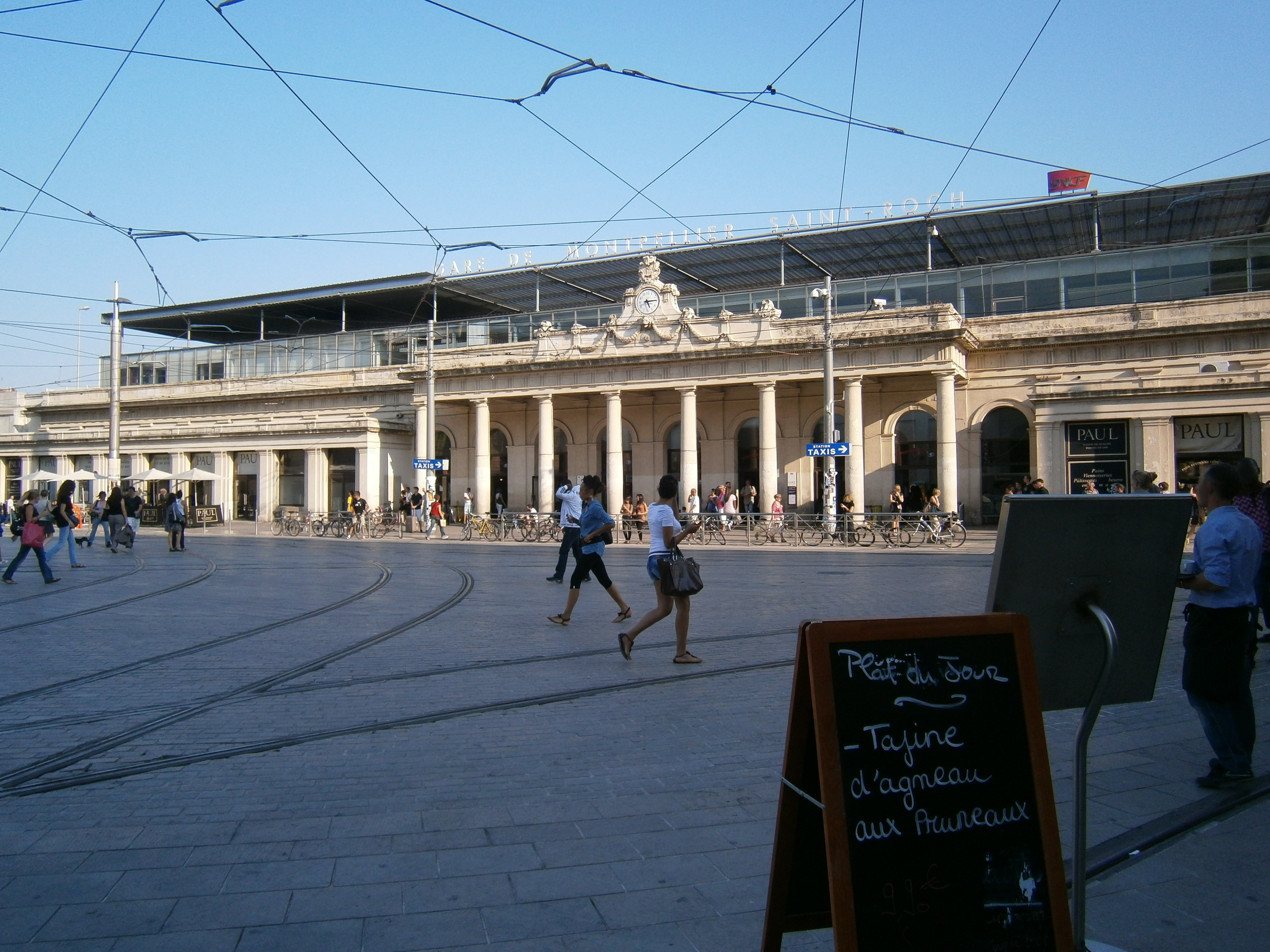
Montpellier-Saint-Roch station

Montpellier-Saint-Roch railway station is the main station, located in the city centre. The station is served by trains to major cities such as Paris, Angers, Avignon, Béziers, Bordeaux, Dijon, Le Mans, Lille, Lyon, Marseille, Nantes, Narbonne, Nice, Nîmes, Perpignan, Rennes and Toulouse. International services operate to Barcelona and Madrid in Spain and Brussels in Belgium.

There are plans to construct a high-speed railway linking Nîmes and Montpellier with the LGV Méditerranée.

Train services are operated by SNCF.

=== Air ===
Montpellier – Méditerranée Airport is located 7 kilometres (4.3 mi) south-east of the city, in the area of Fréjorgues. Marseille Provence Airport is 150 kilometres (93 mi) away, which offers more international flights. Lyon-Saint Exupéry Airport and Paris-Charles de Gaulle Airport can both be reached by public transport from Montpellier. Paris-CDG airport has a number of direct TGV train services from Montpellier.
