= Fifteen (company) =

French bicycle sharing company

- Formerly: Smoove
- Company type: Société par actions simplifiée
- Industry: Urban transport
- Founded: July 15, 2008; 17 years ago
- Founder: Laurent Mercat
- Headquarters: Montpellier, France
- Key people: Laurent Mercat (CEO)
- Products: Bicycle sharing systems
- Website: fifteen.eu

Smoove logo (2008–2022)

Fifteen (previously Smoove) is a French company that designs, manufactures and markets products related to bike-sharing. The company produces lightweight bike stands that require virtually no civil engineering and no electricity.

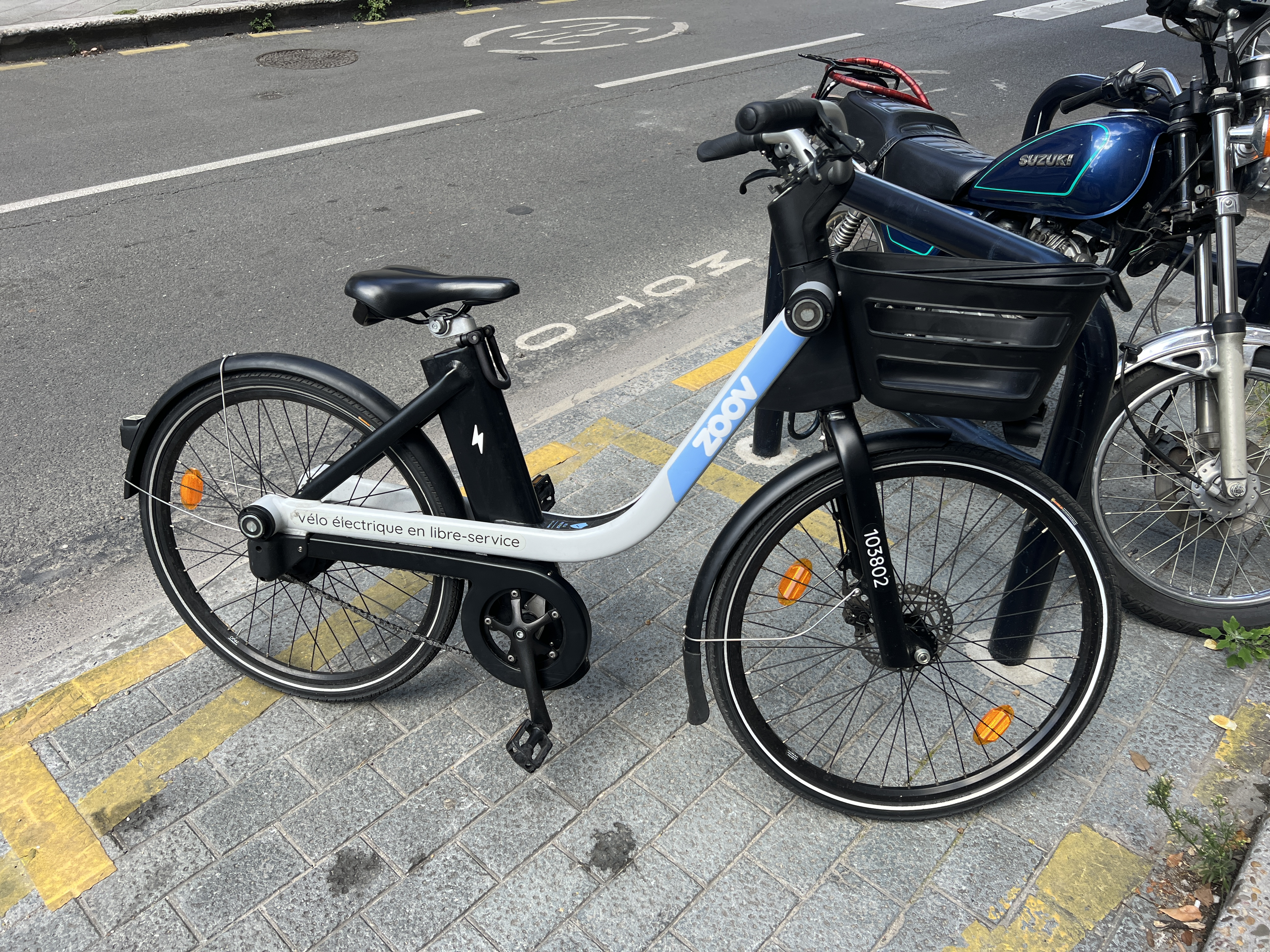
A Zoov electric bike in Bordeaux, 2022

In 2022, the company changed its name from Smoove to Fifteen, after merging with Zoov.

== Bike stands ==
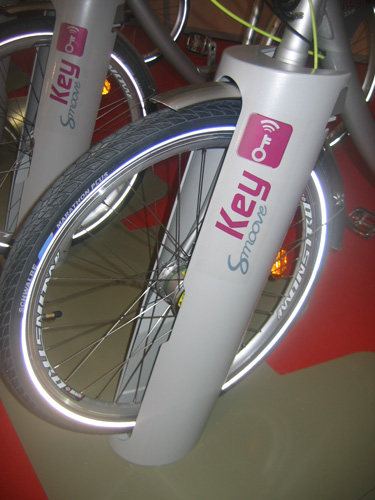
The Bike Stand

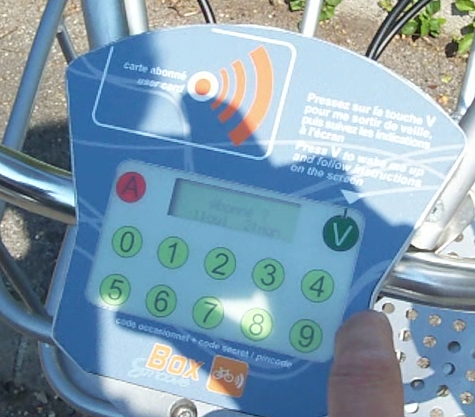
RFID/Keyboard electronic lock

The lock that is on the bicycle, situated in the fork. It secures the bike in the stations and outside the stations with an auto-winding cable. The system won some recognition by mayors and in the industry for it reliability, its moderate price and the fact that it is not linked to an advertising deal.

The lock can be either mechanical or electronic. The mechanical lock is based on the distribution of an RFID-tagged key from a pillar box dispenser. The electronic lock relies on an RFID reader on the bicycle, together with a keyboard for casual users. A long-term member will simply flash the member card on the bike to unlock it while the casual user will purchase a code, by internet, SMS, at a counter, or from a credit-card pillar dispenser. One idea is to share costs of payment methods and of street furniture with other existing systems such as car park ticket machines or public transport ticket systems, which can host the radio relay server.

== Smoove bike ==
The salient part of the bike is the Fork Lock which can be adapted to different types of bicycles, including motorized bicycle. A cheap, light and sturdy bicycle is proposed, meant to reduce servicing and vandalism:

- self-winding lock cable, it winds itself in the frame;
- powerful and low energy LED lights, included in the frame;
- transmission gear by Cardan joint;
- secured punctureless tyres;
- rear hub gear and front hub dynamo;
- mud-guards, skirt-guard, front basket, with easily changeable promotional fabric;
- compatible with motorized bicycle.

== Other products ==
Public foot-pumps, secured bike parks whether collective large shelters with access code or mono bike carousels. In a town equipped with the Smoove Box electronic key system, an RFID-radiotag bike-theft monitoring system can be provided for individuals, users can locate their bike whenever it is within 50m around a station or a mobile reader. A "Smoove Soft" web access software helps manage the whole system, from the user and administrative perspective.

== Systems installed by Fifteen (previously Smoove) ==
- Annemasse, France;
- Astana Bike (Astana, Kazakhstan);
- Almaty Bike (Almaty, Kazakhstan);
- BatumVelo (Batumi, Georgia);
- Bike in Action (Nicosia, Cyprus);
- Bike and Roll (Chicago, United States);
- Cycle Hire Slough (Slough, United Kingdom);
- C.Vélo (Clermont-Ferrand, France);
- CU Bike, Chulalongkorn University (Bangkok, Thailand);
- Helsinki City Bikes (Helsinki, Finland);
- Libélo (Valence, France);
- Medina bikes (Marrakesh, Morocco);
- Mobi (Vancouver, Canada);
- Optymo (Territoire de Belfort, France);
- Réflex (Chalon sur Saône, France);
- Shymkent Bike (Shymkent, Kazakhstan);
- Vantaa City Bikes (Vantaa, Finland);
- Vélib' (Paris, France);
- Velobike (Moscow, Russia, 2014–2025). In 2025, all Smoove bicycles operated by Velobike were decommissioned;
- Vélomagg' (Montpellier, France);
- Vélopop' (Avignon, France);
- Vél'hop (Strasbourg, France)
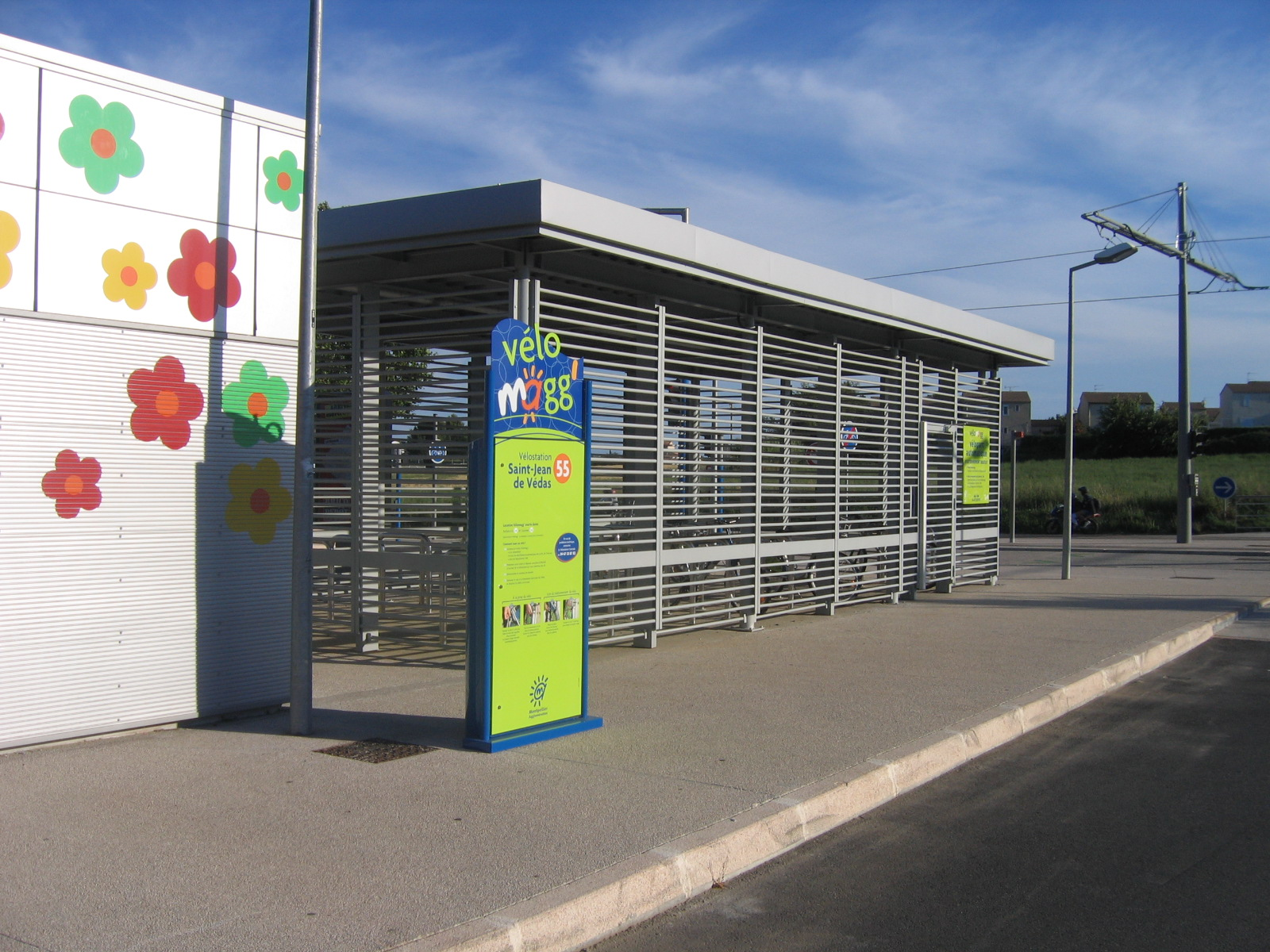
Secured bicycle parking of Vélomagg' in Montpellier

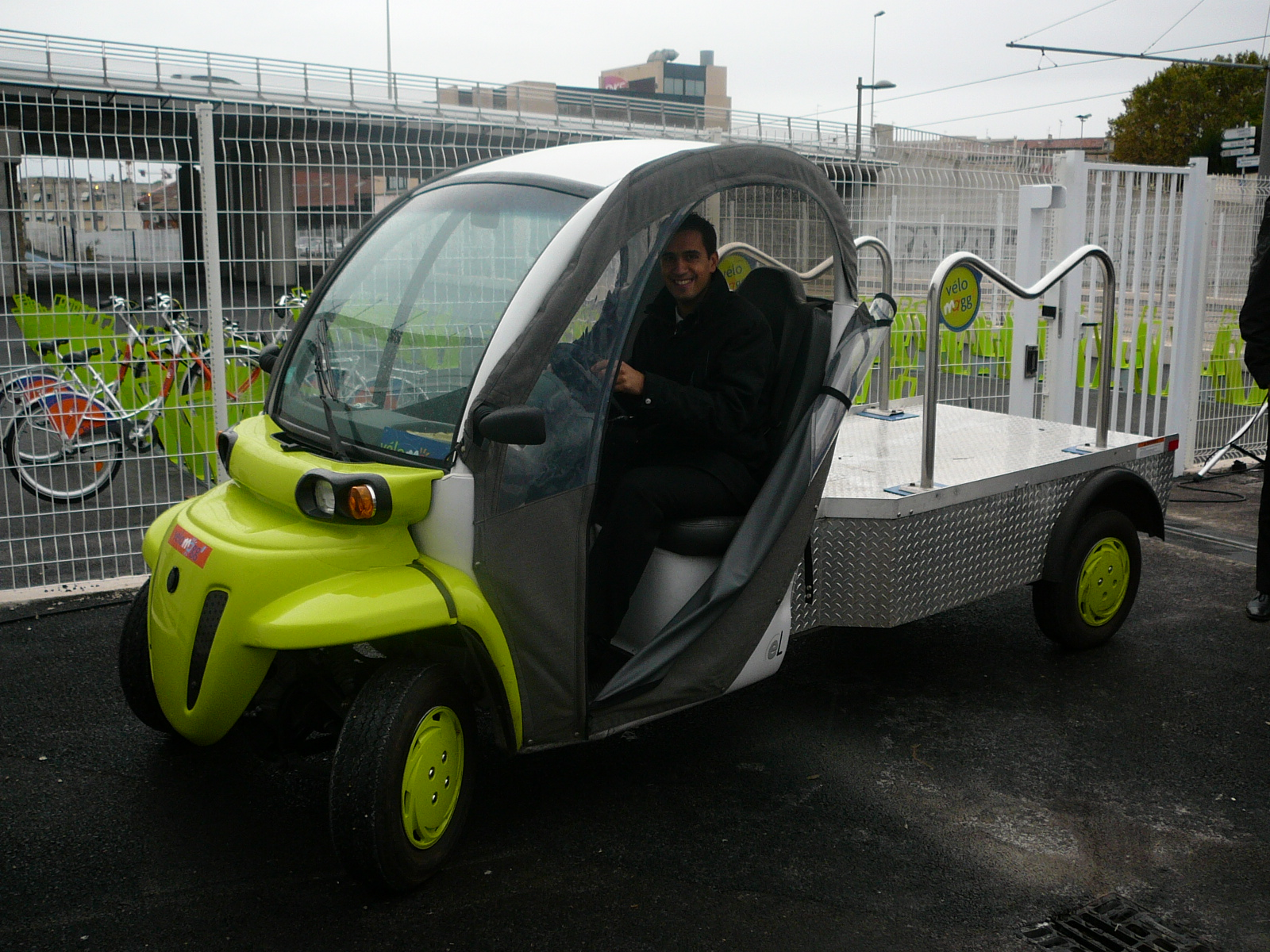
Bicycles of Vélomagg' in Montpellier are redispatched by a fleet of electric vans.

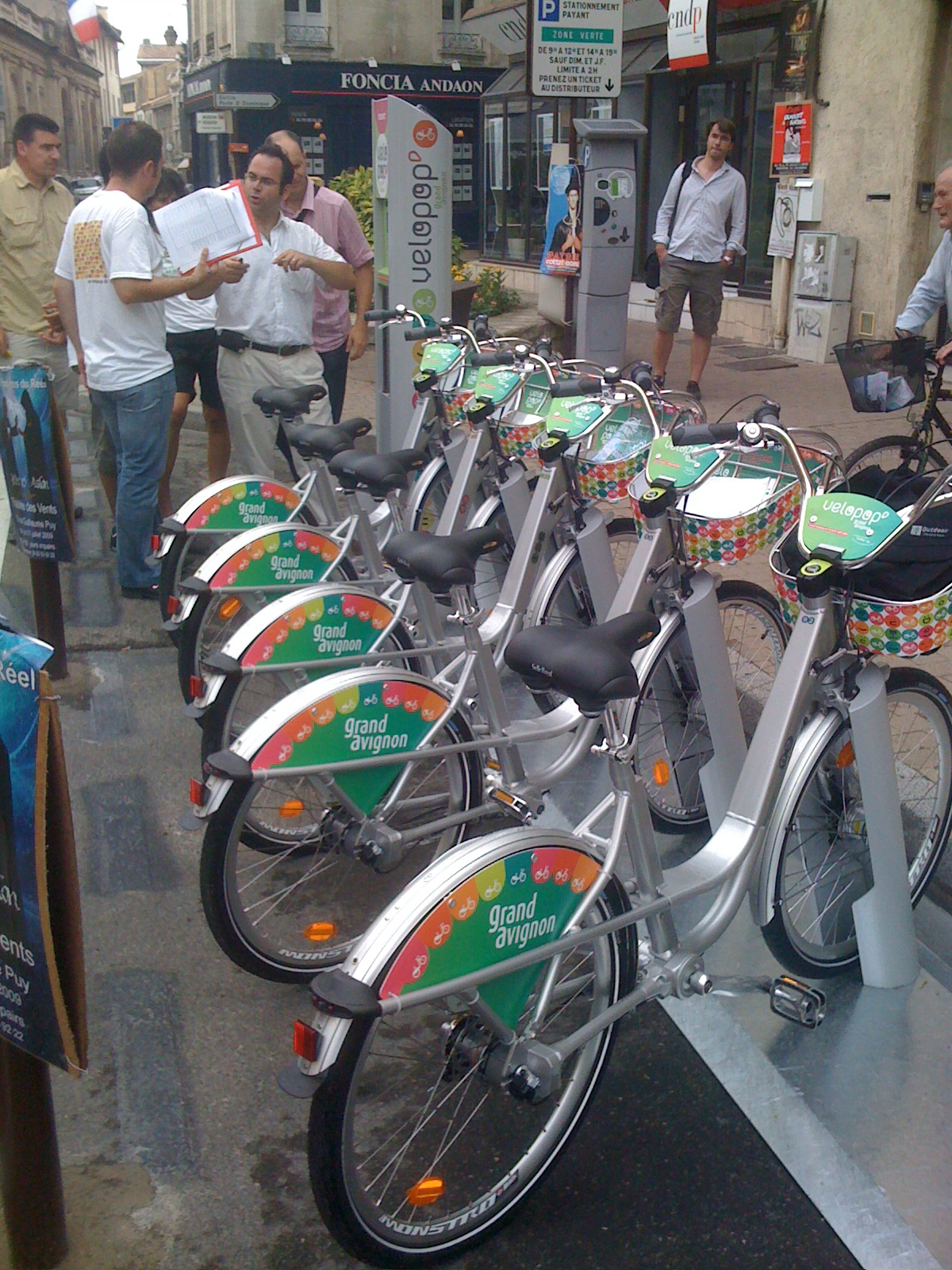
Vélopop' in Avignon

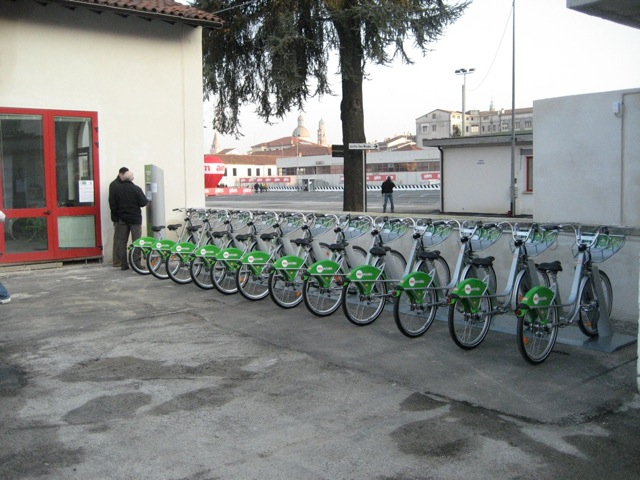
A station in Vicenza, Italy

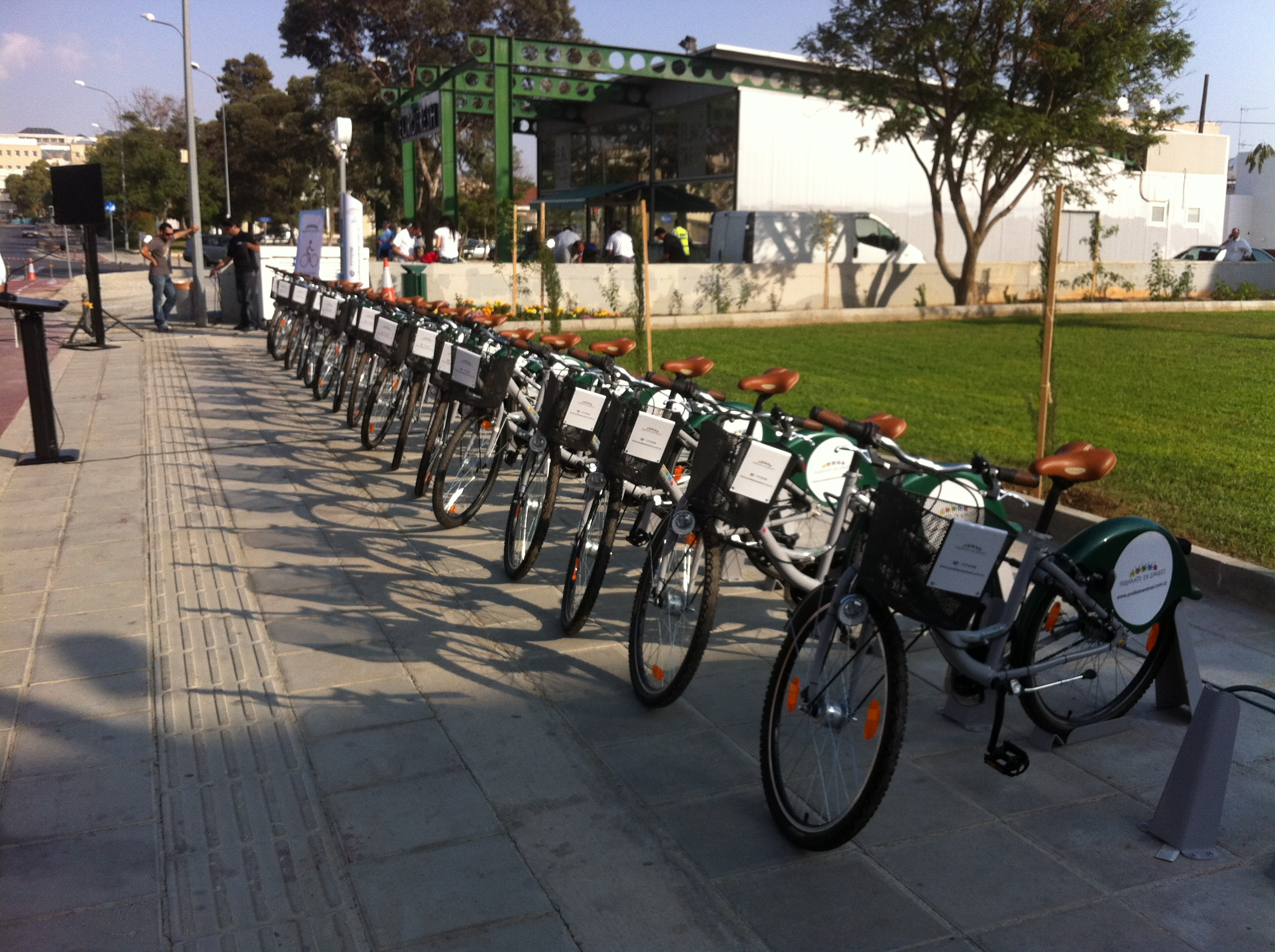
Bike in Action, Nicosia, Cyprus
