= Vélopop' =

French bike-sharing program

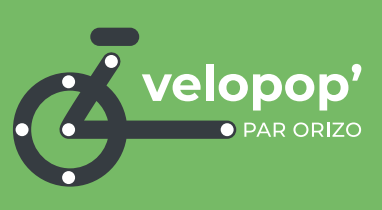

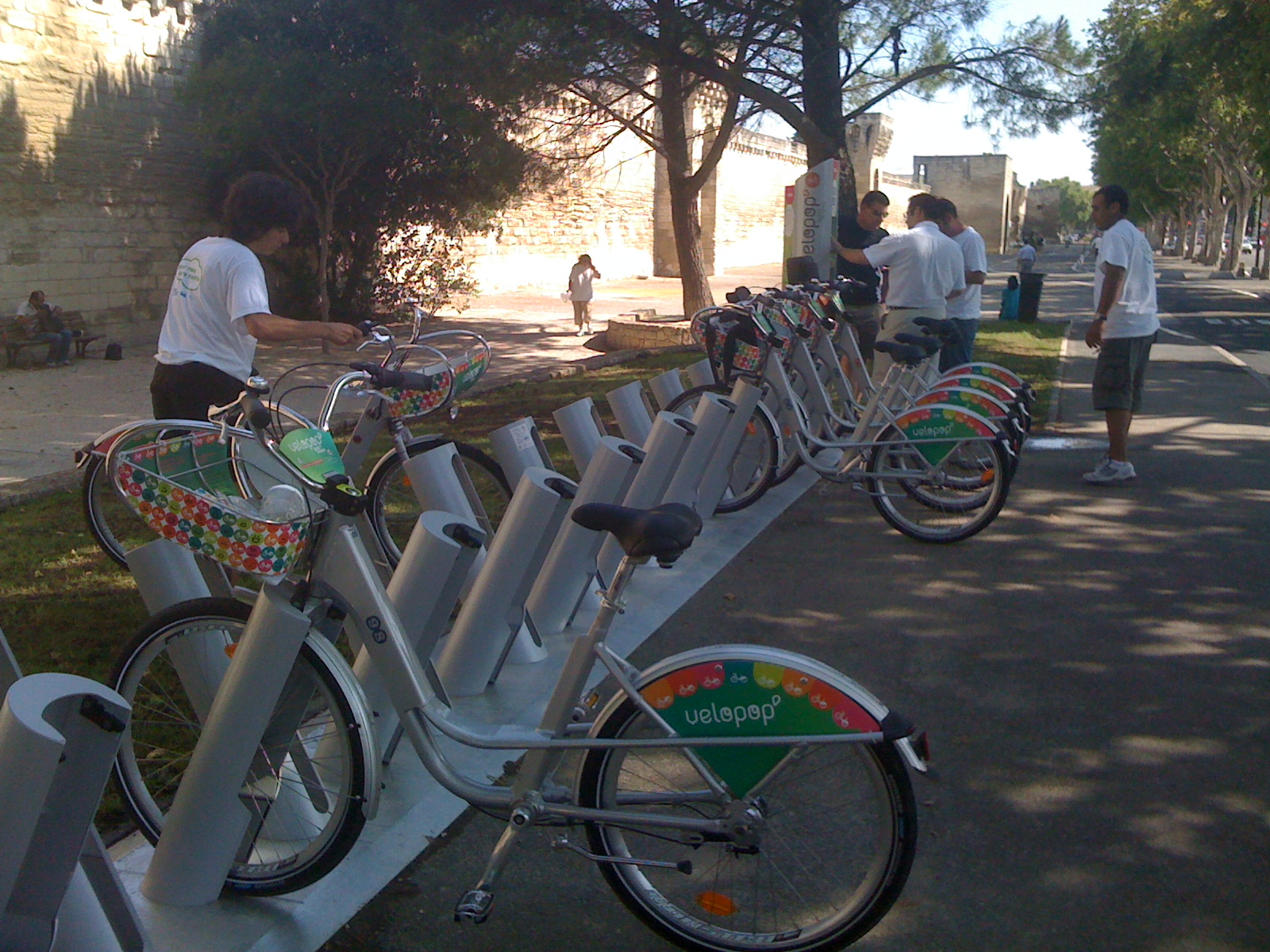
- A Vélopop' station outside the city walls

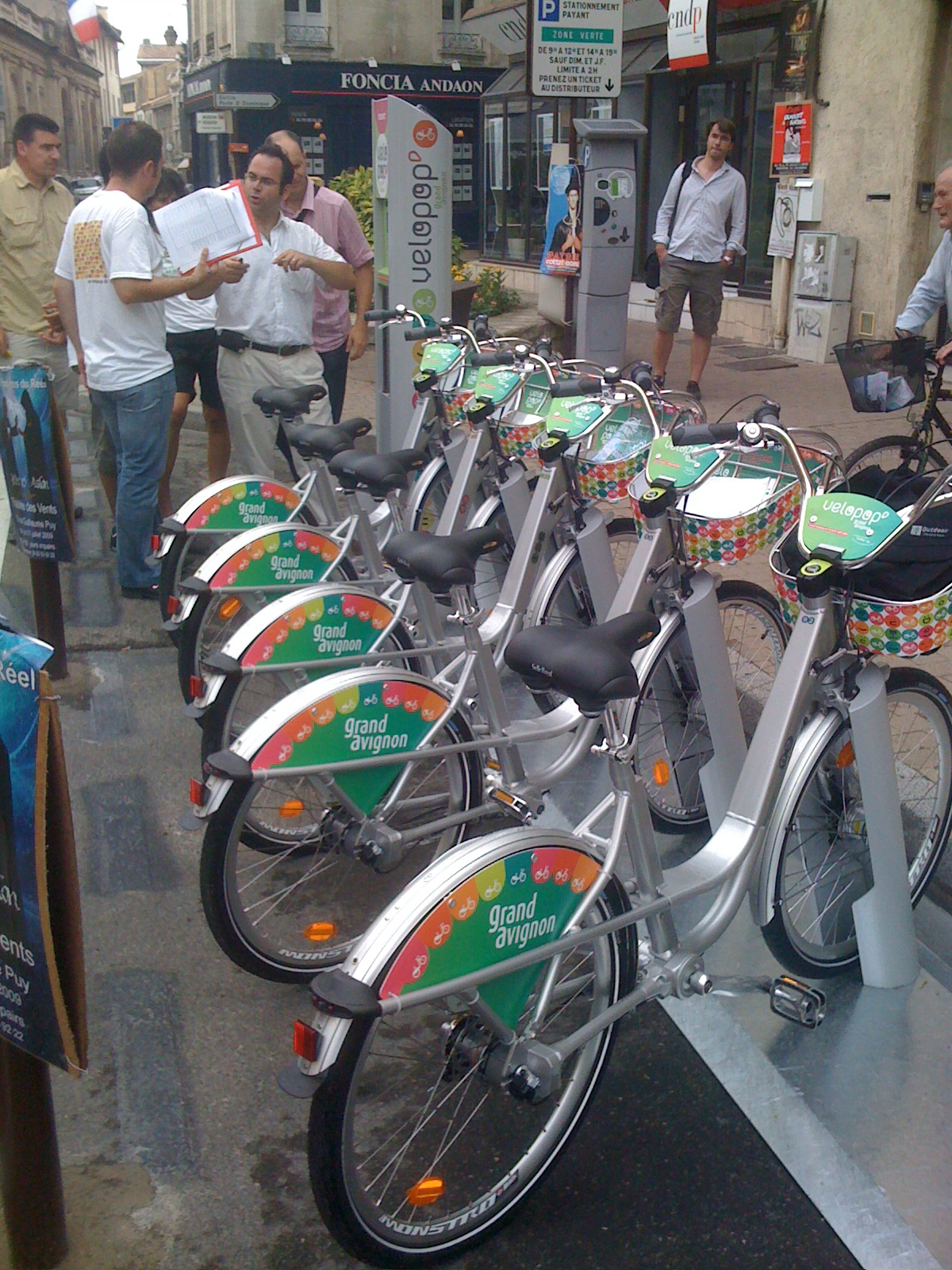
- The lightweight stations do not require construction work or electrical connection

Overview
- Owner: Communauté d'agglomération du Grand Avignon
- Area served: Avignon, France
- Website: velopop.fr

Operation
- Began operation: 10 July 2009; 17 years ago
- Number of vehicles: 200 bicycles

Vélopop' is a bike-sharing scheme in Avignon, France, launched on 10 July 2009, engineered by Smoove. This community bicycle program comprises 200 bicycles and 17 stations for short term renting. The bicycles are secured by a special fork in easy to install bicycle stands with mechanical keys distributed by automatic dispensers.

The system is designed and assembled in France and accessible at all times, inside and outside city walls.

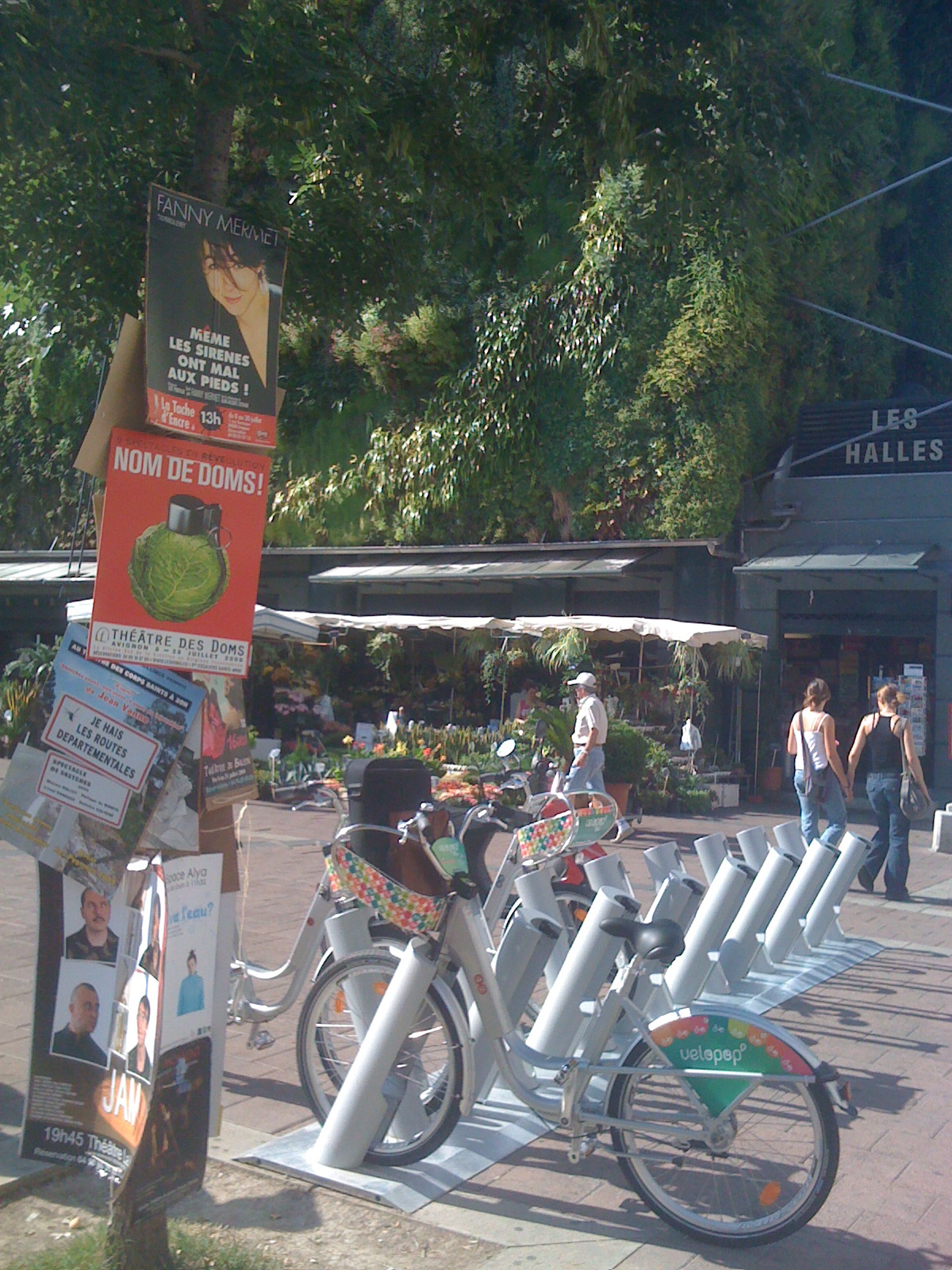
Place Pie station

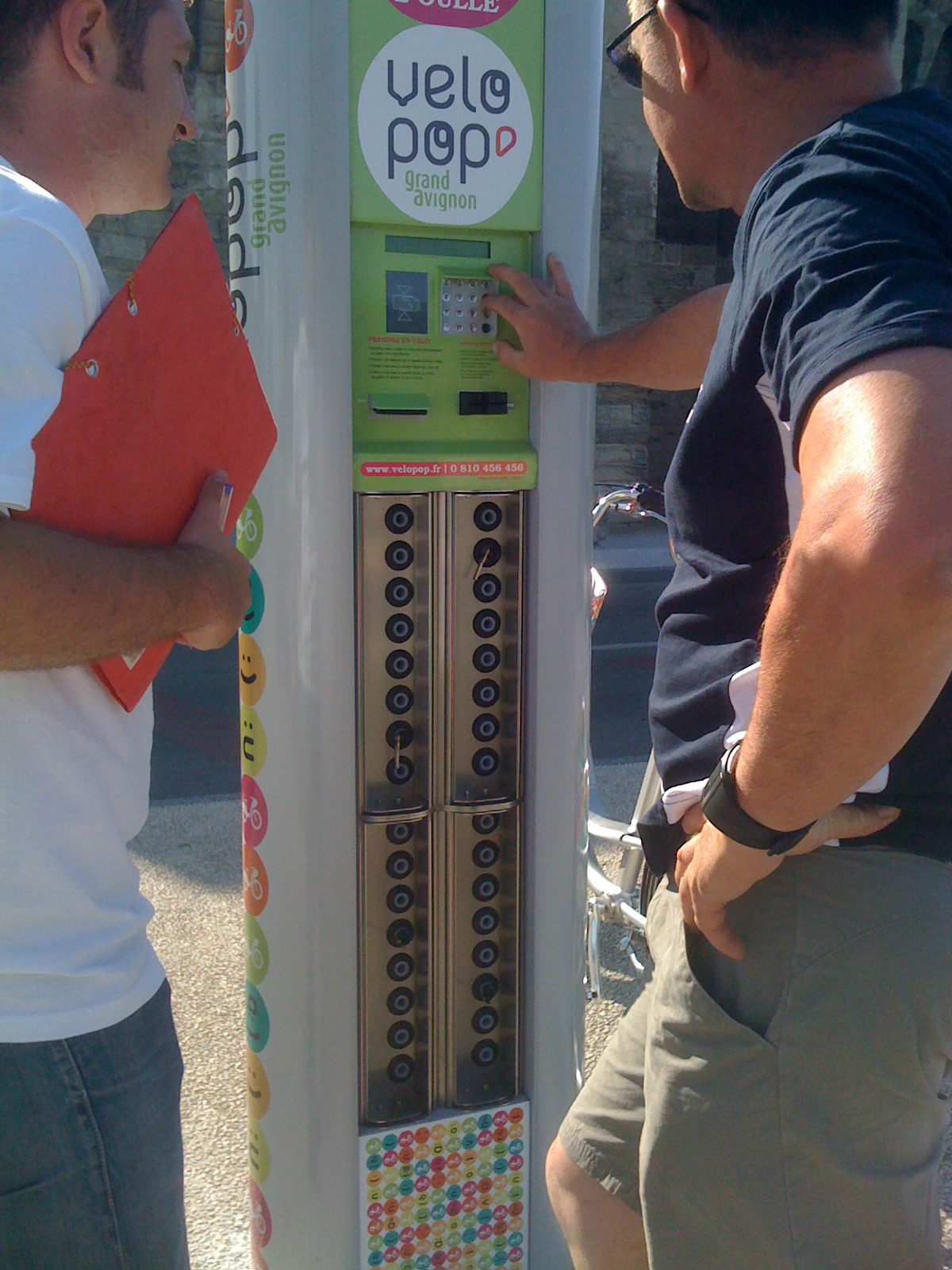
The key dispenser opens up and reveals the RFID keys
