= Cycling in Penang Island =

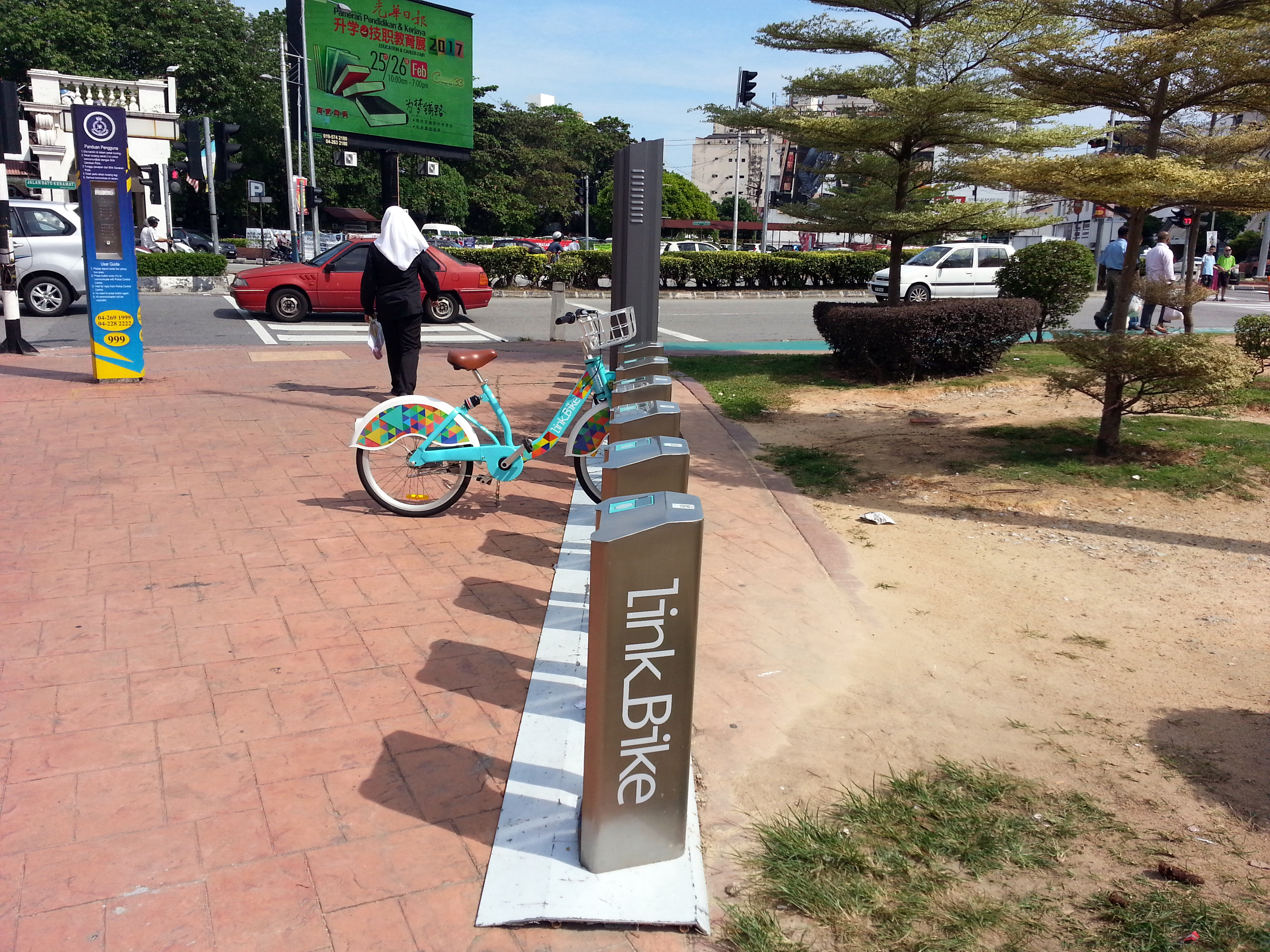
A LinkBike station near Komtar in George Town. LinkBike, a public bicycle sharing service, was launched in 2016.

Cycling in Penang Island refers to the use of bicycles in the city of George Town and elsewhere on Penang Island, Malaysia, either for recreational, touring or transportation purposes. While bicycles have long been in use in Penang, with rickshaws becoming a unique application of the pedal-driven vehicle in the state, the usage of bicycles has noticeably declined since the late 20th century due to the proliferation of cars as the main transportation mode.

In recent years, initiatives have been taken by the Penang state government, the Penang Island City Council and the private sector to revive and encourage the use of bicycles within Penang Island. These efforts, part of the wider push for greener transportation modes and to reduce traffic congestion, include the ongoing construction of cycling lanes within George Town and the introduction of a public bicycle sharing service. Local cycling activists have also organised a handful of utility and recreational cycling activities within the city.

== Background ==
Bicycles have been in use in the former British crown colony of Penang for over a century. For instance, it was recorded that in a single week in 1896, Britain exported almost 25,000 bicycles throughout the British Empire, with over 100 destined for Penang, then part of the Straits Settlements.

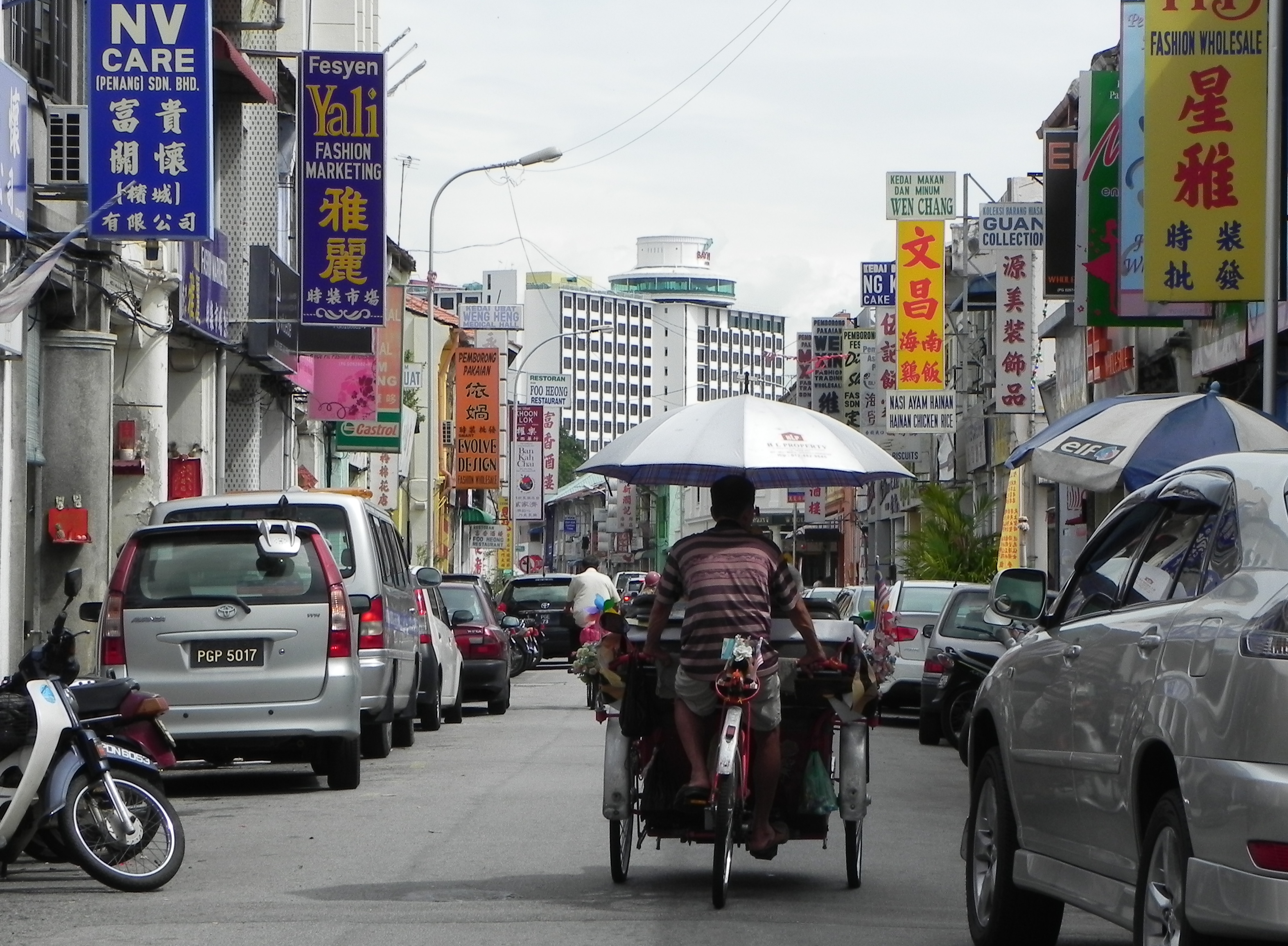
A trishaw on the streets of George Town.

However, cycling was initially a recreational activity enjoyed only by the European elites. Although the prices of bicycles were dropping dramatically, it was not until the 1920s when bicycles finally became affordable for the poorer Europeans and the larger Asian community, as cheaper Japanese models flooded the market. Cycling as a sport only took off in Penang in the mid-20th century.

Meanwhile, bicycles in Penang also spawned a unique mode of transportation - the trishaw, colloquially known in Malay as 'beca'. In the early 20th century, the trishaw became ubiquitous in the cities of the Straits Settlements, namely Penang, Singapore and Malacca. To this day, the trishaw, an icon synonymous with colonial Penang, is still in use in George Town, albeit mostly for sightseeing rides by tourists.

During the latter half of the 20th century, the proliferation of cars, exacerbated by federal government policies which encouraged the nascent national automotive industry, led to the decline of utility cycling in Penang. As a result, Penang has an abnormally high vehicle ownership rate, which stood at 1.06 cars per person in 2006 and rose to 1.4 in 2013. Another study also found that 56% of Penangites preferred driving as their main transportation mode to work or school.

With traffic congestion around George Town and other urban centres such as Bayan Lepas worsening, the Penang state government launched in 2016 the Penang Bicycle Route Master Plan in order to promote cycling as a healthier and more environmentally-friendly transportation mode, as well as to reduce the public's reliance on cars. The Penang state government also hoped to make Penang the first cycling state in Malaysia, and to revolutionise Penang's public transportation system.

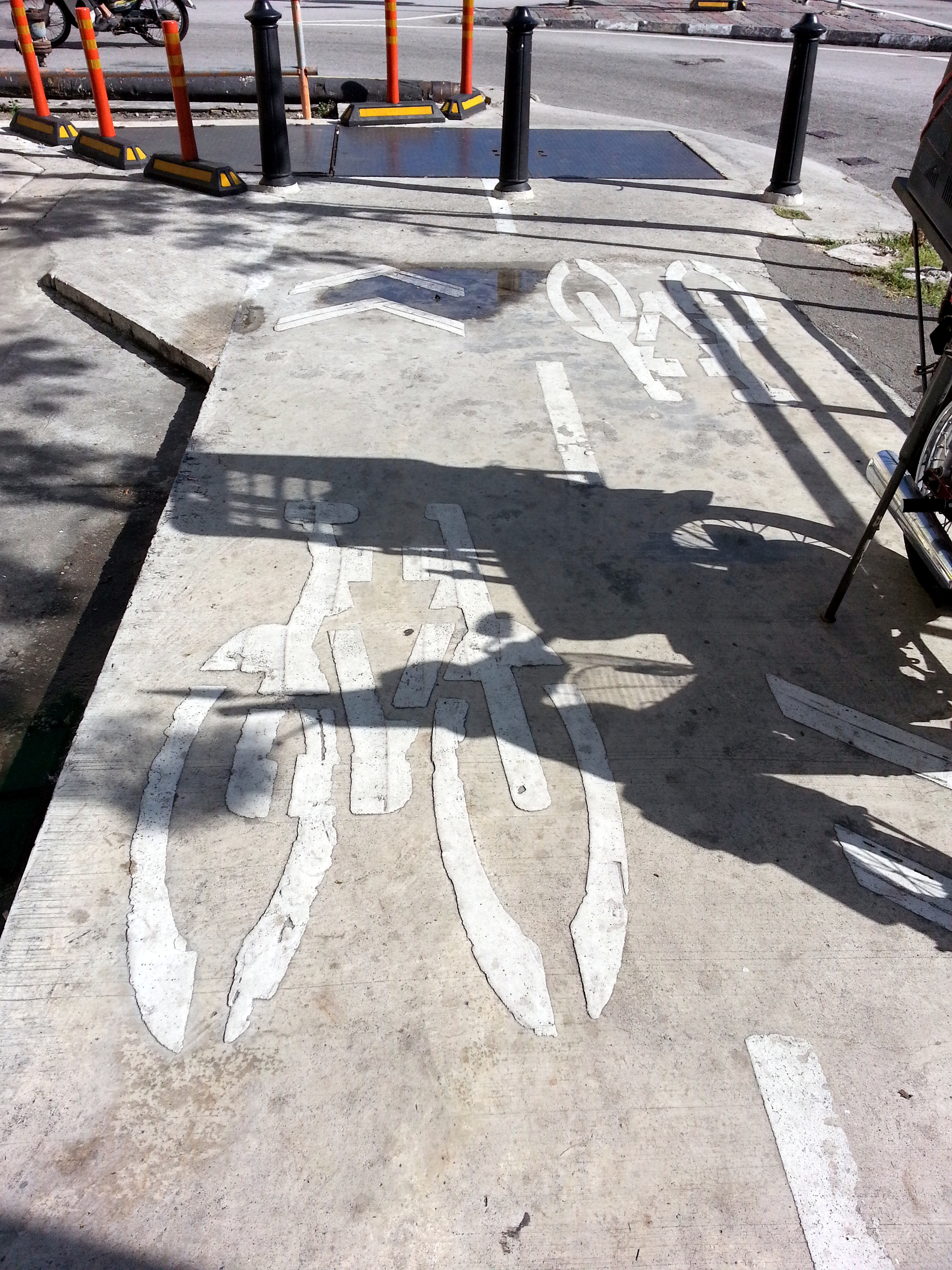
A cycling lane in George Town

== Cycling infrastructure and initiatives ==
The Penang Bicycle Route Master Plan envisages a minimum of 33 km (21 miles) of dedicated cycling paths within Penang Island by 2020. All in all, a total of 39.3 km (24.4 miles) of dedicated cycling routes has been planned as of 2016, with the first phase of the master plan, a 12.5 km (7.8 miles) coastal cycling path from George Town to Queensbay Mall, already completed.

Cycling path	Route	Status
Tanjung Bungah	Flamingo Hotel - Dalat International School	Completed
East Coast	Komtar - Jelutong - Gelugor - Queensbay Mall	Completed
Southeast Coast	Queensbay Mall - Bayan Baru - Penang International Airport	Planned
North Coast	Gurney Drive - Straits Quay	Planned
West Coast	Penang International Airport - Balik Pulau - Teluk Bahang - Batu Ferringhi - Tanjung Bungah - Tanjung Tokong	Planned

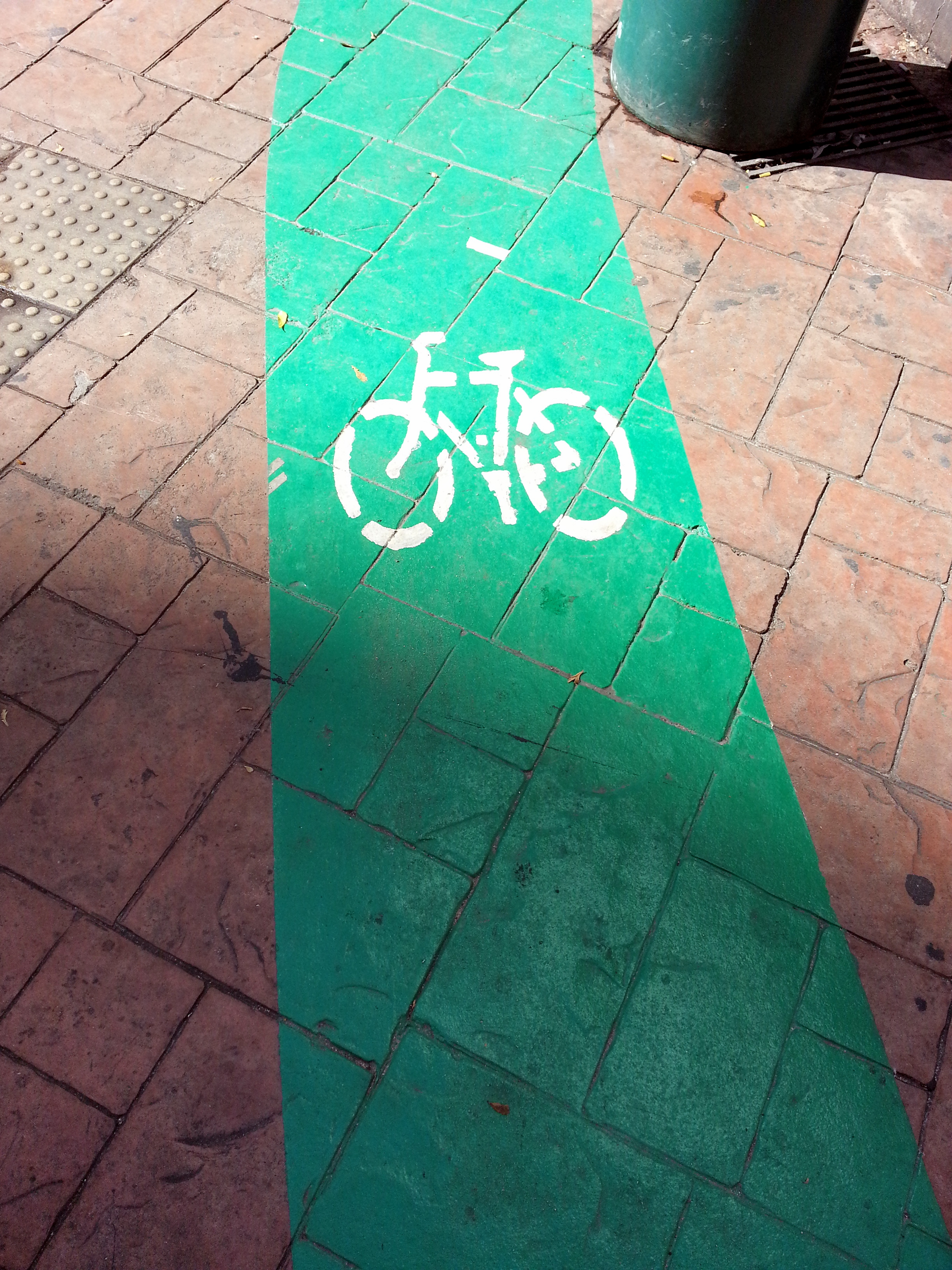
Another cycling route near Komtar, George Town, painted in green.

The completed coastal cycling path between George Town and Queensbay Mall to the south also includes a 1.5 km (0.93 miles) route between Komtar and Karpal Singh Drive, and a 70-metre-long concrete-and-steel bridge across the Pinang River. Much of the path runs along the eastern shoreline of Penang Island, specifically at Jelutong and Gelugor, thus offering scenic seaside views. The path is physically separated from the Tun Dr Lim Chong Eu Expressway alongside it and fenced off to minimise traffic hazards to cyclists. Into the city centre, the cycling path has been painted green and are also shared with pedestrians.

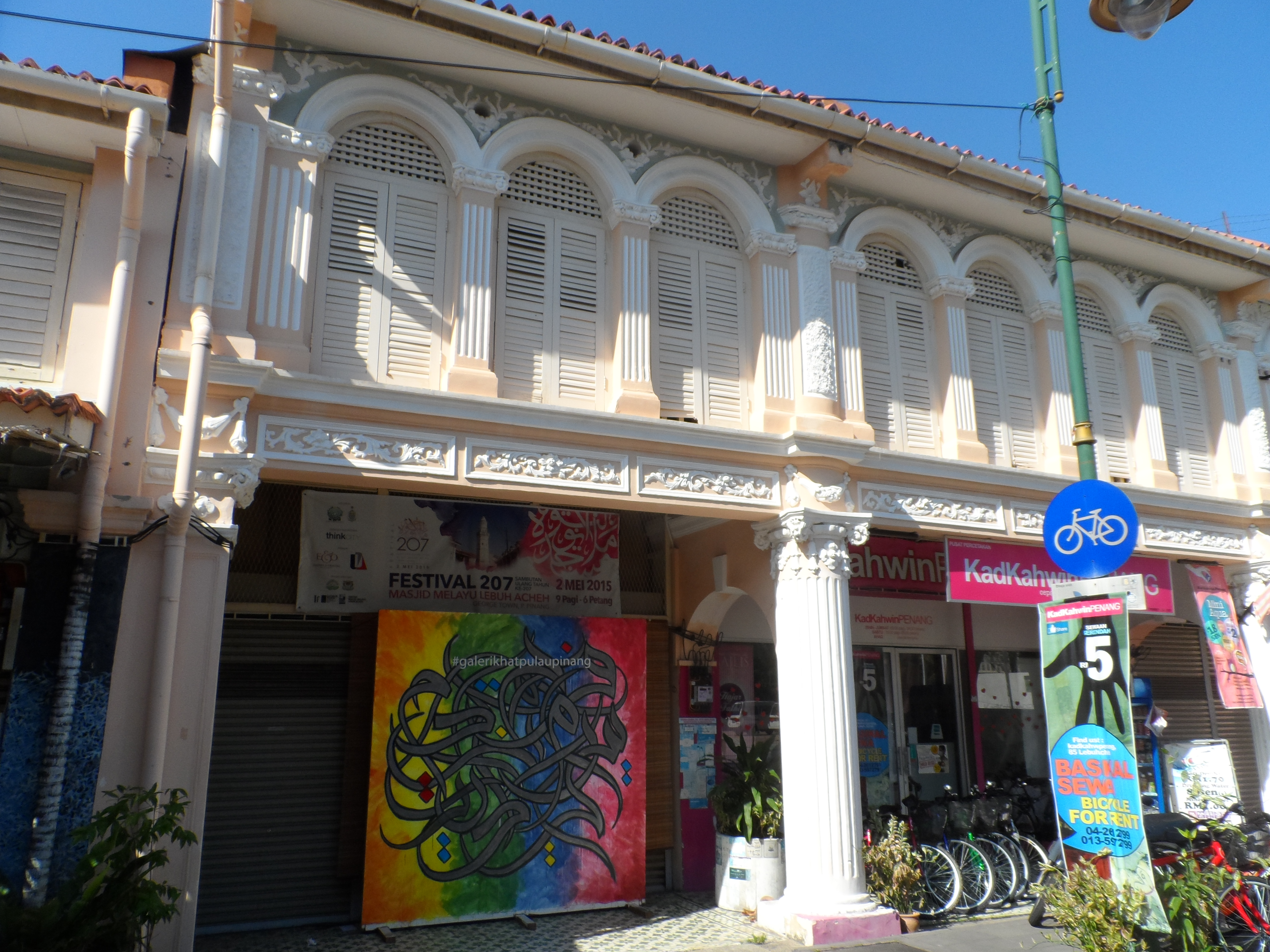
A cyclists' sign at Acheen Street within George Town's UNESCO World Heritage Site.

In addition to the future routes round Penang Island, sidewalks along certain streets within George Town's UNESCO World Heritage Site, such as Pitt Street, have also been painted green for similar purposes. There is also another existing cycling path at Tanjung Bungah, running for 1.2 km (0.75 miles) between Flamingo Hotel by the Beach and Dalat International School.

In 2017, cyclist crossing lights have been installed at certain locations within the city centre as a measure to improve the safety of cyclists, especially when crossing busy intersections.

Beginning in 2020, Penang's city council began painting orange boxes at the beginning of roads where traffic wait for traffic lights. The purpose of these coloured boxes is to offer both motorcyclist and cyclist a designated space segregated away from cars.

=== Bicycle rental services ===
In recent years, bicycle rental services have been marketed within George Town by a number of private companies. These cater mainly to tourists wishing to tour the numerous attractions within the city centre's UNESCO World Heritage Site on bicycles.

In 2016, LinkBike, a public bicycle-sharing service jointly funded by the Penang Island City Council and a private firm, was launched, making George Town the first city in Malaysia to implement such a system. It requires the use of smartphones to rent a bicycle at any one of the 25 electronic LinkBike stations within George Town.

=== Portability on public buses ===
Foldable bicycles, of a maximum dimension of 180 cm (5.9 ft) in length and 120 cm (3.9 ft) in height, are allowed on board Rapid Penang buses.

== Cycling activism ==
Local cyclists have also responded by organising group cycling activities within Penang Island. Some of these activities include the weekly BikeonFriday (BoF) and the annual Campaign for a Lane (CFOL).
