= Cove (disambiguation) =

A cove is a small type of bay or coastal inlet.

Cove or coving may also refer to:

== Places ==
=== United Kingdom ===
- Cove, Argyll, village in Scotland
- Cove, Hampshire, village in England
- Cove, Highland, village in Scotland
- Cove, Scottish Borders, Berwickshire
- Cove Bay, a suburb of Aberdeen, Scotland

=== United States ===
- Cove, Arizona
- Cove, Arkansas
- Cove, Missouri
- Cove, Oregon
- Cove, Texas
- Cove, Utah

=== Other places ===
- Cove, Ireland, a former name of the town Cobh
- Cové, a city in Benin
- Cove Pond, Anguilla
- Cove LRT station, an LRT station on the Punggol LRT line East Loop in Singapore

== Sport ==
- Cove F.C., an association football club in Cove, Hampshire, England
- Cove Rangers F.C., an association football club in Cove Bay, Aberdeen, Scotland

== Other uses ==
- Cove (Appalachian Mountains), a type of valley found in the Appalachian Mountains, US
- Cove (brand), a dishwasher brand produced in the US
- Cove (standing stones), a megalithic feature
- CoVE, Centre of Vocational Excellence
- Coving (interior design), a strip of material used to cover transitions between surfaces or for decoration
- Cove (street), a U.S. regional term for a dead-end street
- Coving (urban planning), a method of layout for housing subdivisions

== See also ==
- Malham Cove, a cliff in Yorkshire, England
- The Cove (disambiguation)
- Cove School (disambiguation)
