= The Cove =

The Cove may refer to:

== Places ==
- The Cove (Stamford, Connecticut), a neighborhood
- The Cove, New Zealand, a settlement near Dunedin, New Zealand
- The Cove, Penang, a residential complex near George Town in Penang, Malaysia
- The Cove, a grouping of three megaliths at Avebury
- The Cove Palisades State Park, Oregon, United States

== Other uses ==
- The Cove (film), a 2009 documentary film that describes the annual killing of dolphins in a National Park at Taiji, Wakayama
- The Cove (novel), a 2012 novel by Ron Rash
- "The Cove", nickname of the supporters of Australian soccer team Sydney FC
- The Cove Luxury Resort, a hotel in the Bahamas
- The Cove FC, an association football team based in Adelaide, Australia

== See also ==
- Cove (disambiguation)
- Cove, a geographical feature
