= Pulau Tikus (disambiguation) =

Pulau Tikus is a neighborhood within the downtown core of George Town in the Malaysian state of Penang.

Pulau Tikus may also refer to:

- Tikus Island, former name of islet off the northern coast of Penang Island in the Malaysian state of Penang
- Pulau Tikus (state constituency), state constituency in Penang, Malaysia
