= Tanjong Bungah =

- Suburb of George Town
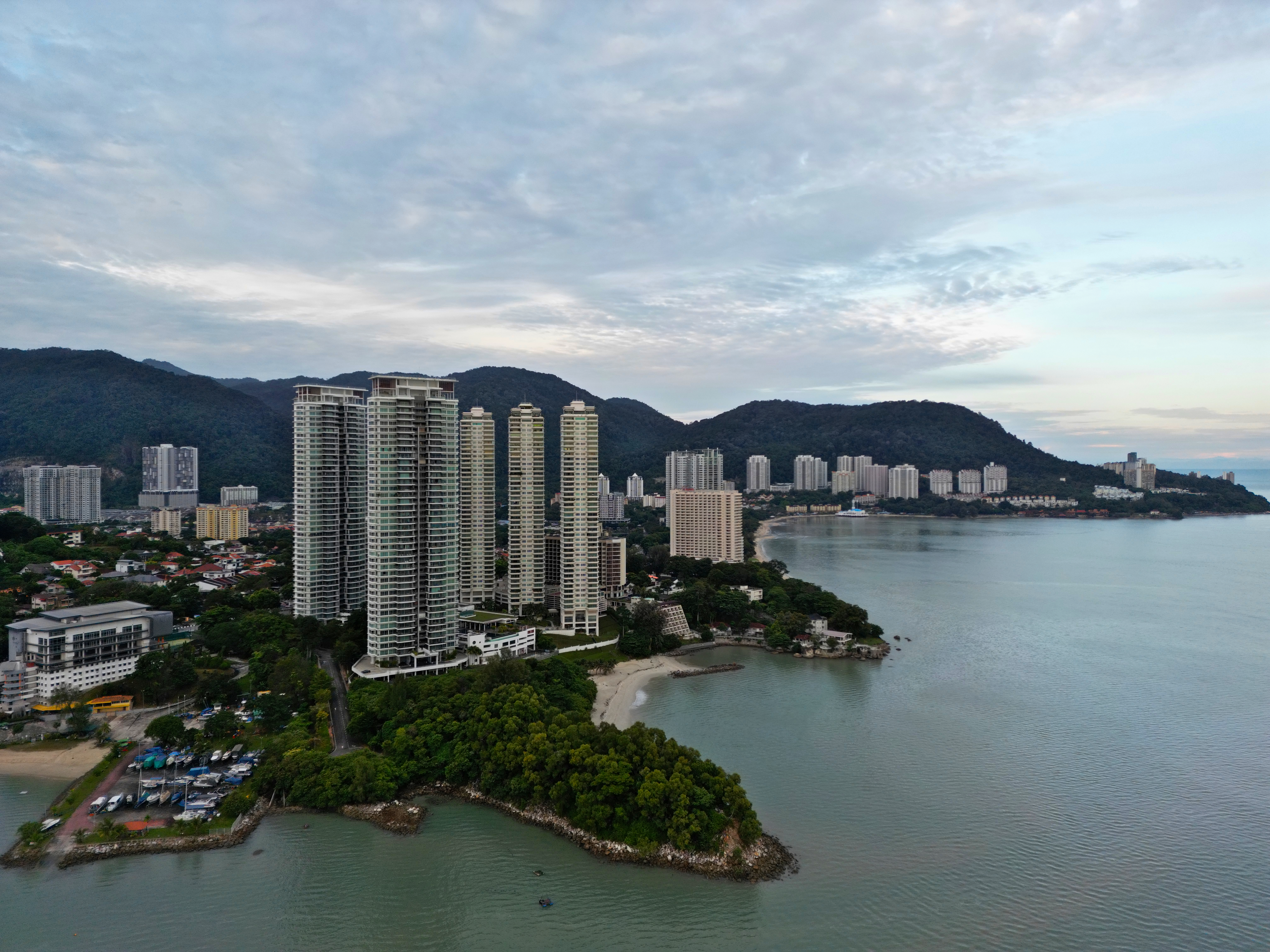

- Location within George Town in Penang
- Coordinates: 5°28′7″N 100°17′8″E
- Country: Malaysia
- State: Penang
- City: George Town
- District: Northeast

Area
  - Total: 2.8 km^{2} (1.1 sq mi)

Population (2020)
  - Total: 14,271
  - Density: 5,100/km^{2} (13,000/sq mi)

Demographics
  - Ethnic groups: 70.3% Chinese; 10.7% Bumiputera; 10.3% Malay; 0.4% indigenous groups from Sabah and Sarawak; 7.7% Indian; 2.1% Other ethnicities; 9.2% Non-citizens
- Time zone: UTC+8 (MST)
  - Summer (DST): Not observed
- Postal code: 11200

Tanjong Bungah (Note: Also spelt as Tanjung Bungah.) is a suburb of George Town in the Malaysian state of Penang. A pioneer district where the wealthy live. It is located along the northern coast of Penang Island between Batu Ferringhi and Tanjong Tokong, about 6.5 km (4.0 mi) northwest of the city centre.

Tanjong Bungah is locally known as a beach destination, with several hotels and resorts lining the beaches within the area. Decades of urbanisation have also led to the mushrooming of residential high-rises at the suburb and attracted a significant expatriate population; foreigners made up 9.2% of Tanjong Bungah's population as of 2020.

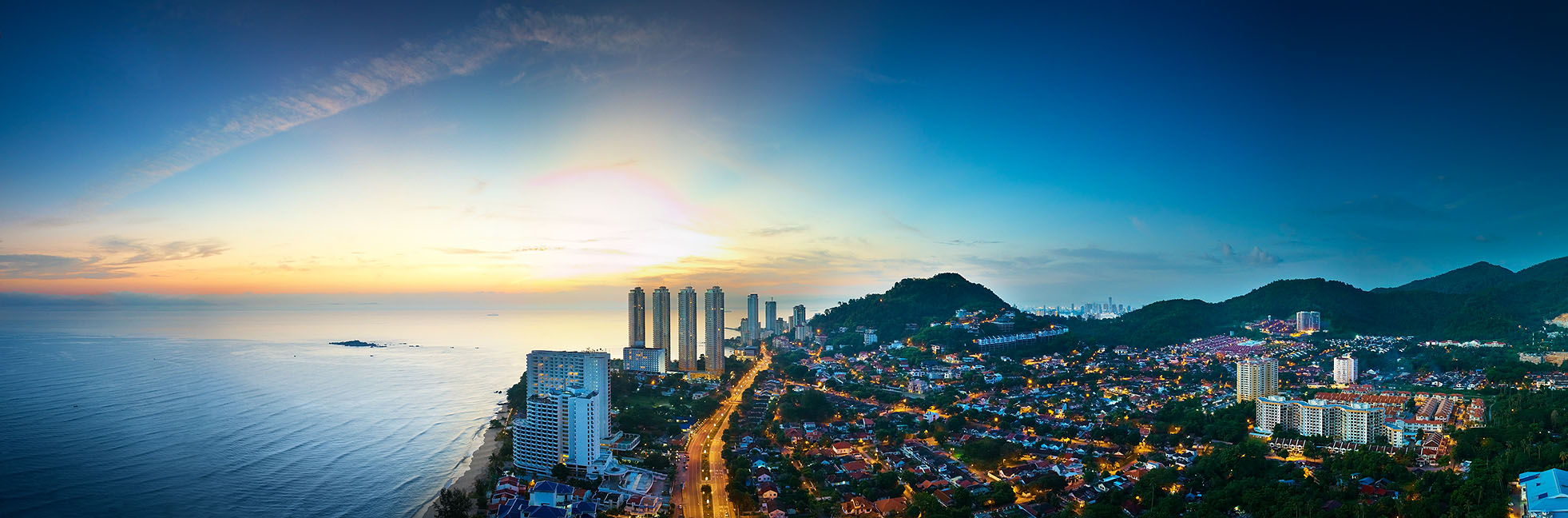
Panoramic view of Tanjong Bungah

== Etymology ==
Tanjong Bungah, which means Flower Cape in Malay, was so named due to the several smaller promontories that jut out to the sea along the cape.

== History ==
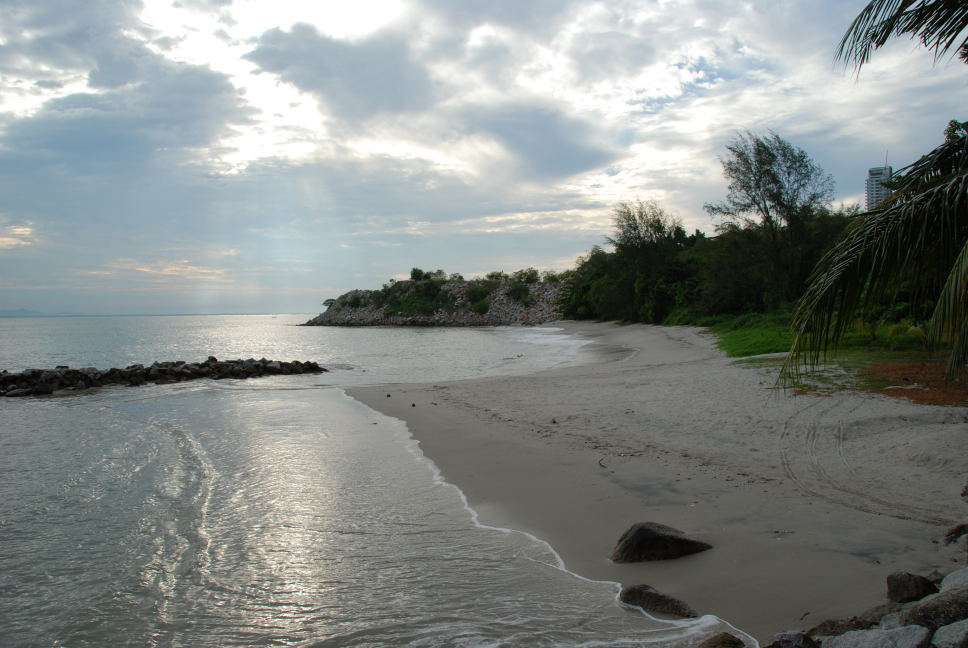
The beaches of Tanjong Bungah

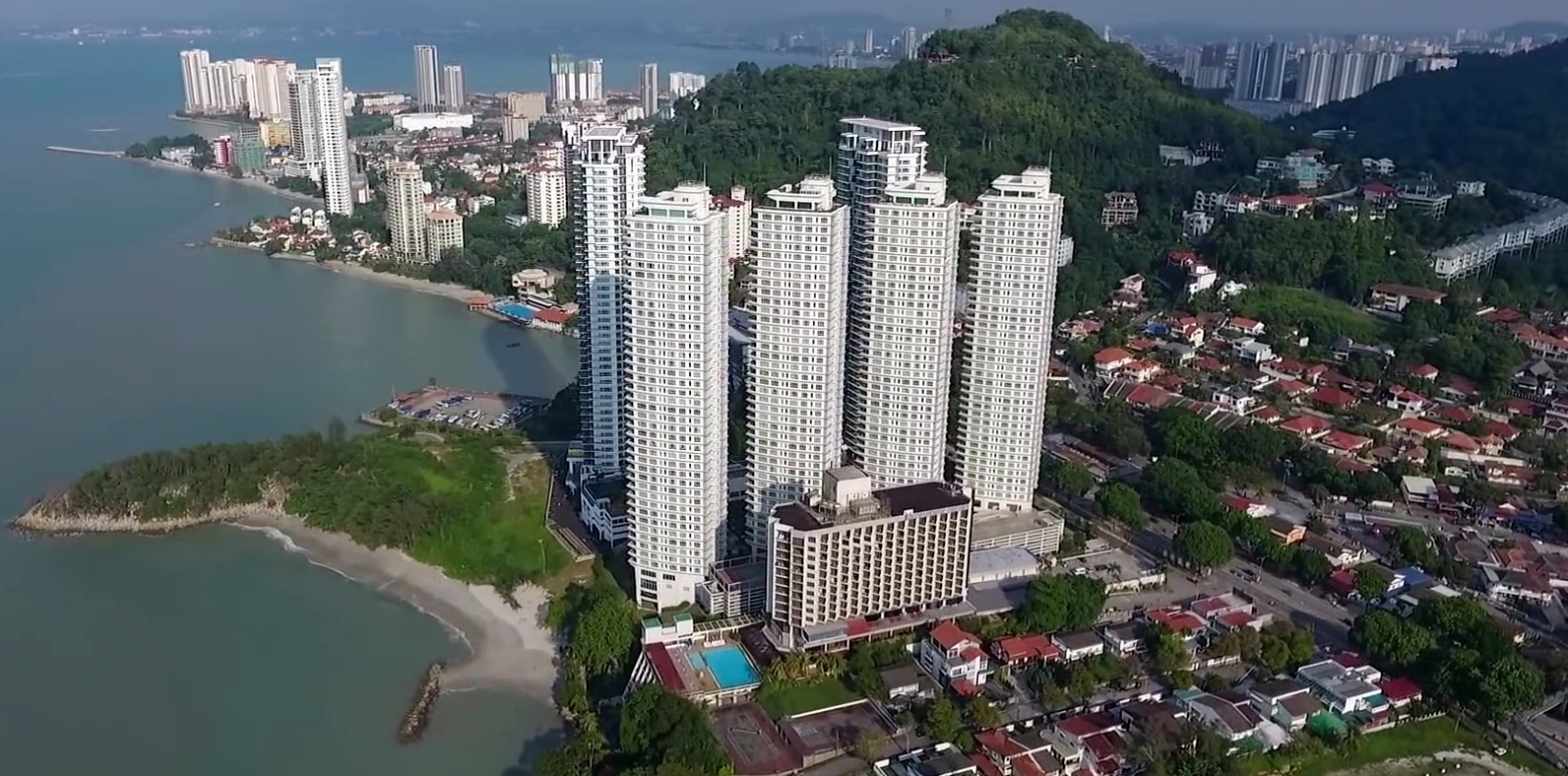
Residential high-rises such as The Cove (pictured here) have been built within Tanjong Bungah in recent years.

Tanjong Bungah was formerly a quiet fishing village populated by Malay and Chinese fishermen. It only gained prominence as a beach destination of choice for locals and tourists in the 1950s. At the time, Batu Ferringhi had yet to be developed. The pristine waters off Tanjong Bungah also attracted two local swimming clubs into the area – the Penang Swimming Club and the Penang Chinese Swimming Club.

The Royal Australian Air Force personnel who were stationed in Penang during the Malayan Emergency and the Indonesian Confrontation would escape to their residences at Tanjong Bungah, known as the Hillside. The spouses of the Australian servicemen also operated an amateur English language radio station – Radio RAAF – which could be tuned in throughout Penang and parts of neighbouring Kedah.

The urbanisation of Tanjong Bungah began in the 1980s, leading to the construction of numerous residential high-rises along the shoreline. The development of Tanjong Bungah has also attracted expatriates who chose to retire on Penang Island, as the suburb is located within commuting distance of the city centre, the shopping malls at Tanjong Tokong and the beaches of Batu Ferringhi. Four international schools have been established here as well – Dalat International School, Prince of Wales Island International Primary School, Pelita International School and Tenby International School.

Tanjong Bungah was one of the hardest hit areas during the 2004 Indian Ocean tsunami that ultimately claimed a total of 52 lives in Penang. The Floating Mosque was subsequently built in 2005 and is now a major landmark at Tanjong Bungah.

== Geography ==
Map of Tanjong Bungah.
Click link at the top right corner to zoom in.
1 Tanjong Bungah Market
2 Floating Mosque
3 College General
4 Pearl Hill
5 Tikus Island
6 One Tanjong
7 The Cove
8 Dalat International School
9 Prince of Wales Island International School
10 Penang Swimming Club

== Demographics ==
Ethnicities within Tanjong Bungah in 2020
Ethnicities / Nationality	Percentage
Chinese	70.3%
Malays	10.3%
Other Bumiputeras	0.4%
Indians	7.7%
Others	2.1%
Non-Malaysians	9.2%

As of 2020, Tanjong Bungah was home to a population of 14,271, resulting in a population density of 5,097/km^{2} (13,200/sq mi). Ethnic Chinese constituted over 70% of the area's population, while Malays formed another 10%. The suburb's expatriate community made up over 9% of the population, followed by Indians at nearly 8%.

== Transportation ==
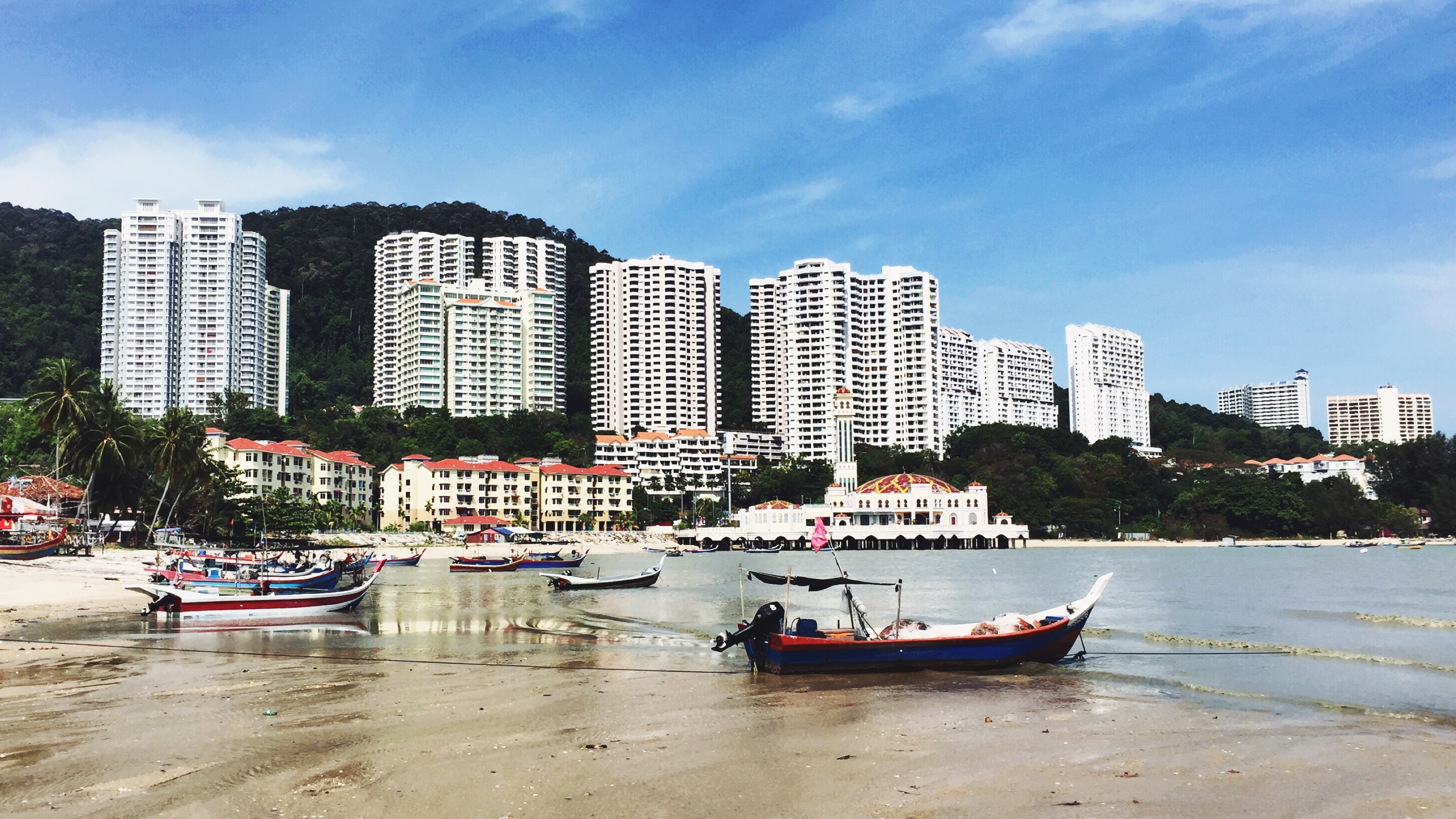
Condominiums at Tanjong Bungah

The main thoroughfare within Tanjong Bungah is the coastal Jalan Tanjong Bungah, part of Federal Route 6. The road continues on from Jalan Tanjong Tokong, cutting through the heart of the Tanjong Bungah until it becomes Jalan Batu Ferringhi near the western edge of the suburb. Alternatively, Vale of Tempe Road, stretching along the hills further inland, is used by motorists to exit Tanjong Bungah towards the neighbouring Tanjong Tokong suburb and on to the city centre, and vice versa.

Rapid Penang buses 101, 102 and 104 serve the residents of the suburb, by connecting Tanjong Bungah with various destinations in the city, such as Tanjong Tokong, Batu Ferringhi, the Penang International Airport and Queensbay Mall.

In addition, a short cycling lane has been installed within Tanjong Bungah as part of the move to encourage cycling as a form of alternative transportation. The 1.2 km (0.75 miles)-long cycling lane, painted in green and measuring about 90 cm (35 in) in width, stretches between Flamingo Hotel and Dalat International School. At the time of its launch in 2013, it was the first dedicated cycling lane in Penang.

== Education ==
A total of two primary schools, one Secondary school, one combined school and two international schools are located within Tanjong Bungah.

Primary schools

- Tanjong Bungah National Primary School
- Poay Wah National Type Chinese Primary School

Secondary school

- Tanjong Bungah National Secondary School

Combined school

- Federal Special Education National Schools (Primary and Secondary Deaf Schools)

International schools

- Prince of Wales Island International Primary School
- Dalat International School

Apart from the aforementioned educational institutions, Tanjong Bungah is home to College General, a Catholic seminary founded in 1808, and a Royal Malaysian Air Force training school.

== Health care ==
The Mount Miriam Cancer Hospital, situated at Jalan Bulan between Tanjong Bungah and Tanjong Tokong, is a private hospital that specialises in cancer treatments.

== Sports ==
The Penang Swimming Club at Jalan Tanjong Bungah, overlooking the sea, has a history stretching back to the 1900s. Originally a single-storey wooden structure, an Olympic-sized swimming pool was built in 1930. The club also initially restricted membership to Europeans; this discriminatory practice only ended in the 1940s. Today, aside from the swimming pool, the club organises regattas, sailing competitions and other aquatic sports classes for its members.
