= Tikus Island =

Islet off the coast of Penang Island in Malaysia

Native name: Pulau Tikus
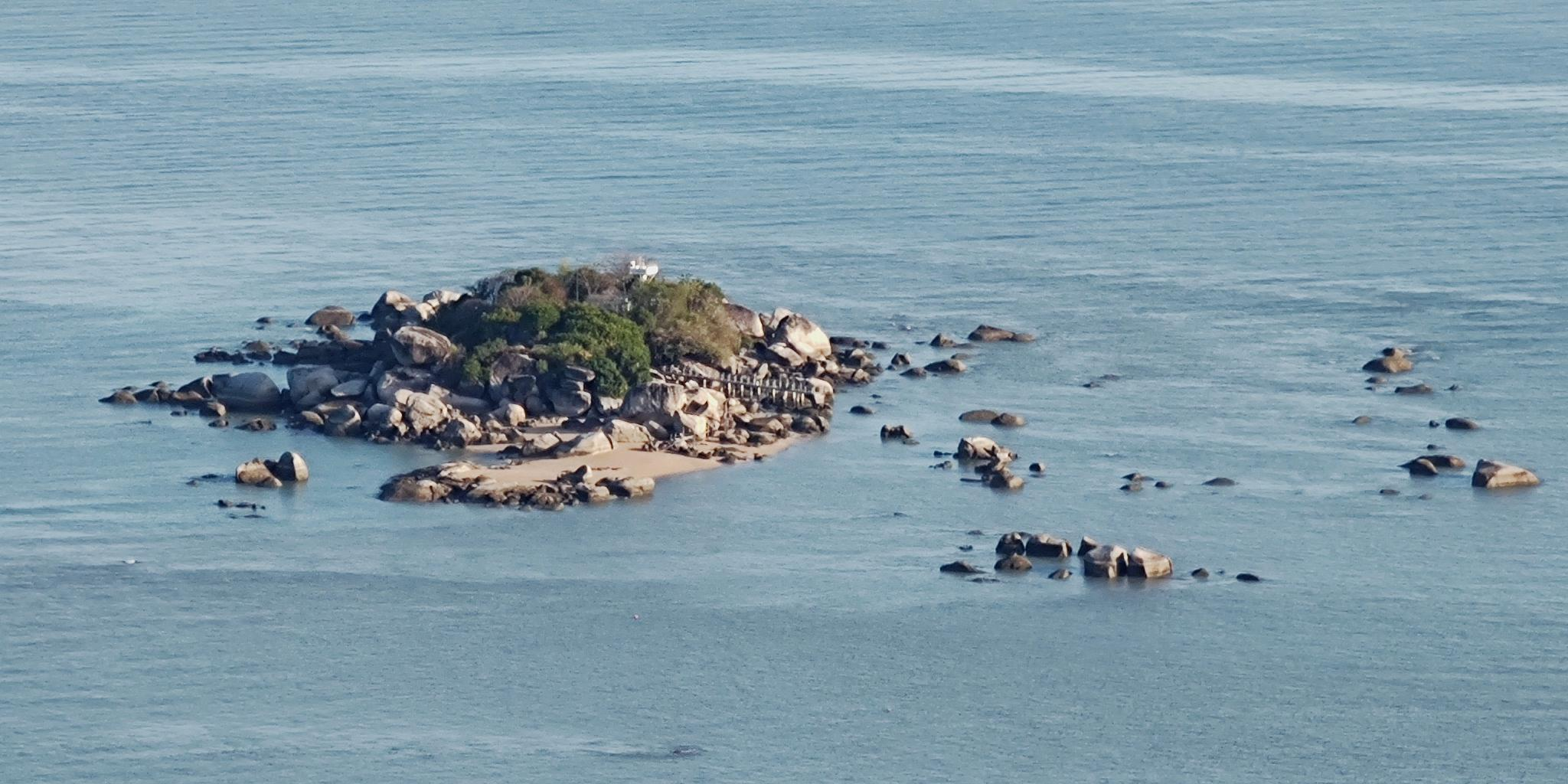
- Tikus and nearby islands viewed from Pearl Hill

Geography
- Location: Strait of Malacca
- Coordinates: 5°28′32.5776″N 100°17′50.2146″E

Administration
- Malaysia
- State: Penang
- City: George Town
- District: Northeast
- Mukim: Tanjong Bungah

Tikus Island is an islet off the northern coast of Penang Island in the Malaysian state of Penang. Located nearly 770 m (0.48 miles) off Tanjung Bungah, a suburb of George Town, this uninhabited outcrop is now home to a solar-powered lighthouse. This active lighthouse marks the northern entrance to the Penang Strait and hence, the Port of Penang.

Also situated on the islet is a grave belonging to a local Muslim saint. The grave is still visited by local Penangites of various faiths, who occasionally come to seek blessings irrespective of their beliefs.

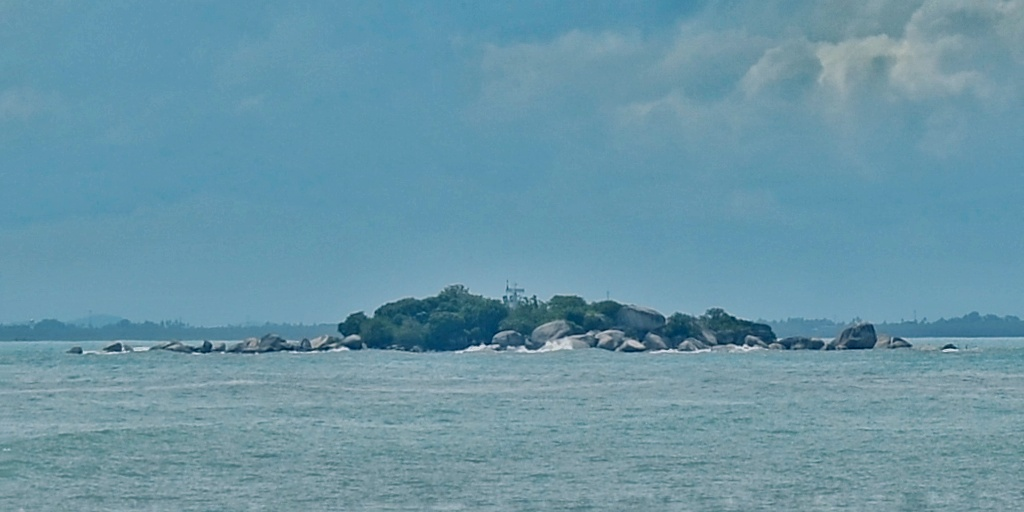
Tikus Island viewed from the Floating Mosque

== Etymology ==
The islet has lent its name to Pulau Tikus, a neighbourhood of George Town. The settlement of Pulau Tikus was established by Eurasian refugees in the early 19th century, who had earlier landed on Tikus Island. It was said that the name Pulau Tikus, which means 'Rat Island' in Malay, was inspired by the shape of the islet's rocks and dunes.

== Transportation ==
Tikus Island is only accessible by boat. Whilst kayaks are available at the Penang Water Sports Centre at Tanjung Bungah, the rough sea current has hindered several approach attempts to the islet in the past.

== See also ==
- List of islands of Malaysia
