= Cove School =

Cove School may refer to:

- Cove School, Hampshire, a community secondary school in Farnborough, Hampshire, England
- Cove School (Oregon), a public charter school in Union County, Oregon, United States

== See also ==
- Cove (disambiguation)
