= LinkBike =

Bicycle sharing system in George Town, Malaysia

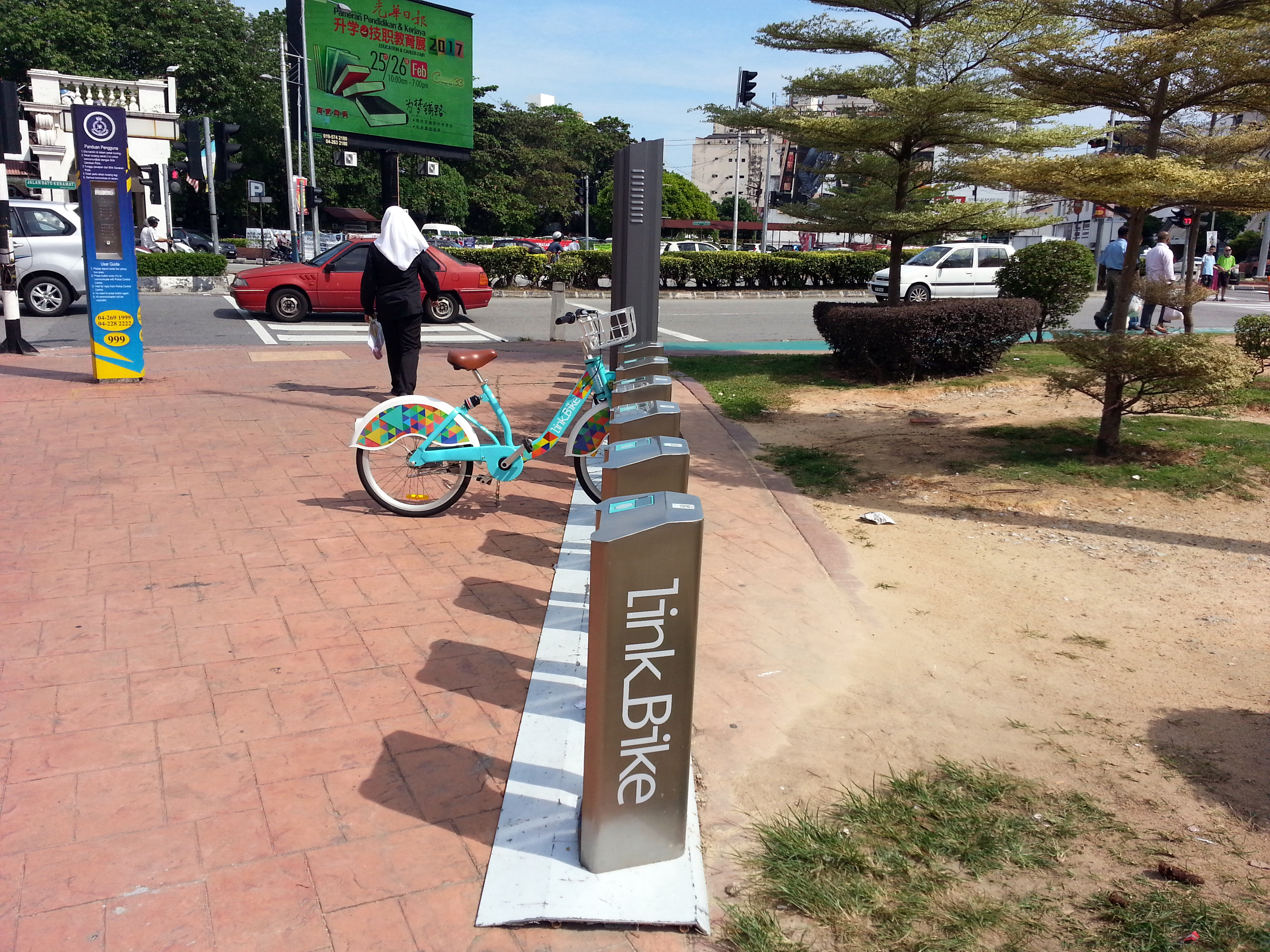
- A LinkBike station near Komtar in George Town.

Overview
- Locale: George Town, Penang
- Transit type: Public bicycle sharing service
- Number of stations: 25
- Headquarters: Esplanade, George Town, Penang
- Website: linkbike.my

Operation
- Began operation: December 17, 2016; 9 years ago
- Operator: Fast Rent Bike (PG) Sdn. Bhd.
- Number of vehicles: 250

LinkBike is a public bicycle sharing system serving the city of George Town in Penang, Malaysia. Launched in 2016, it is the first such system in Malaysia. Currently, there are 250 LinkBike bicycles and 25 stations throughout the city, including its UNESCO World Heritage Site, as well as suburban places like Queensbay Mall.

LinkBike, which is jointly funded by the Penang Island City Council and Fast Rent Bike (PG) Sdn. Bhd, a local private limited firm, is part of the wider efforts undertaken by the Penang state government to alleviate traffic congestion within George Town, as well as to promote environmentally-friendly alternative transportation modes.

== History ==
In August 2016, the Chief Minister of Penang, Lim Guan Eng, announced the planned public bicycle sharing service within George Town. The proposed system, an internet of things (IoT)-based initiative of the Penang Island City Council, is to be operated on a public-owned and privately managed model. Of the RM1.85 million allocated to run the service, 90% was to be borne by the Penang Island City Council, while Fast Rent Bike (PG), which contributed the remaining 10% of the cost, would operate the system.

LinkBike was launched on December 17, 2016, with nine stations within George Town and an initial fleet of 60 bicycles. Not only is LinkBike the first public bicycle sharing system in Malaysia, it also made George Town the first city in Malaysia to operate such a system.

LinkBike's fleet was enlarged to 250 bicycles by April 2017. Since its launch, LinkBike recorded a ridership figure of 3,422 as of 11 April 2017. This figure rose sharply to 8,583 by 28 May. Simultaneously, LinkBike has been expanded to 25 stations scattered throughout George Town, covering various destinations between Gurney Drive to the north and Queensbay Mall, near Bayan Lepas, to the south.

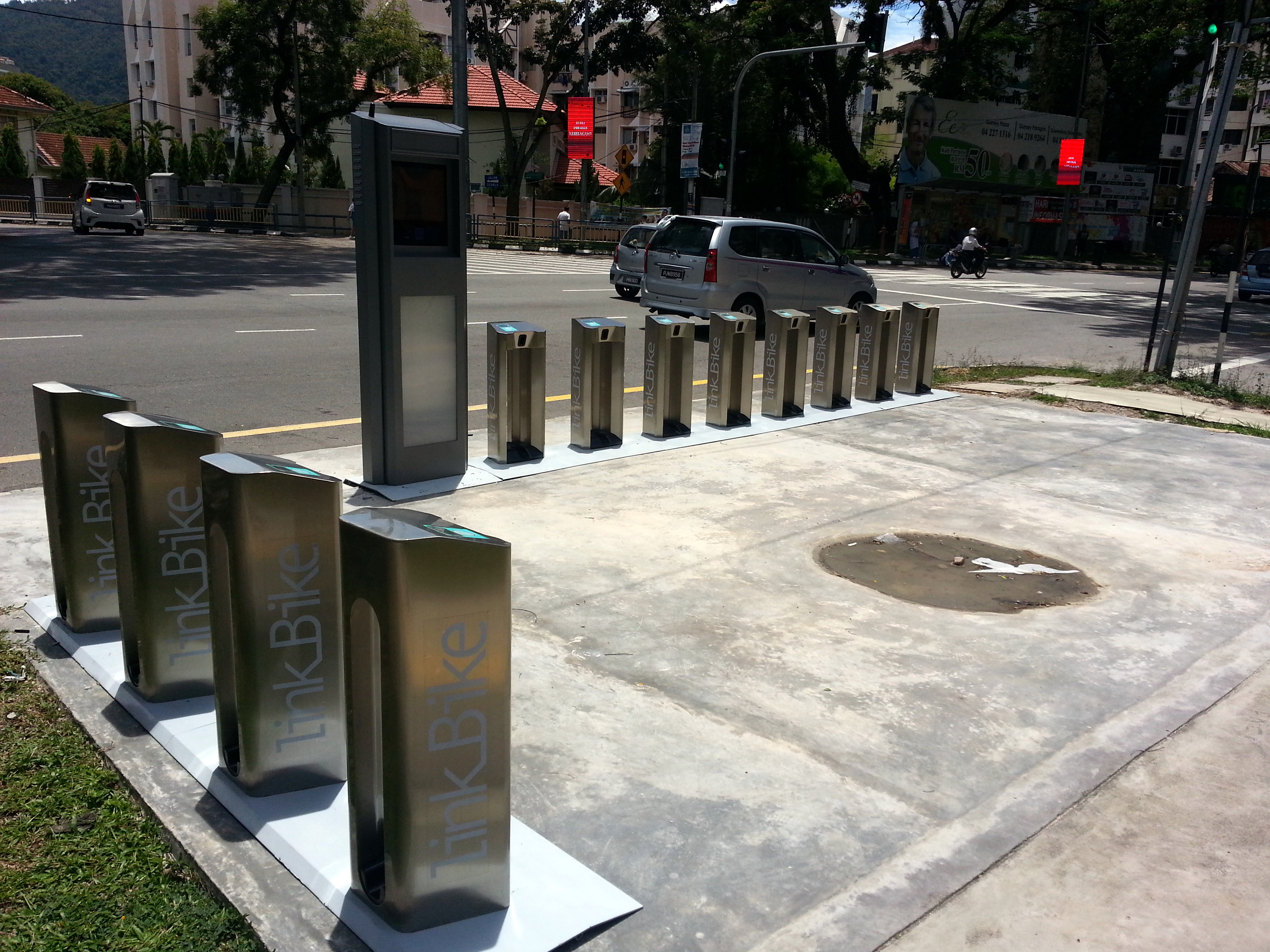
The Kelawei Road LinkBike station, installed in April 2017.

== Technology ==
LinkBike utilises two electronic rental payment methods - the smart card and the smartphone application. The smartphone app is designed as a QR code scanner and comes with a location-based GPS feature that indicates the nearest LinkBike stations, as well as the number of available bicycles at any particular station updated in real time.

Meanwhile, LinkBike's smart card can be topped up using either cash or credit card at LinkBike's office at the Esplanade.

Each LinkBike bicycle has been fitted with an LED-powered dynamo hub that lights up the bicycle's front and rear once motion is detected; this is intended to improve the visibility and safety of riders at night.

== Pricing ==
The first 30 minutes of each ride is free-of-charge, after which a fee of RM1 is imposed for every subsequent hour.

Users can also purchase daily, weekly, monthly or annual passes, ranging from RM2 for 24 hours to RM30 for a one-year pass.

== Stations ==
As of August 2017, 25 LinkBike stations have been installed within and around George Town, including 12 throughout the city's UNESCO World Heritage Site. Each station has either 10 or 12 bicycle parking docks.

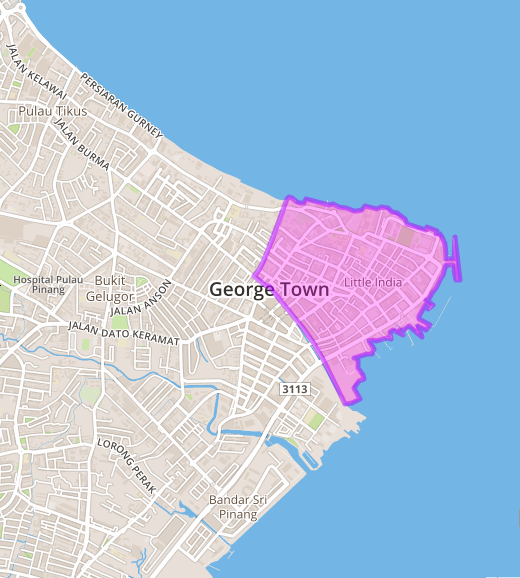
LinkBike stations in George Town as of August 2017. The city centre's UNESCO World Heritage Site is marked in purple.
LinkBike stations on a map of Penang as of August 2017.

== See also ==
- Cycling in Penang Island
- List of bicycle-sharing systems
