= The Cove, Penang =

Condominiums in George Town, Penang, Malaysia

The Cove
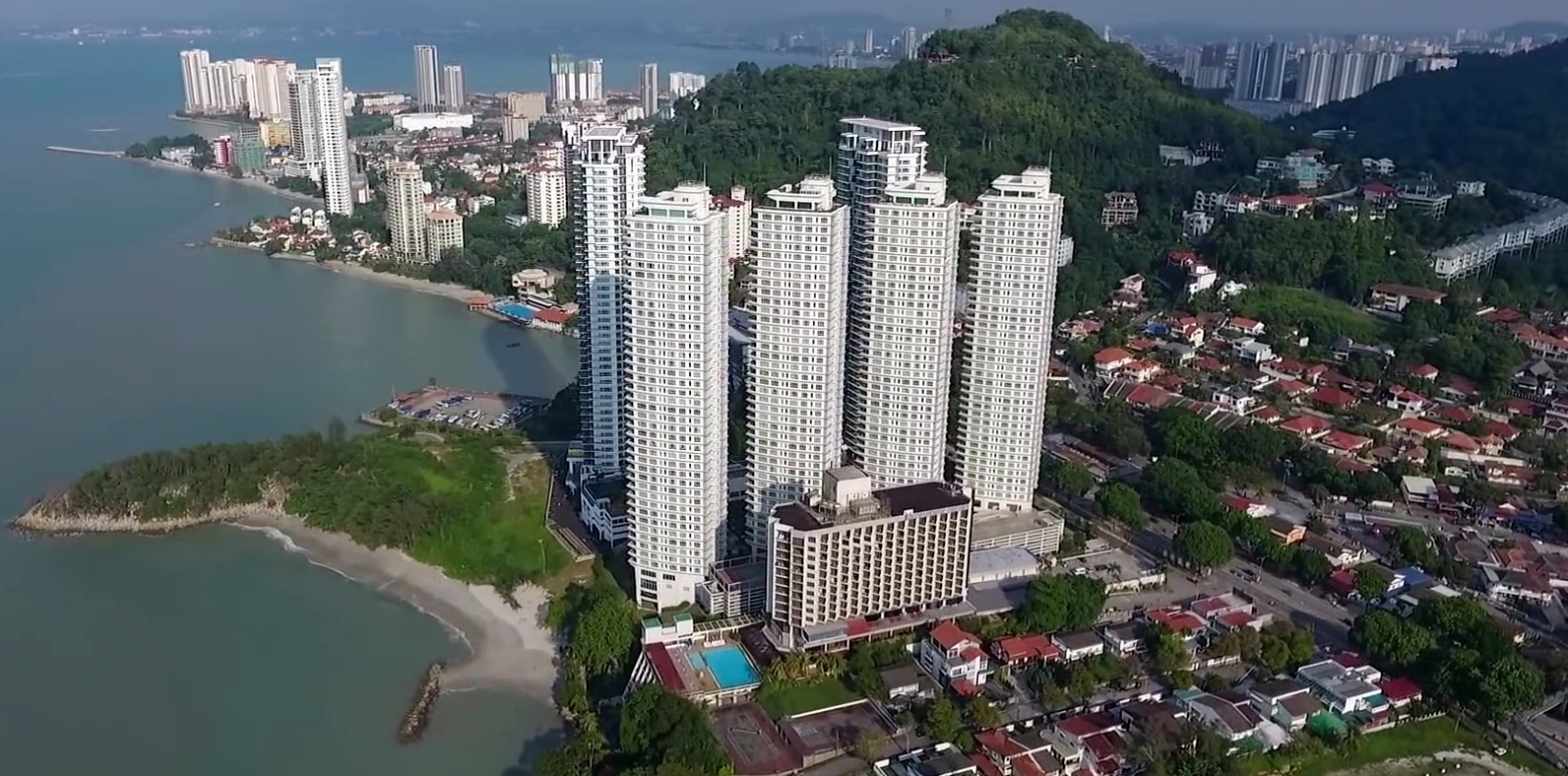
- The Cove consists of four condominiums, with Towers A, B, C and D in the foreground.

- Location within George Town in Penang

General information
- Type: Condominiums
- Location: Jalan Tanjong Bungah, 11200 Tanjong Bungah, George Town, Penang, Malaysia, George Town, Penang, Malaysia
- Coordinates: 5.465892°N 100.292247°E
- Completed: 2007
- Owner: City Associates Group

Height
- Roof: A: 158 m (518 ft) B: 158 m (518 ft); C: 158 m (518 ft); D: 158 m (518 ft); E: 166 m (545 ft) F: 166 m (545 ft)
- Top floor: A: 40 B: 40; C: 40; D: 40; E: 42 F: 42

Technical details
- Floor count: A: 40 B: 40; C: 40; D: 40; E: 42 F: 42

The Cove is a residential complex within George Town in the Malaysian state of Penang. Located at the suburb of Tanjong Bungah, it consists of Towers A, B, C and D.

All four blocks were developed by City Associates Group, a local private limited firm.

== History ==
Initially, Towers A, B, C and D were built in 2007. Each of these towers contains 40 storeys which house 160 units and has a height of approximately 158 m (518 ft).

Next door the One Tanjong project was completed in 2015 and is sometimes incorrectly referred to as "Towers E and F" of The Cove. The newer towers are slightly taller, with each 42-storey block having a height of about 166 m (545 ft).

== See also ==
- List of tallest buildings in George Town
- Tanjung Bungah
