= Penang Floating Mosque =

Mosque in Northeast, Penang, Malaysia

- Masjid Terapung Pulau Pinang مسجد تراڤوڠ ڤولاو ڤينڠ
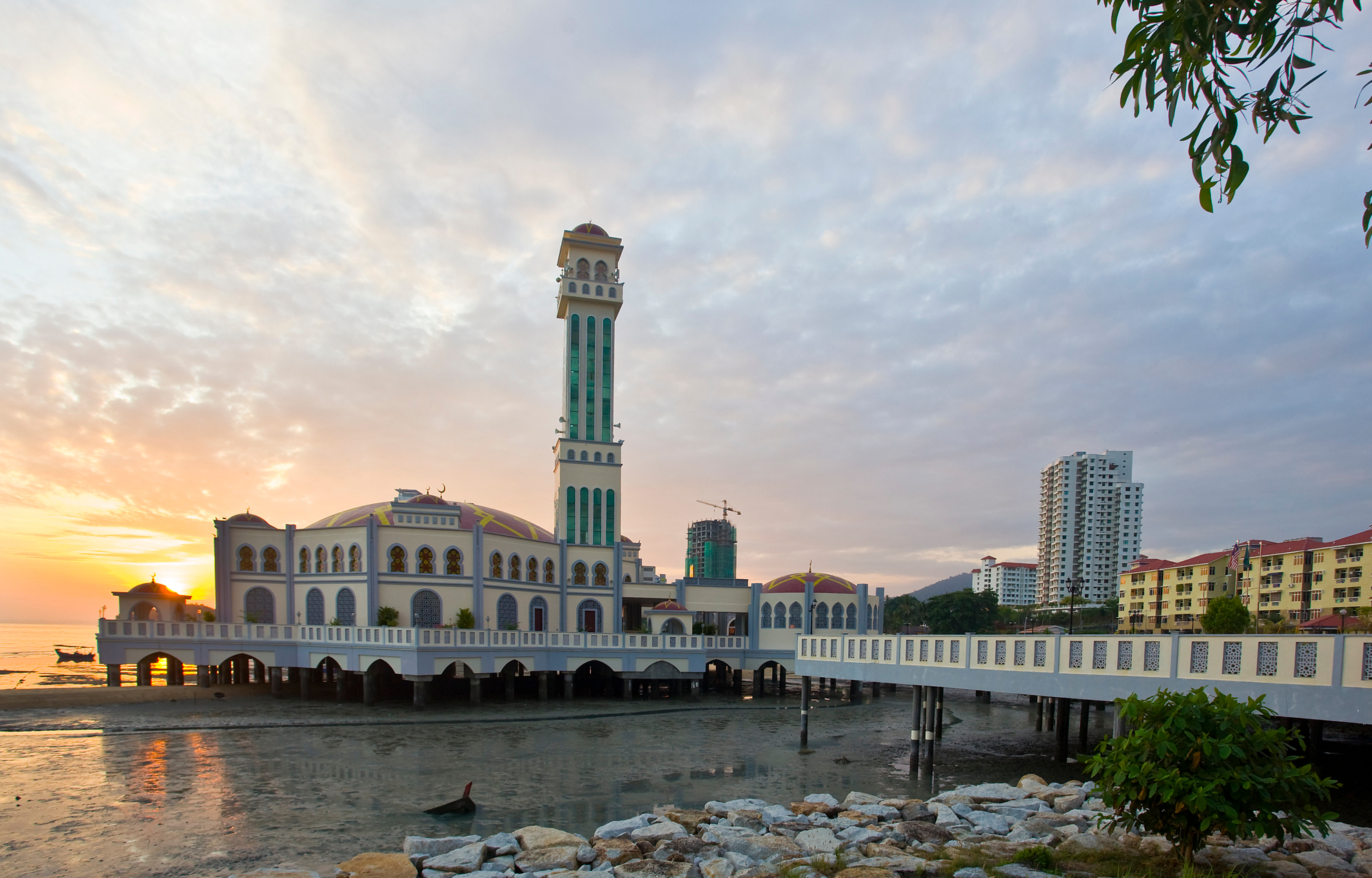

- Location within George Town, Penang

Religion
- Affiliation: Islam
- Branch/tradition: Sunni

Location
- Location: Tanjong Bungah
- Municipality: George Town
- State: Penang
- Country: Malaysia
- Interactive map of Penang Floating Mosque
- Coordinates: 5°28′07.2″N 100°16′41.9″E

Architecture
- Type: mosque
- Established: 16 March 2007
- Groundbreaking: 2003

The Penang Floating Mosque (Malay: Masjid Terapung Pulau Pinang), also known as Tanjong Bungah Floating Mosque (Malay: Masjid Terapung Tanjong Bungah) is a mosque within the city of George Town in the Malaysian state of Penang.

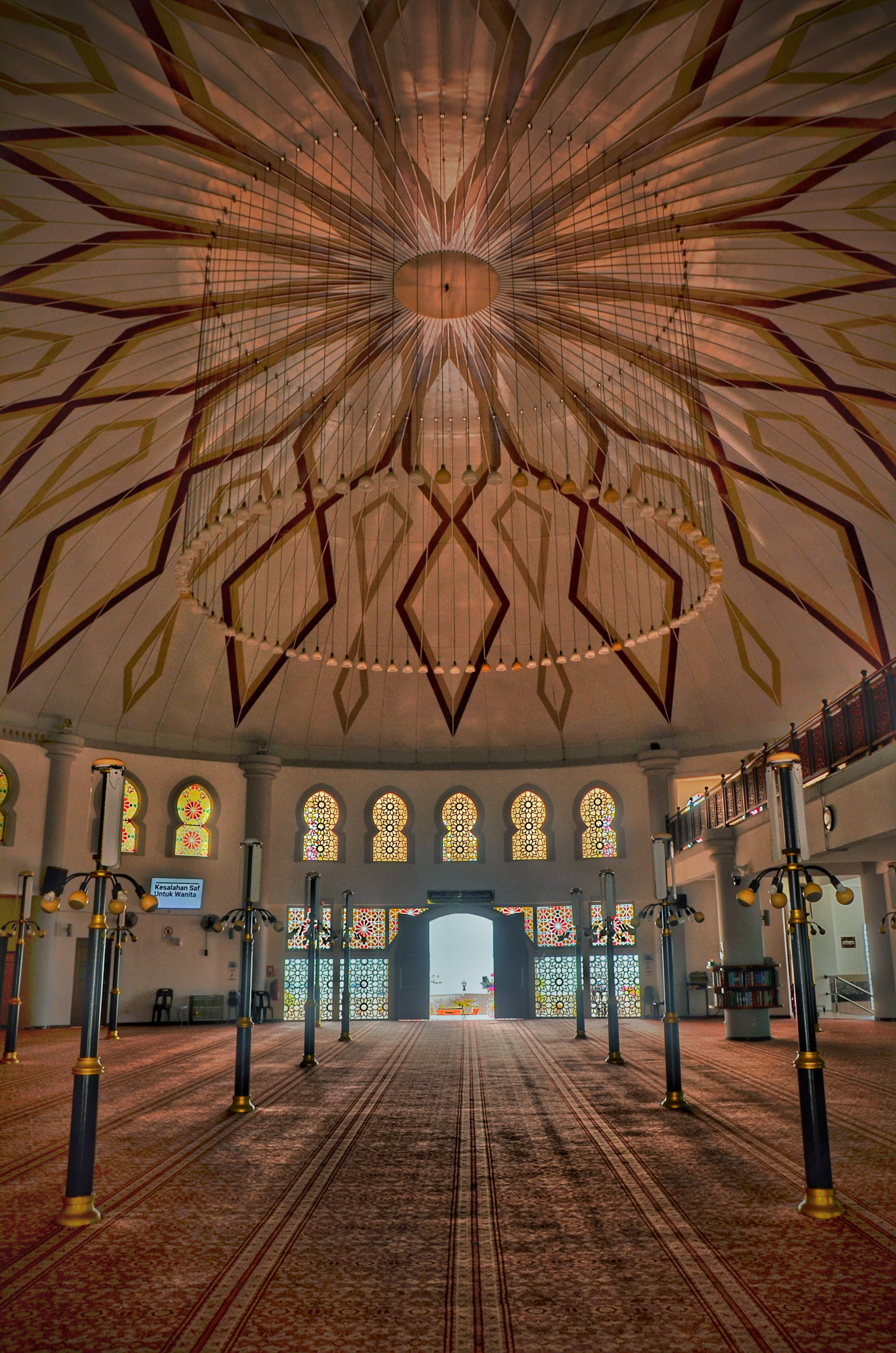
Mosque interior

== History ==
A small mosque was first built at Tanjong Bungah in 1967 and it was expanded in In 1977 so that it may accommodate 500 worshipers. With increasing population, it soon became too small for the local Muslim community, but with limited land to expand, an idea was then proposed to build the mosque on the sea. The construction of the new mosque started in 2003, and cost RM15 million to build. It was first opened to the public in January 2005. It was officially opened on 16 March 2007 by the fifth Malaysian Prime Minister, Datuk Seri Abdullah Ahmad Badawi.

== Features ==
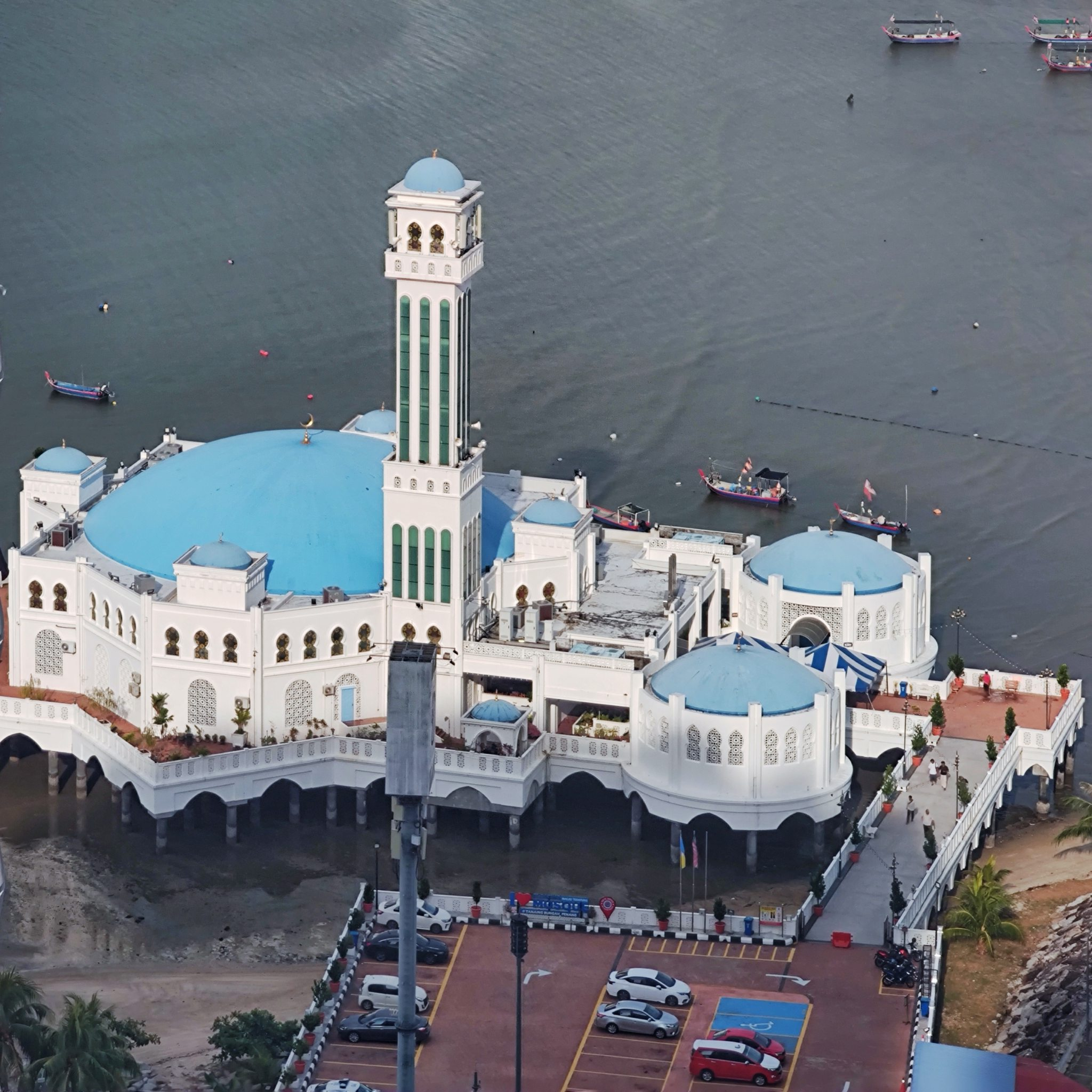
Aerial view of the Penang Floating Mosque

Although it is called a floating mosque, the mosque is actually built on stilts, only at high tide would it have the appearance of floating on water. It is built in a mix of Middle Eastern and local architectural style and features a prominent minaret. The mosque can accommodate 1,500 worshipers.

== See also ==
- Tengku Tengah Zaharah Mosque, Floating Mosque of Kuala Terengganu
- Islam in Malaysia
