= Cove Pond =

Coordinates: 18°10′15″N 63°08′13″W

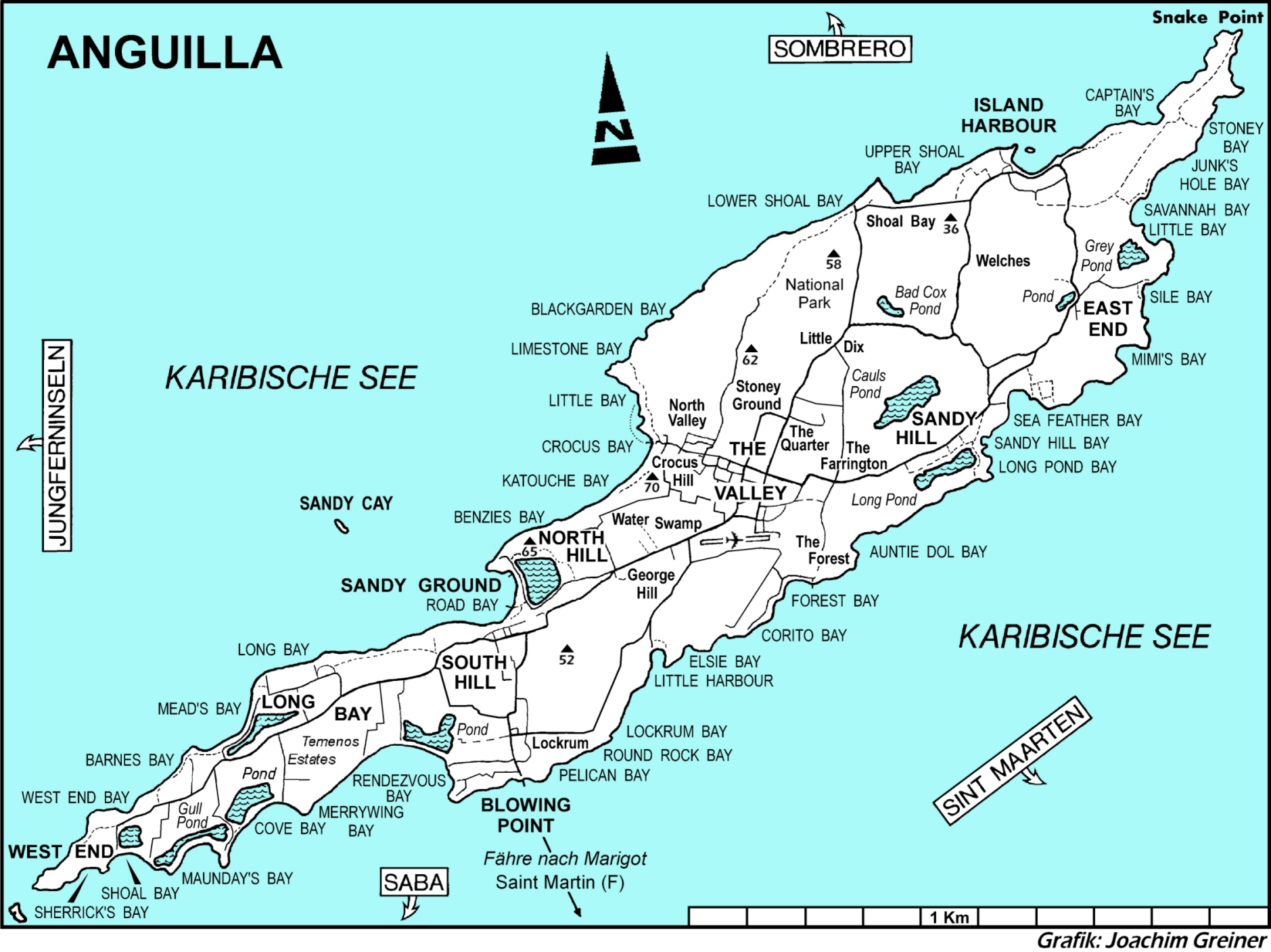
Map of Anguilla

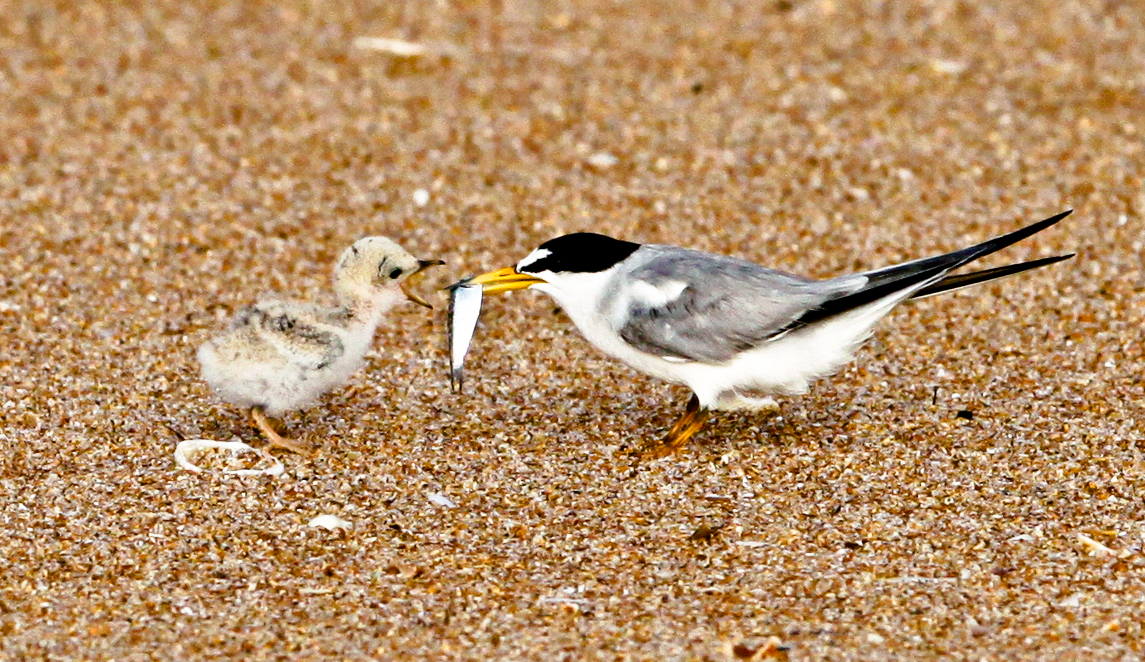
The wetland is an important breeding site for least terns

Cove Pond is a shallow 287 ha wetland at the south-western end of the Caribbean island of Anguilla, a British Overseas Territory. It forms part of a larger coastal lagoon from which it is separated by a causeway constructed for access to the Cap Juluca resort.

== Important Bird Area ==
The wetland has been identified as an Important Bird Area by BirdLife International because it provides nesting, resting, and feeding habitat for over 40 bird species, including a breeding colony of least terns and wintering common terns. Snowy and piping plovers have been recorded, as have the green-throated carib and the Lesser Antillean bullfinch.
