= Coving (urban planning) =

Method of suburban planning

Coving is a method of suburban planning used in subdivision and redevelopment of cities characterized by organic lot shapes and home placement along meandering setbacks. It is an improved rediscovery of the platting designs employed by such cities as Shaker Heights, Ohio. When combined with a new form of street patterns, lot area is increased and road area and length is reduced – a demonstrated average 25% compared to conventional suburban platting. Coving is used as an alternative to conventional urban "grid" and suburban land development layouts to enhance curb appeal, eliminate monotony, reduce costs, such as road surfacing and street length, while increasing the amount of land available for construction. Coving is unique because it gains its efficiency by increasing instead of decreasing existing regulatory minimums.

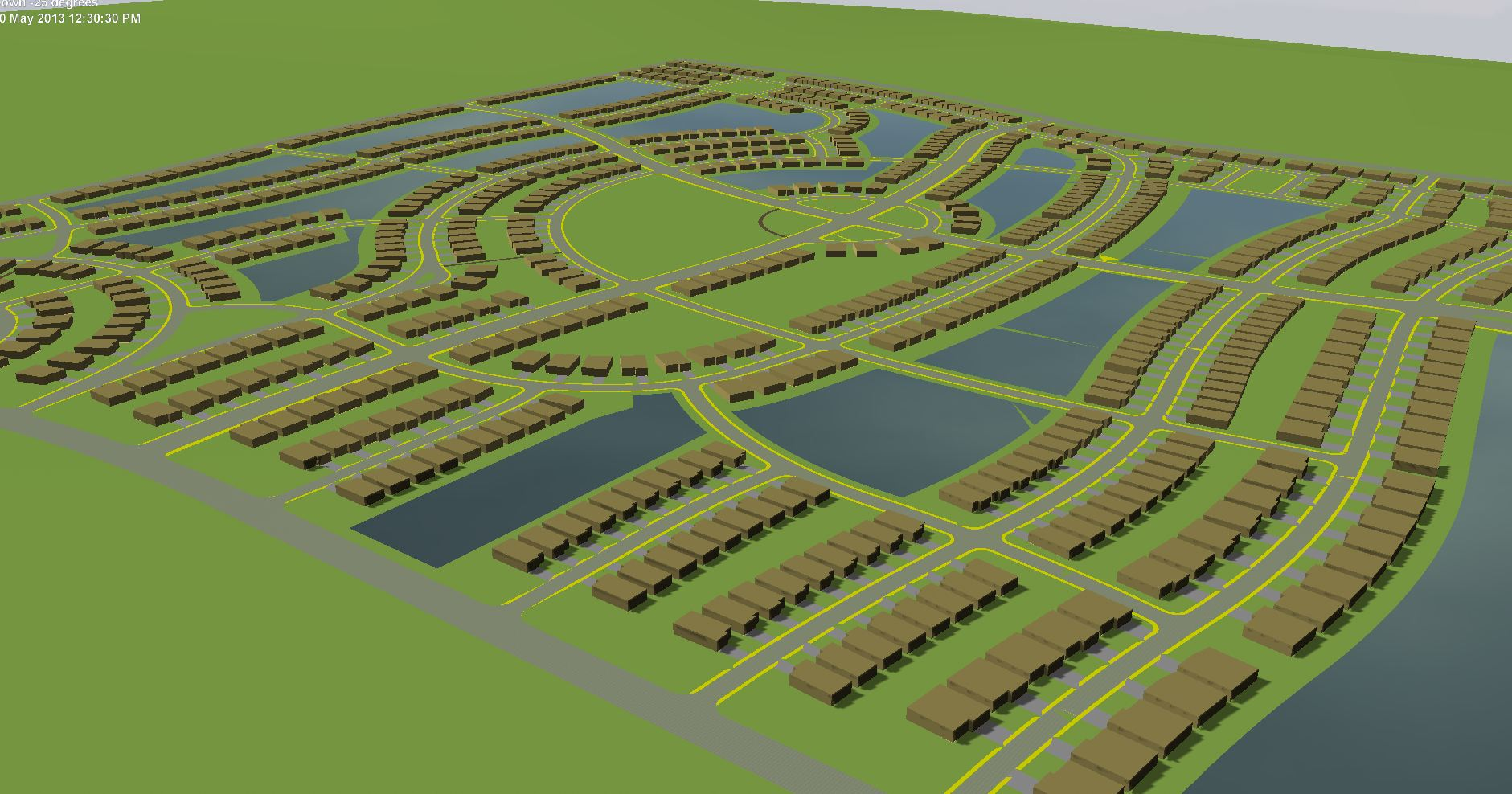
A conventional land development using TND planning methods

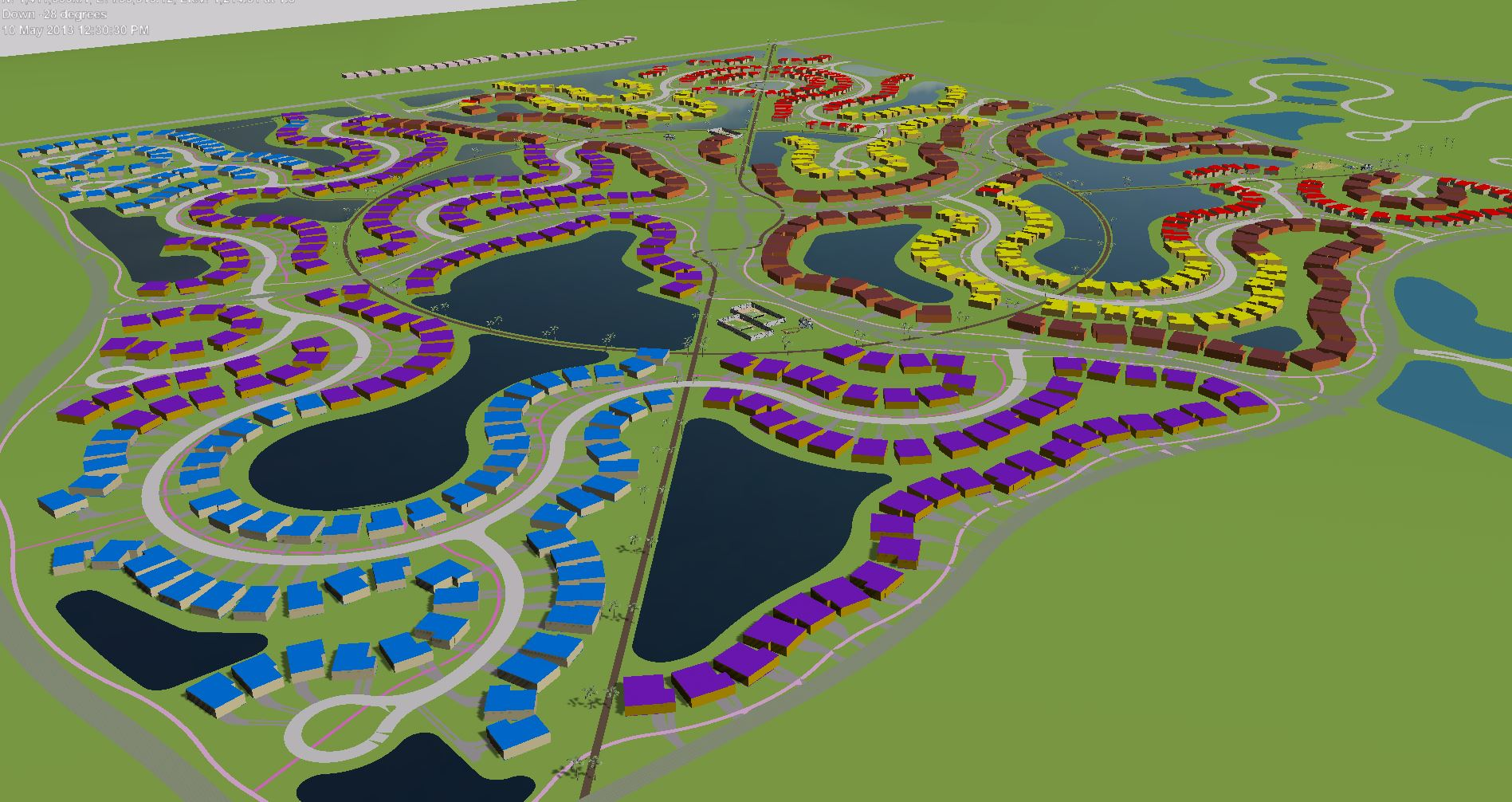
A Coved land development plan using 4th generation design and principals of Prefurbia

== History ==
Coving was pioneered by Minneapolis-based urban designer Rick Harrison. His design intent was that no two houses look directly into each other's windows. The name comes from coves of green spaces among the homes which are made possible by winding roads and meandering setbacks.

Coving was first discovered by accident when Rick Harrison was experimenting with design options on a Chicago subdivision layout in 1990. By the meandering of setbacks and the elimination of pavement bubbles running the calculations through Land Innovation software it was discovered that street pavement was reduced 20%. Assuming it was a software error, the site was manually checked. He had discovered that by carefully meandering the homes to form curved shapes separate from the direction of the street, there could be a significant reduction in street length. Coving has led to many new discoveries and pioneering design methods and techniques as well as new software technologies and user interfaces. Currently Coving is in its fourth generation, and has demonstrated an average reduction of public street length by 25% while maintaining density of conventional (curved street) subdivision platting. More recently in 2013, advancements in architecture were made possible by the lot shaping and open space interconnection with living spaces within the home – redefining architecture and land planning.

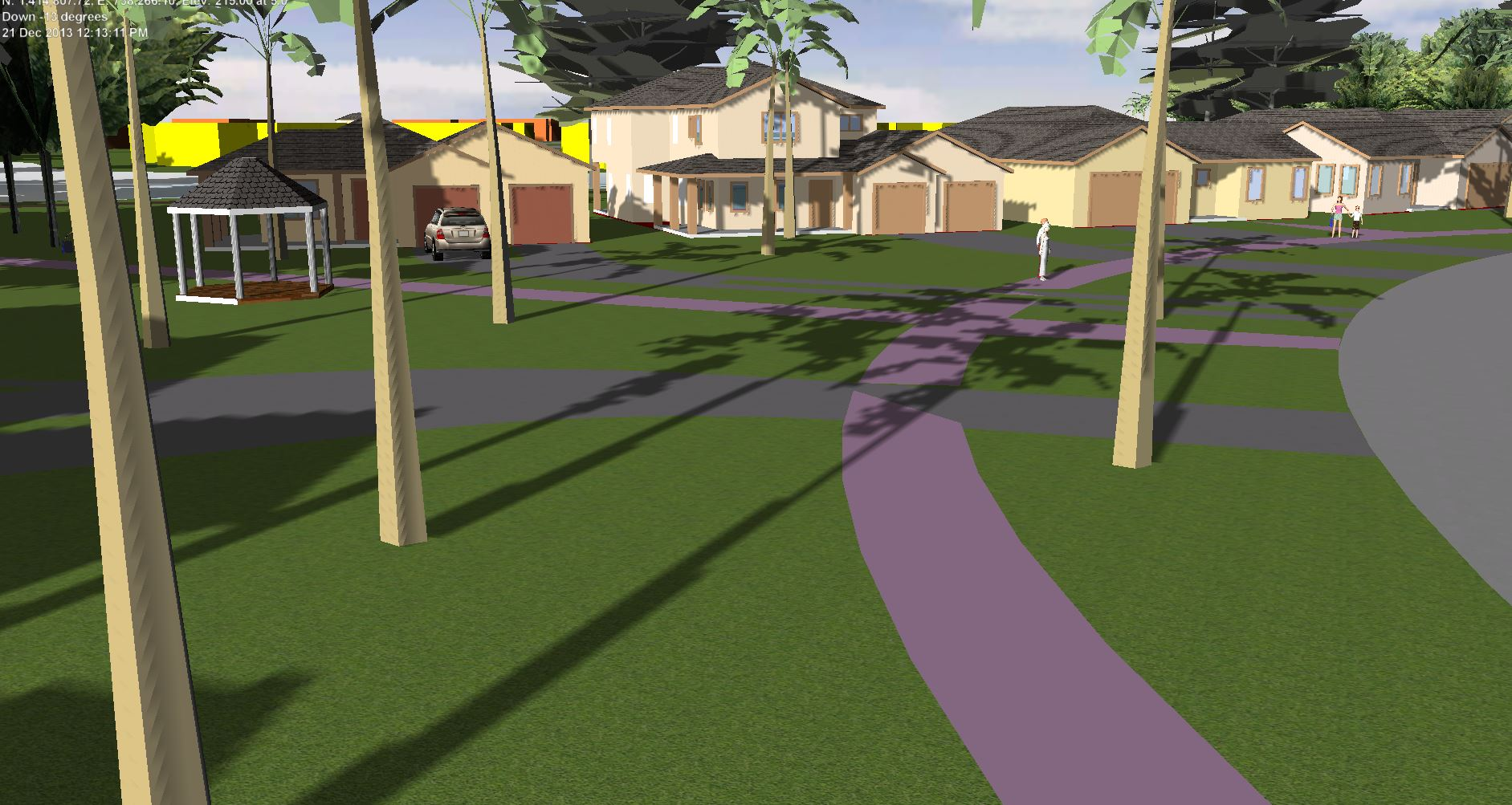
A Coved Streetscape with homes using architectural shaping and blending in Viera Florida

Another area where coved design has made advancement is in the realm of Urban Redevelopment. By abandoning excessive streets and right-of-ways a demonstrated reduction of public street of upwards of 60% can redefine how inner core suburban (typically tight gridded lots) are redeveloped. This model was first created at the beginning of the 2008 recession and is being proposed in blighted urban spaces to bring about housing affordability and increased quality of life.

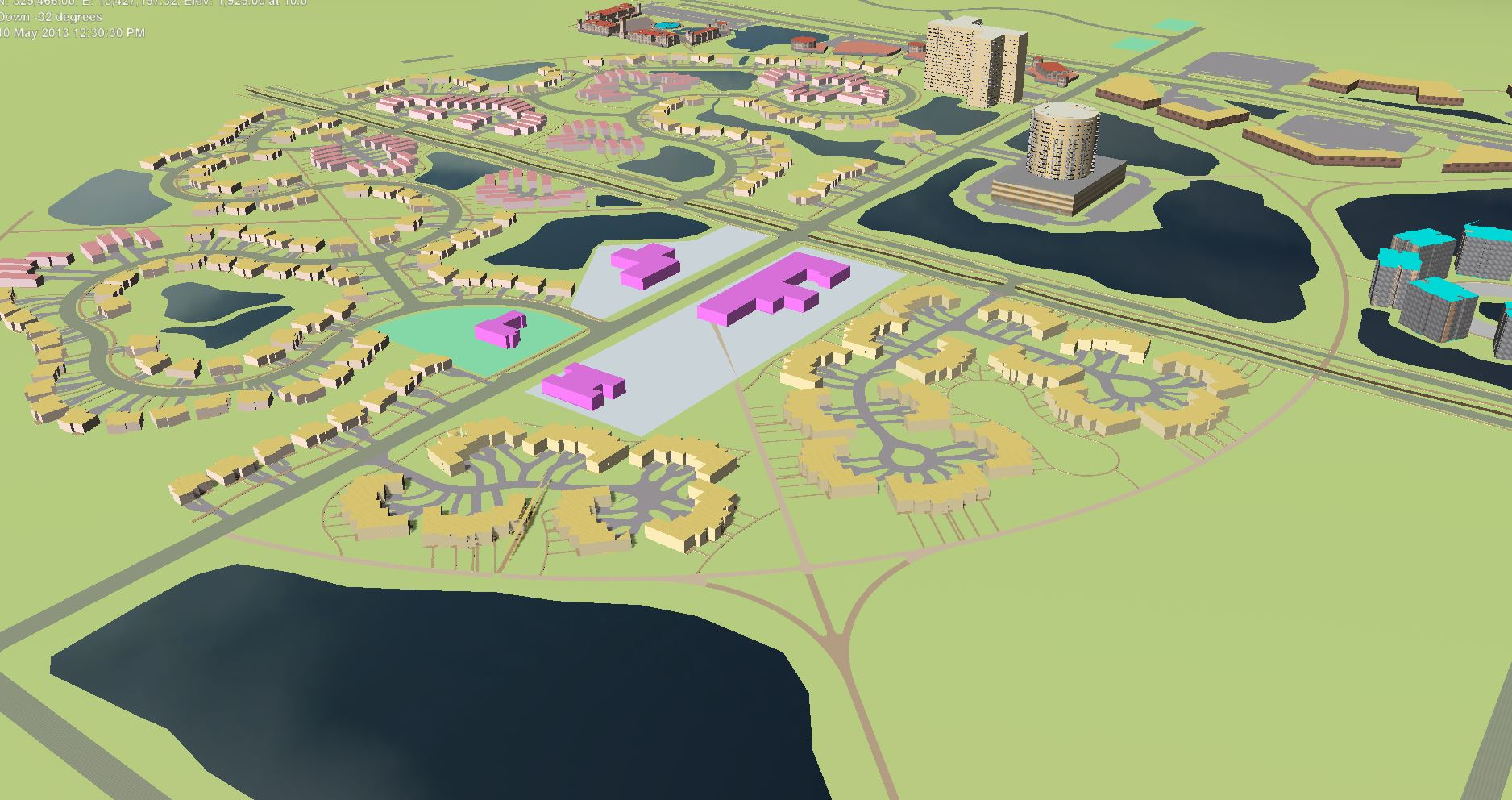
A redevelopment plan with elements of coving proposed for Detroit

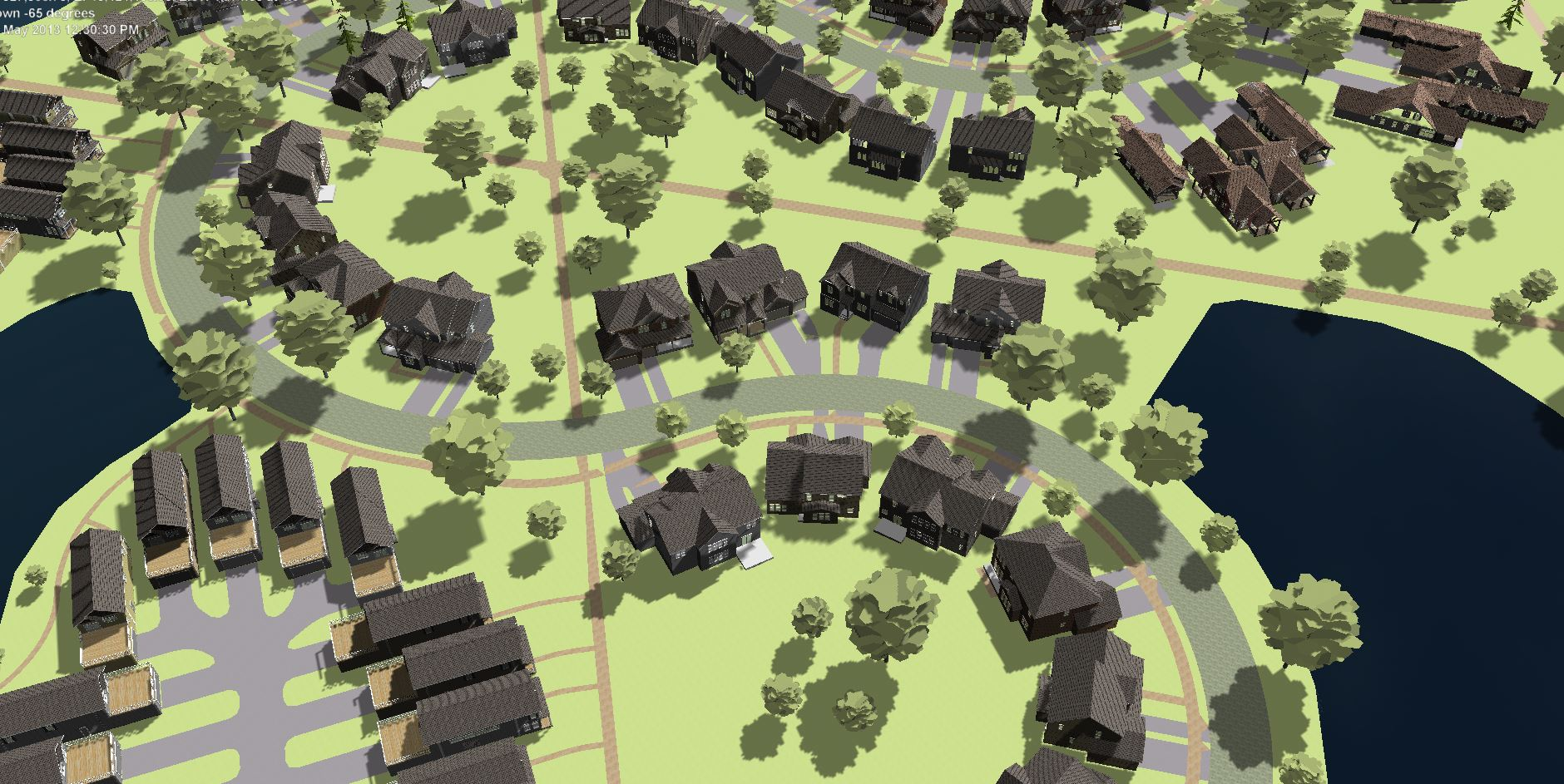
A Redevelopment example of Coving used for a Detroit proposal

== Advantages and disadvantages ==
A coved layout reduces construction costs by reducing roadway length, thereby lowering paving and utility-line costs. The reduction in road surface adds usable land for lots and parks. Other benefits are increased pedestrian safety due to less road and fewer intersections. Individual properties also gain aesthetic value from the separate meandering setback lines, sidewalks, and roadways. Very early coved design (first generation) were somewhat experimental with potential problems:

Coving has been cited as having several disadvantages: greater set-back from the street, larger lots, reduced usability for mixed application, decreased walkability, decreased street and pedestrian connectivity of a tract to its surroundings, increased suburban sprawl, leaving little or no public open space, and allowing more soil runoff and less communal open space than alternate development types such as new urbanism.

In an effort to eliminate any negative elements of the design, research was done to visit early coved sites and query both residents and cities to revise and update the design methods. Along with receiving comments from land developers and builders, coved design had gone through 4 iterations of evolution. Today's coved designs have better vehicular flow reducing energy and time in transit, direct and connective pedestrian systems with safer and elegant meandering walks, as well as curve radii standards that reduce excessive infrastructure of early designs. These comparisons are for traditional curved subdivision designs as well as the New Urbanism or smart growth methods of planning. In the top two images on this page, the before TND, or Smart Growth design has 54 street intersections and 38% more street length than the coved design of the same housing mix and density. The coved plan has much better walking connectivity and is far safer with less interaction between vehicles and people. More important is that the average lot size increases 15% and monotony is eliminated. As with all coved development, the design methods accomplish all of this and more by exceeding every existing regulatory minimum. Coved development is unique in all of land planning in that it actually gains efficiency by exceeding existing regulatory minimums, it is the first method of design with such a claim to boast. What this means is there is nothing special to request for approvals - the design exceeds the regulatory minimums.
