= Dalat International School =

Coordinates: 5°28′01.6″N 100°17′23.1″E

Location
- Tanjung Bunga; Penang, 11200; Malaysia

Information
- Type: Private boarding school
- Motto: Education for Life
- Religious affiliation: Christian
- Established: 1929
- Founder: Hazel A. Jackson
- Director: Shawna Wood, Head of School; Dr. Tressa White, Deputy Head of School
- Principal: Lizzy Neiger (K-4); Beverly Stevens (5-8); Scott Uzzle (9-12)
- Faculty: 75
- Grades: PS-12
- Gender: Coeducational
- Campus: Suburban (beachside)
- Colours: Blue and Gold
- Athletics conference: ACSC (Asian Christian Schools Conference) and MSSPP in Malaysia
- Mascot: Florence the Eagle
- Accreditation: ACSI; WASC
- Yearbook: Reflector
- Affiliations: EARCOS and Association of International Malaysian Schools(AIMS)
- Athletic Director: Brendan Van Rensburg
- Website: www.dalat.org

Dalat International School is a private boarding school in Penang, Malaysia. Founded as a boarding school for children of missionaries in Southeast Asia, it has grown into an international school with a diverse student population. AT the beginning of the 2017-2018 school year, there were 650 students representing 28 countries. It is one of eleven schools on the island and the only one offering an American curriculum.

== History ==
Dalat School was founded in 1929 as a private Christian boarding school in Dalat, Vietnam to provide a North American elementary and high school education for children of Christian and Missionary Alliance (C&MA) missionaries in Indochina. In 1962, Reverend Archie E. Mitchell, who was on staff at the school with his wife Betty, was abducted by Viet Cong guerrillas. As the Vietnam War escalated, in 1965, the teachers and staff were evacuated by the USAF to Bangkok, Thailand. During this period, the school was located in the American Club on Wireless Road, which is across the street from the US Ambassador's residence. Eight months later, the school relocated to Tanah Rata in the Cameron Highlands of Malaysia where it remained for six years.
