= Metrorower =

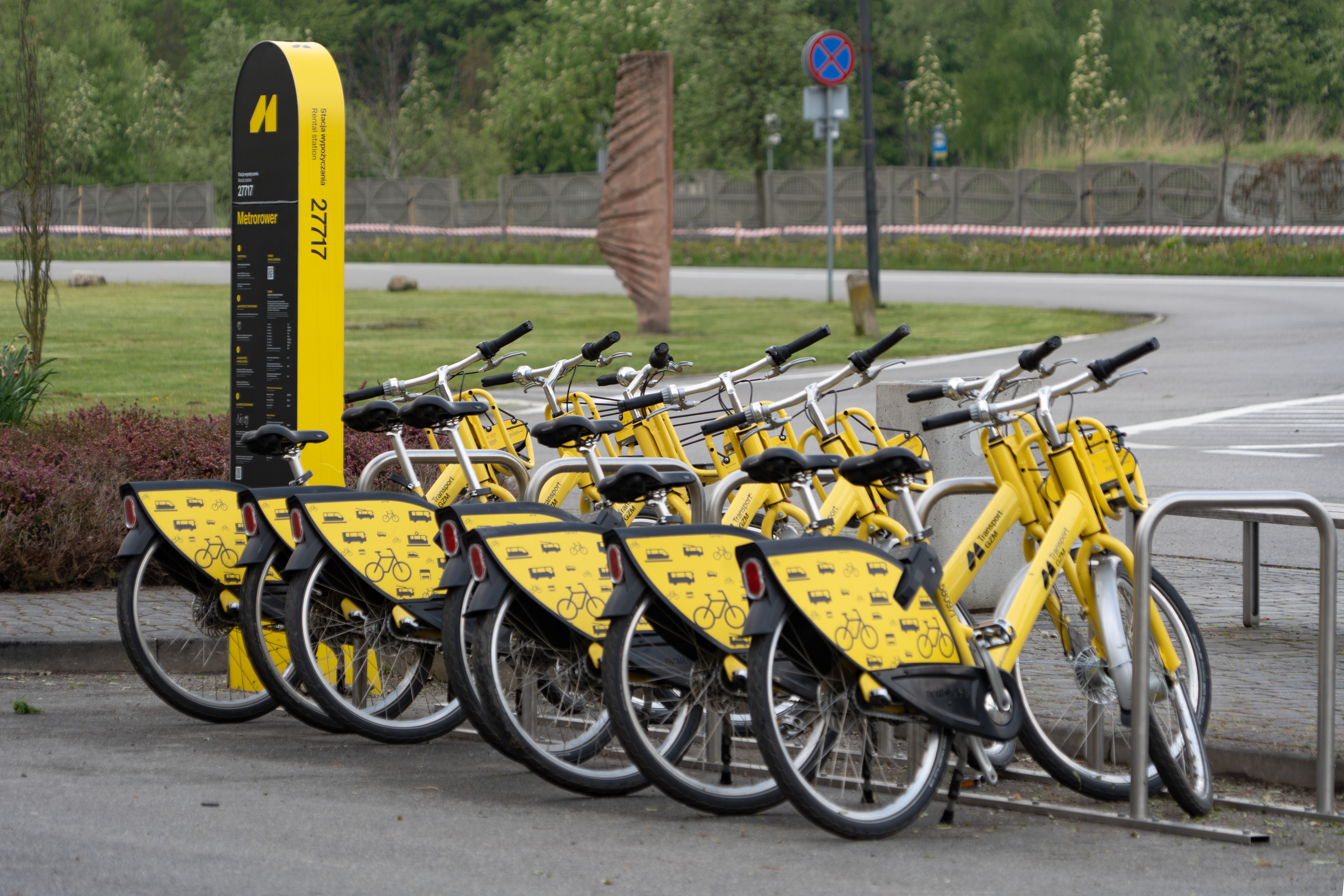
- Metrobike station in the Valley of Three Ponds in Katowice

Overview
- Locale: Metropolis GZM
- Number of stations: 924
- Website: https://metrorower.transportgzm.pl/en/

Operation
- Operator: Nextbike
- Number of vehicles: 7000

Metrorower (Metrobike) is a year-round public bicycle-sharing system in the Metropolis GZM (Silesian Voivodeship) in Poland. It was launched on 25 February 2024 and is operated by Nextbike. The system consists of 942 stations and 7054 bicycles, which makes it the largest in Poland and the third-largest in Europe. It is available in and connects 40 out of 41 municipalities of the GZM Metropolis, including Katowice, Gliwice, Chorzów, Sosnowiec, Dąbrowa Górnicza and 35 others.

== History ==
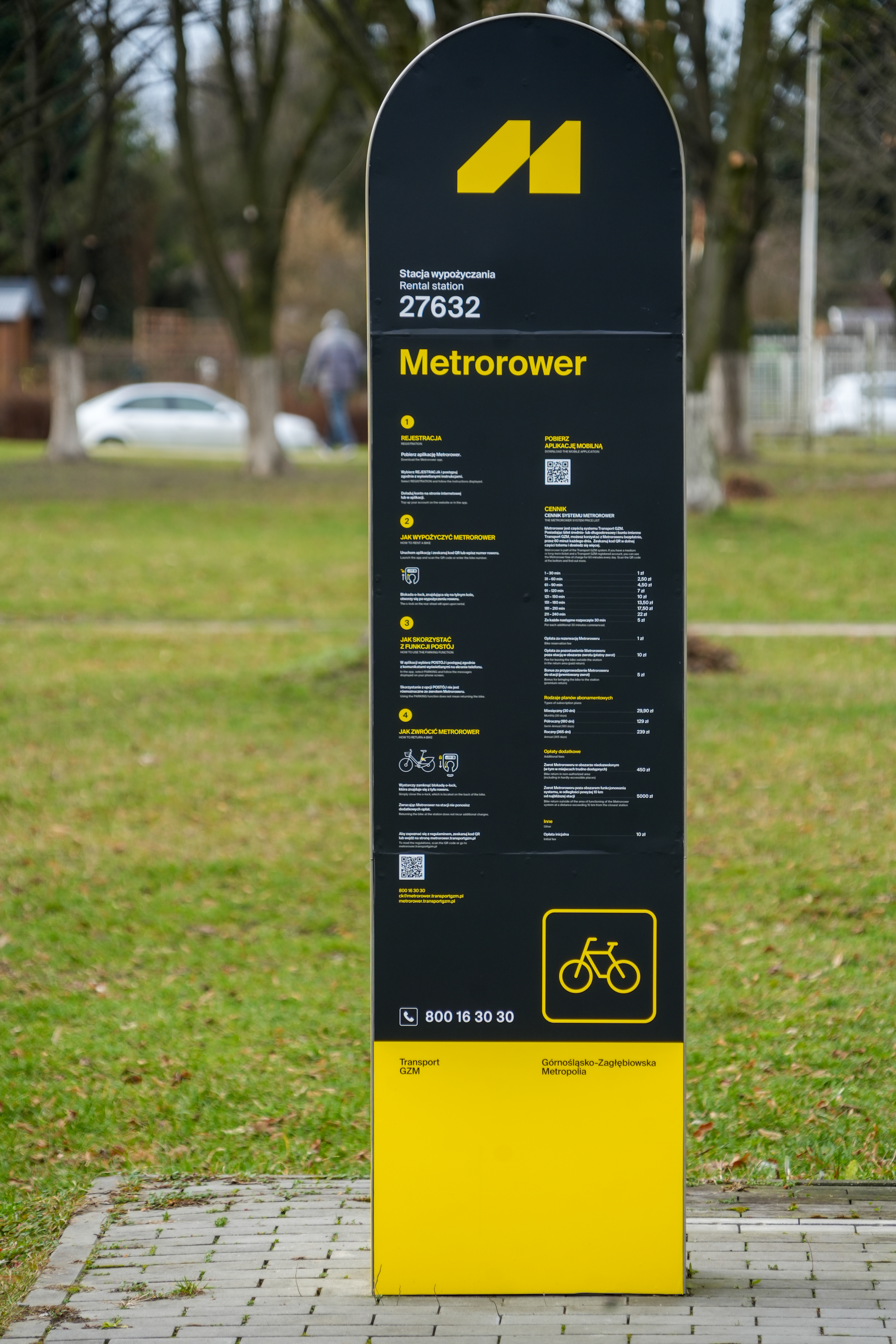
Information totem at one of the stations

At the time of the establishment of the Metropolis GZM (1 July 2017), there were three city bike systems operating in its area: Gliwicki Rower Miejski, City by bike in Katowice and Tyski Rower, and Sosnowiec had signed a contract for the supply of bicycles and stations. In 2018, the following were also launched: Kajteroz in Chorzów, Siemianowicki Rower Miejski, Sosnowiecki Rower Miejski, Świętochłowicki Rower Miejski, and Zabrzański Rower Miejski.

Despite the fact that the operator of all systems was Nextbike, the regulations of individual systems prohibited returning bikes outside the city of rental. In order to solve this problem, GZM signed an agreement with Nextbike integrating the existing systems managed by it. The agreement covered only standard bicycles and assumed that the cost of relocation of bicycles between cities would be covered by the Metropolis. The agreement covered systems in Chorzów, Gliwice, Katowice, Tychy, Siemianowice Śląskie, Sosnowiec and Zabrze.

In 2020, a second operator of city bikes, Roovee, appeared in GZM, which first took over the operation of city bikes in Zabrze in 2020 and in Gliwice in 2021, and then launched the system in Czeladź in 2021. The agreement integrating the city bike systems did not cover those managed by this operator. In 2022, Chorzów decided to upgrade its bikes, making them incompatible with bikes from neighboring cities. Thus, the agreement integrating systems in different cities has also ceased to be in force.

=== Concept ===
In parallel with the work on the integration of the existing city bike systems, the Metropolis GZM worked on its own system, which resulted in the fact that on 25 March 2019 it announced a tender for the implementation of the concept of the Electric Metropolitan Bike. However, this tender did not end with the signing of the contract, so on 17 December the Metropolis announced a tender for the implementation of the concept of the "Metropolitan Bike". As a result, in July 2020, a contract was signed with DS Consulting for the development of this concept. The concept, developed by DS Consulting, was published in January 2021 in the GZM Public Information Bulletin.

=== Proceedings ===
On 28 May 2021, the Metropolis GZM announced a competitive dialogue procedure for the Launch, management and operation of the Metropolitan Bike System in the GZM.. Applications to participate in the procedure were submitted by 2 companies: CityBike GlobalQ and Nextbike GZM, and on April 6, 2022, the phase of talks with them began.

On March 7, 2023, the deadline for submitting bids under the second stage of the procedure expired. The offer was submitted only by Nextbike GZM with a gross value of PLN 331 million and on 28 August this offer was selected, and on 25 October the contract was signed. The contract was concluded for a period of 59 months and assumed a 3-stage implementation of the system.

=== Functioning ===
On October 31, 2023, the official presentation of the metrobike took place in Katowice with the participation of the chairman of GZM Kazimierz Karolczak and the president of Nextbike Tomasz Wojtkiewicz. In the second half of January, the assembly of the first stage station began. On 26 January, GZM made an auto-amendment to its budget, so that the first stage of the implementation of the Metrorower could cover an additional – 8th city (Chorzów). On February 16, a closed test run of the system began. On 23 February, the GZM assembly adopted a resolution enabling the acceleration of the implementation of the second and third phases of the Metrorower for the turn of July and August 2024.

On February 25, 2024, the system was launched with 276 stations in 8 cities (Chorzów, Czeladź, Gliwice, Katowice, Siemianowice Śląskie, Sosnowiec, Tychy and Zabrze) and 1860 bicycles. At the end of July 2024, the operator began launching additional stations and delivering additional bikes. On 1 August, the system was expanded to 31 municipalities, 924 stations and 7,000 bicycles, making it the third largest system of its kind in Europe.

== System ==
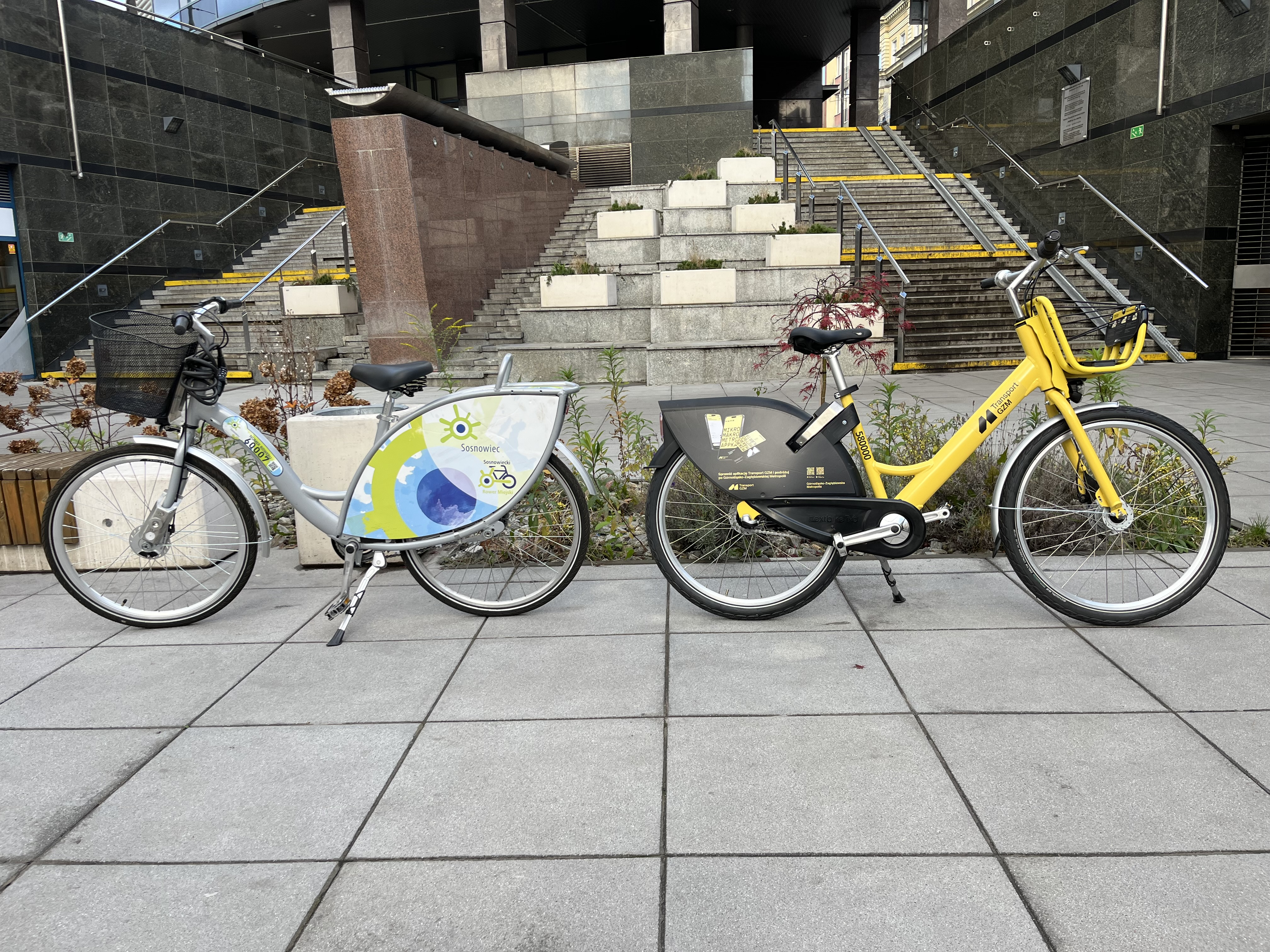
Generation 3 (left) and 4 (right) system bicycle

It is a year-round 4th generation system that does not require the existence of base stations, but in this implementation it has stations just like 3rd generation systems. Returning the bike to the station is not obligatory, but it is rewarded with lower fees. Fees for use are conducted in two modes: per ride (billing for every 30 minutes) or in subscription (monthly, semi-annual, annual). As a complement to the transport offer, GZM has introduced free travel for season ticket holders. Holders of these tickets can use Metrobikes every day for 60 minutes at no additional charge.

The use of the bike is possible using the existing Nextbike applications and through the Transport GZM application.

Participating municipalities – phase 1 Participating municipalities – phase 2 Participating municipalities – phase 3 Other GZM municipalities

=== Stations ===
The system includes 924 stations in 31 out of 41 GZM communes:

- launched in phase 1 on 25 February 2024: in Chorzów, Czeladź, Gliwice, Katowice, Siemianowice Śląskie, Sosnowiec, Tychy, and Zabrze, where it replaced the existing city bike systems,
- launched in phase 2 on 1 August 2024: in Będzin, Bieruń, Bytom, Chełm Śląski, Dąbrowa Górnicza, Gierałtowice, Knurów, Łaziska Górne, Mikołów, Mysłowice, Piekary Śląskie, Pyskowice, Radzionków, Ruda Śląska Rudziniec, Siewierz, Sławków, Świerklaniec, Świętochłowice, Tarnowskie Góry, Wojkowice, Wyry, and Zbrosławice.
- launched in phase 3 on 15 December 2025: in Bobrowniki, Bojszowy, Imielin, Kobiór, Lędziny, Mierzęcice, Pilchowice, Psary and Sośnicowice.

=== Bicycles ===
The system includes 7054 SmartBikes 2.0, i.e. 4th generation bikes equipped with a GPS transmitter and an electric lock, which do not need to be attached to the stands. The metrobike weighs 20.5 kilograms and its electronics are powered by a solar panel placed in a basket.
