= Gliwicki Rower Miejski =

Former bicycle-sharing system in Gliwice, Poland

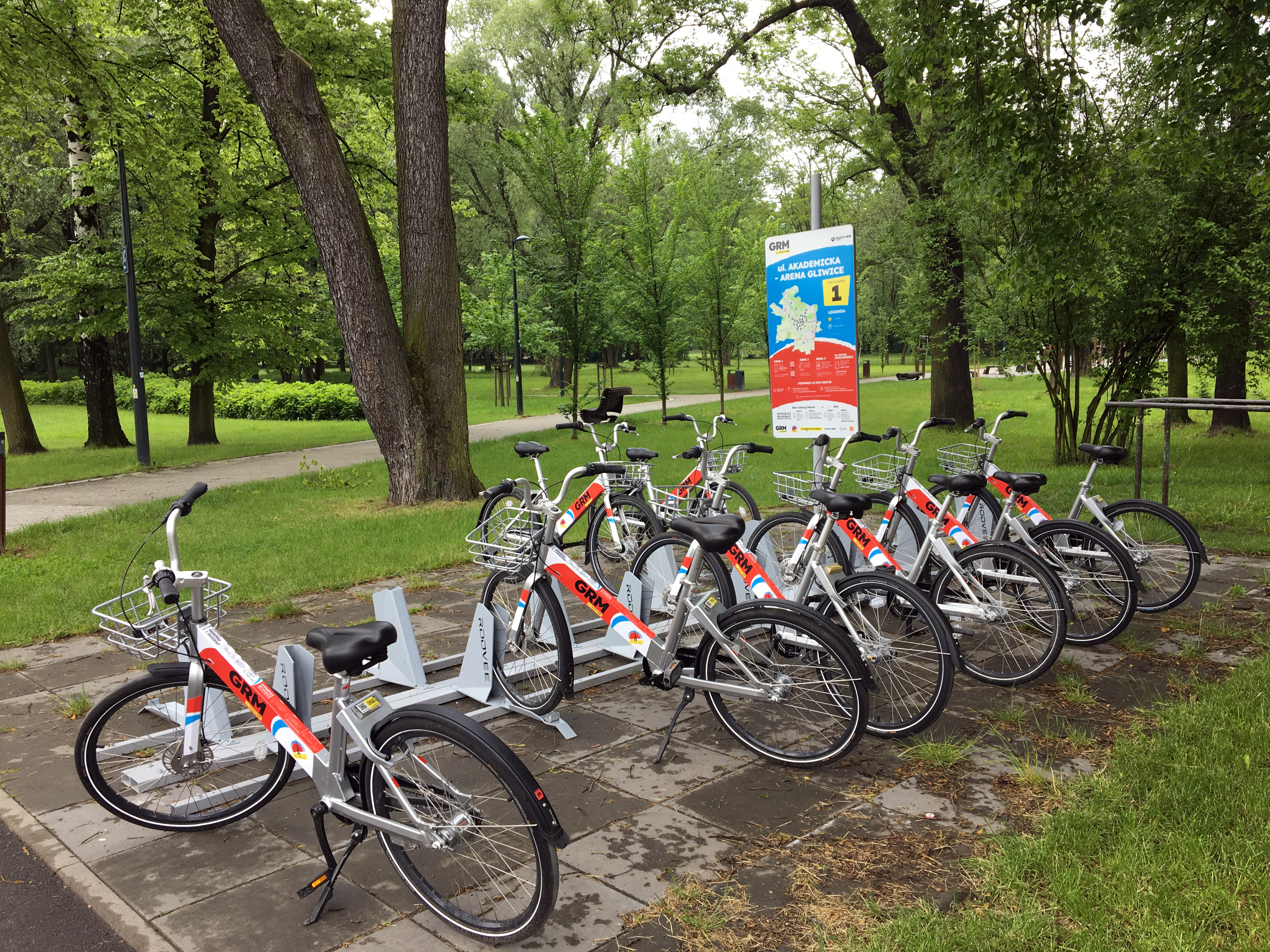
- Gliwicki Rower Miejski station

Overview
- Area served: Gliwice; Poland
- Transit type: bicycle-sharing system
- Number of stations: 36
- Annual ridership: 176,000 (for 2022)

Operation
- Began operation: 2017
- Ended operation: 2022
- Operators: nextbike, Roovee
- Number of vehicles: 350

Gliwicki Rower Miejski (English: Gliwice City Bike) was a bicycle-sharing system in Gliwice that operated from 2017 to 2019 (as a third-generation system managed by nextbike) and from 2021 to 2022 (as a fourth-generation system managed by Roovee). In 2022, the system consisted of 36 unmanned stations and 350 bicycles.

== History ==
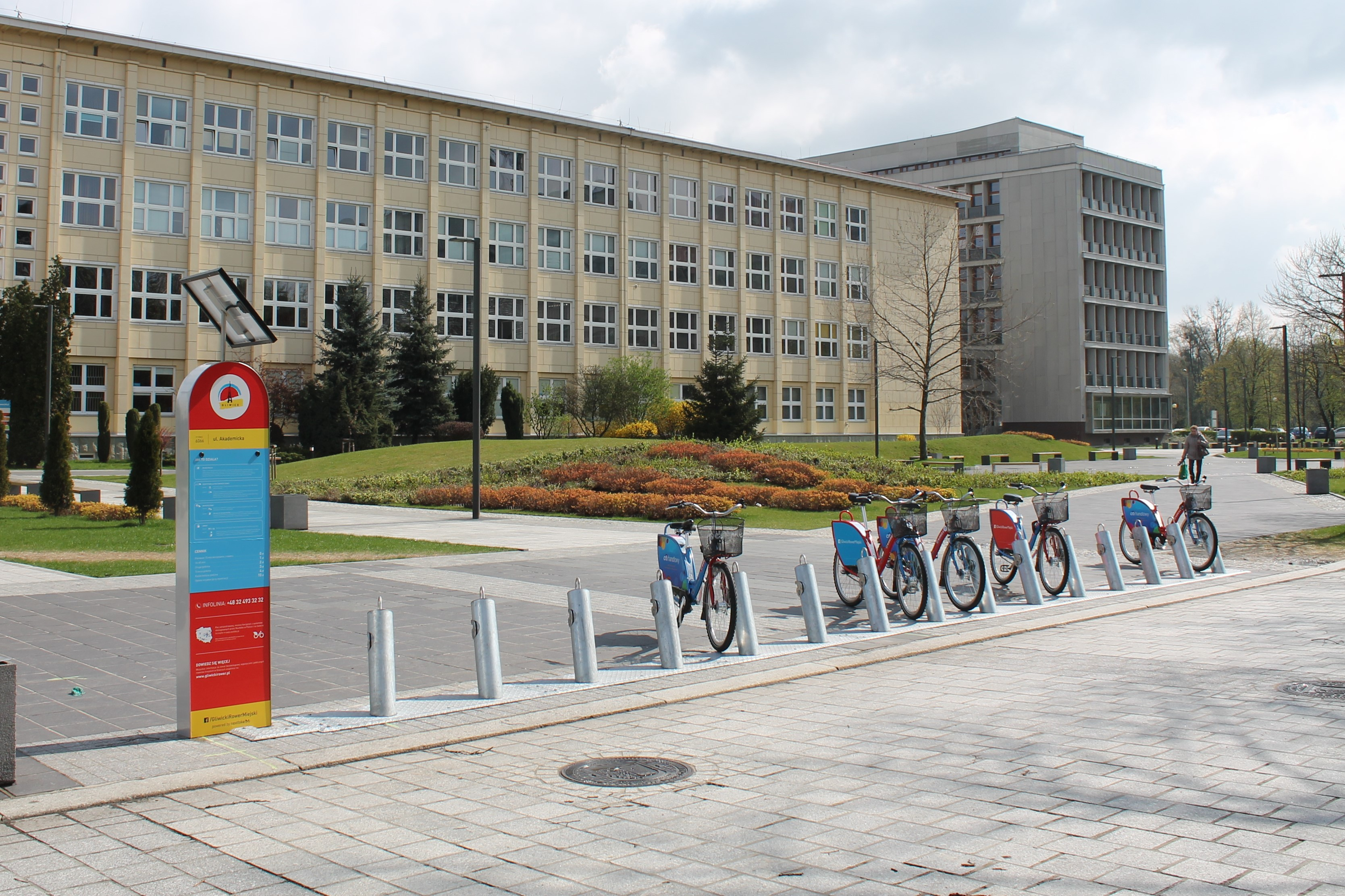
Gliwicki Rower Miejski station from between 2017 and 2019

In June 2016, the Gliwice City Hall announced a tender for the organization, management, and operation of a bicycle-sharing system. The tender specifications stated that the system was to operate seasonally from 1 March to 30 November, consisting of 100 bicycles and 10 self-service stations, each equipped with 15 racks. Additionally, the specifications included an option to expand the system by 5 stations and 50 bicycles. Nextbike and BikeU submitted bids, with the former being selected as the more favorable option. The contract was signed on 6 February 2017.

On 15 March, the list of stations and the color scheme of the stations and bicycles were published, and on 28 March, the system was launched. On 22 September, in celebration of Car Free Day, the free rental period was extended. During the first season, there were over 60,000 rentals, with the most popular route being from Akademicka Street to the train station.

At the end of January 2018, city authorities decided to exercise the option to expand the system with 5 additional stations and 50 bicycles. The new stations were launched on 1 April. On 22 September, once again for Car Free Day, the free rental period was extended. Throughout the season, there were 94,000 rentals, with the most popular route once again being from Akademicka Street to the train station.

Between March and April 2019, the two least-used stations were relocated. On 1 June, Gliwicki Rower Miejski joined a metropolitan agreement that allowed bicycles to be returned in neighboring cities also serviced by nextbike. Throughout the season, there were 85,000 rentals, and for the third consecutive year, the most frequently used route was from Akademicka Street to the train station.

In January 2020, the city announced a tender for operating the system in 2020, requiring a minimum of 20 stations. The only bid was submitted by nextbike, but it was rejected as it exceeded the city's planned budget. At the end of February, a new tender was announced with slightly modified requirements, including fourth-generation bicycles. Nextbike and a consortium of Roovee and Orange Polska submitted bids, but both exceeded the planned budget, leading to the tender's cancellation.

On 27 November 2020, it was announced that a project to reintroduce the public bicycle system won funding through the Gliwice Civic Budget. At the turn of 2020 and 2021, a tender was announced for Gliwicki Rower Miejski operations in 2021, but no contractor was selected. In February, another tender was held, which was won by the Roovee and Orange Polska consortium, offering a system of 30 stations and 300 bicycles. A contract was signed with the consortium on 30 April, and the system was launched on 30 May. In the summer, an additional (31st) sponsored station was introduced. Throughout the season, more than 6,000 users made over 90,000 rentals, covering more than 292,000 km.

In March 2022, the city signed another contract with the Roovee and Orange Polska consortium for the organization, management, and operation of a system consisting of 35 stations and 350 bicycles (ultimately expanding to 36 stations and 365 bicycles) for the 2022 season. The system operated from April to November and recorded 176,000 rentals.

On 11 January 2023, the city announced that due to excessively high prices in the tender for 2023 and the planned launch of the Metrorower system, the city was discontinuing the system.

== Stations ==
The 2022 Gliwicki Rower Miejski system consisted of 36 docking stations:

- Akademicka Street – Arena Gliwice
- Akademicka Street – Politechnika
- Brylantowa Street
- Cechowa Street – Skwer Nacka
- Dąbrowski Street / Poniatowski Street
- Gwiazdy Polarnej Street
- Inwalidów Wojennych Square
- Jan Paweł II Street
- Jesienna Street
- Kormoranów Street
- Kościuszki Street – Biblioteka
- Kozielska Street – Szkoła
- Kozielska Street / Góry Chełmskiej Street
- Kozłowska Street
- Lubliniecka Street – Radiostacja
- Nowy Świat Street – Teatr Miejski
- Obrońców Pokoju Street
- Okulicki Street / Kozielska Street
- Parkowa Street
- Piastowska Street
- Piłsudski Street
- Pocztowa Street
- Poniatowski Street
- Przyjaźni Avenue / Zwycięstwa Street
- Siemiński Street
- Sikornik Street
- Sikorski Street
- Słowacki Street
- Warszawska Street – Neptun
- Wolności Street
- Zakole Street
- Zimnej Wody Street
- Zwycięstwa Street / Fredro Street
- Zygmuntowska Street
- Żwirki i Wigury Street
- Amazon KTW3

== Bicycles ==
In 2022, the system consisted of 365 bicycles:

- 358 standard bicycles
- 5 cargo bikes
- 2 tandem bicycles
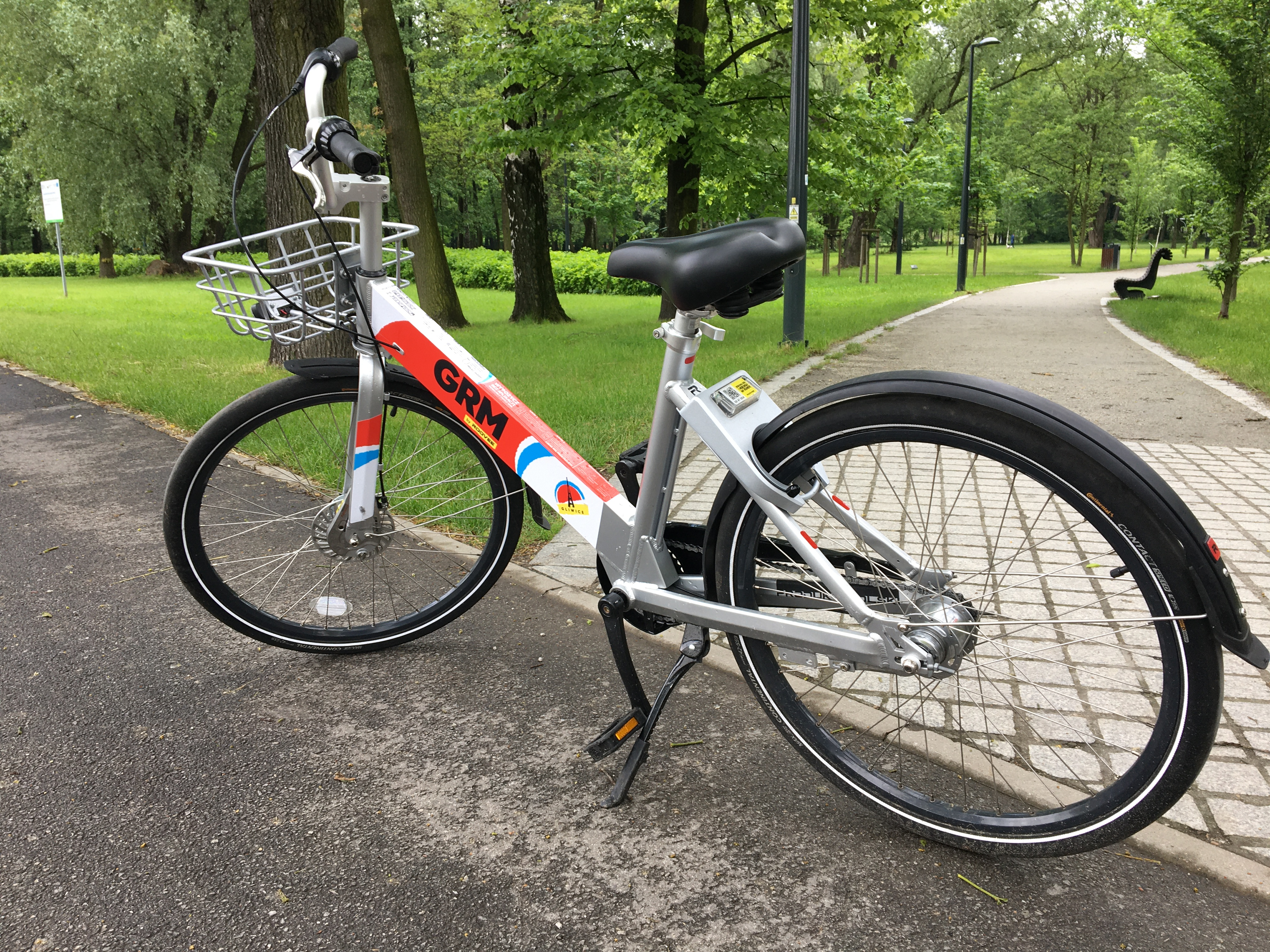
Standard bicycle

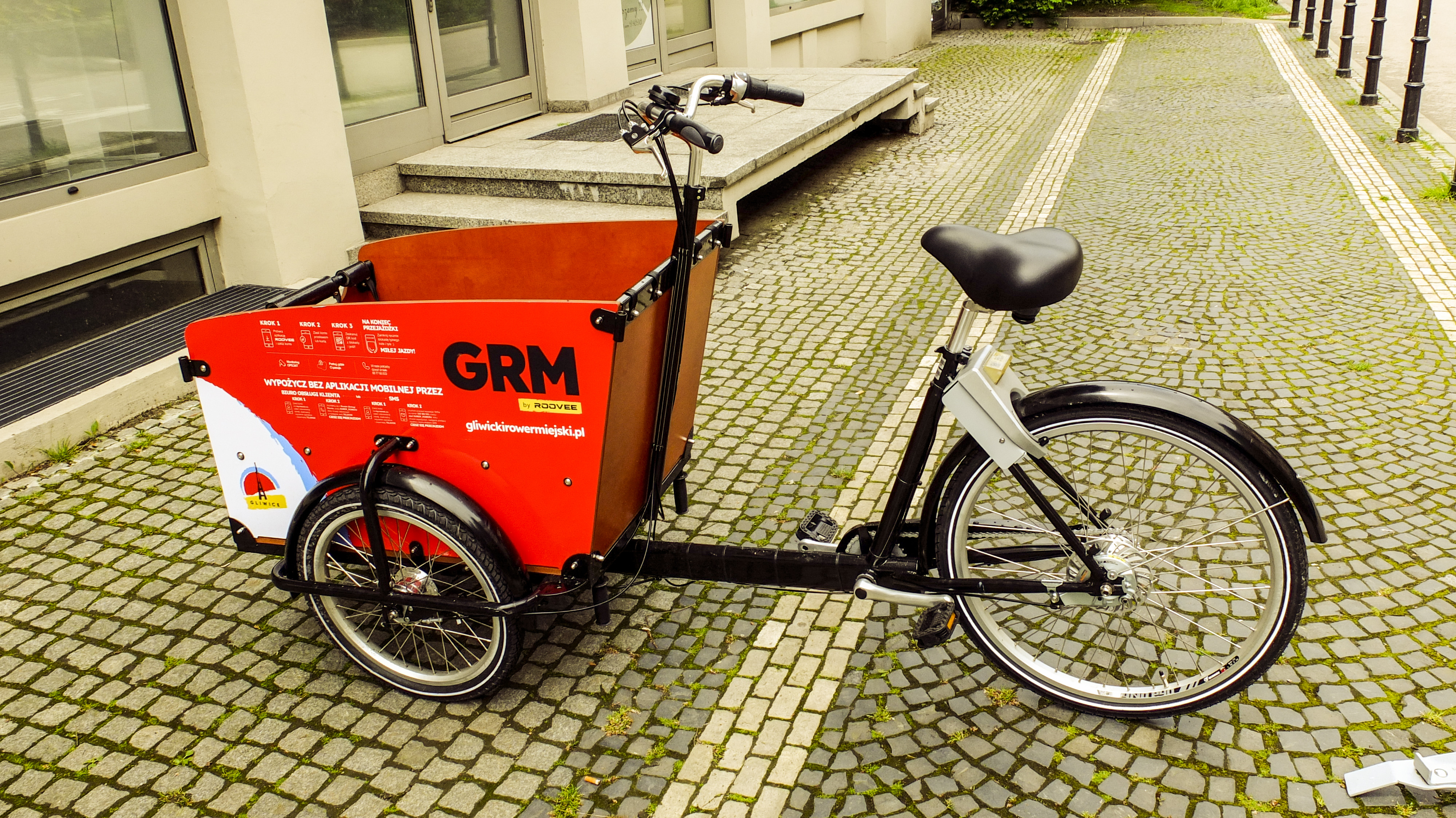
Cargo bike

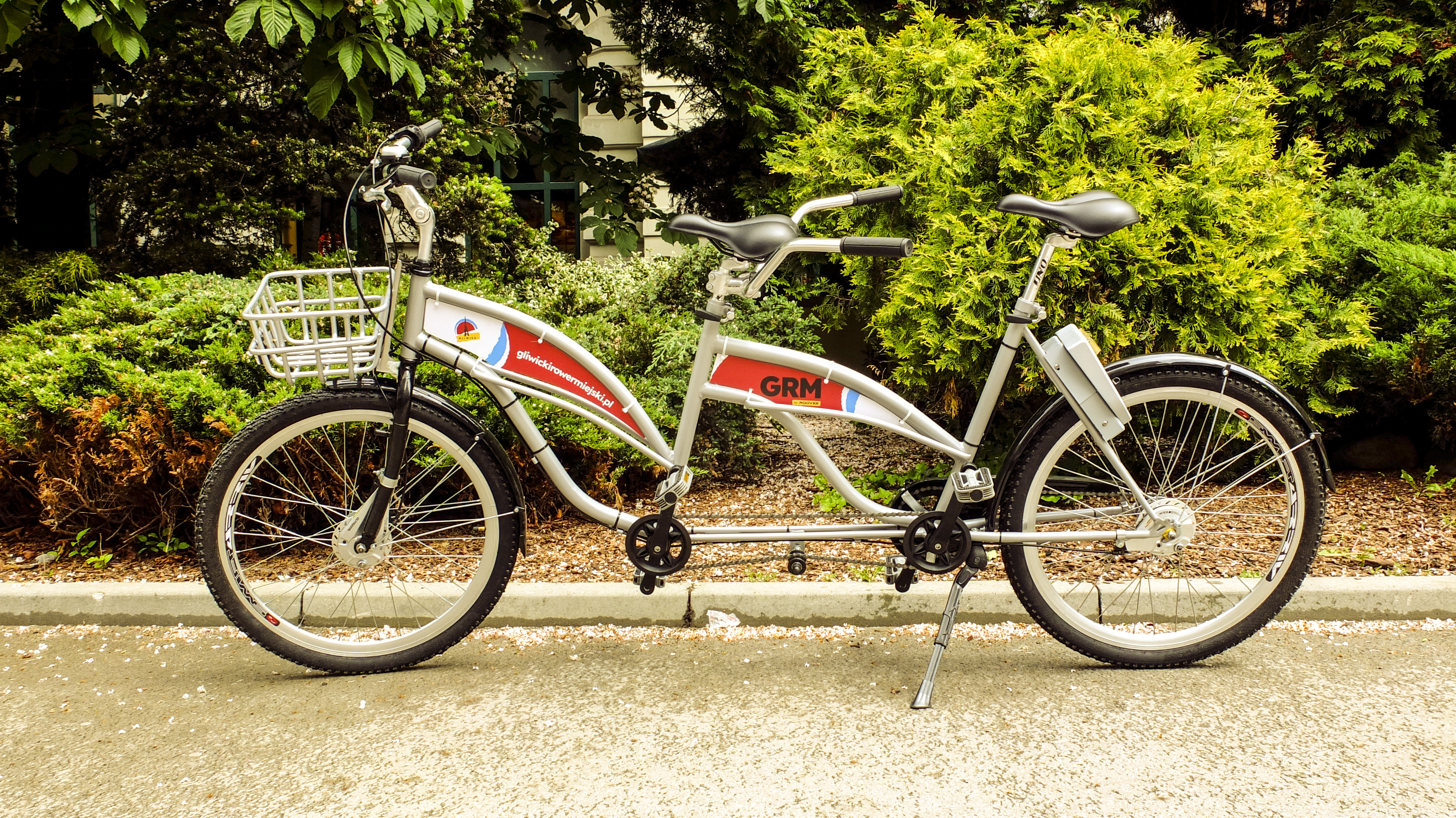
Tandem bicycle

== Operation of the system ==
To become a user of the system, one had to register and pay an activation fee. The first 15 minutes of bicycle rental were free, and each additional minute cost 0.05 PLN. Bicycles could be rented through a dedicated mobile app.

== Awards and recognitions ==
- Złoty Gwóźdź 2017 – award given by Nowiny Gliwickie for the best investment in Gliwice in 2017.
