= Donkey Republic =

Danish bicycle-sharing company

- Traded as: DonkeyRepublic Holding A/S
- Industry: Urban transport
- Founded: 2014; 12 years ago
- Founder: Erdem Ovacik
- Headquarters: Skelbækgade 4, Copenhagen, Denmark
- Area served: Europe
- Key people: Niels Henrik Rasmussen (Director), Christian Dufft (Director)
- Products: Bicycle-sharing systems
- Services: Mobile app, website
- Website: www.donkey.bike

Donkey Republic is a Danish company that operates public bike-sharing systems. The company was founded in Copenhagen, Denmark, in 2014. The company is listed on Nasdaq Nordic since 2021. Donkey Republic primarily serves urban areas, integrating with city public transportation systems to improve mobility and decrease traffic congestion.

Countries served by Donkey Republic as of April 2026

== Corporate affairs ==
The key trends for Donkey Republic are (as at the financial year ending December 31):

	Revenue (€m)	Operating profit (EBIT) (€m)	Number of employees (average)	Number of users (Note: with a minimum of one rental) (k)	Number of trips (m)	Number of active bikes (k)	Notes/ sources
2018	2.7			152	1.8	5.7	
2019	4.5			252	3.3	10.5	
2020	2.9	−3.2	60	138	2.3	12.9	
2021	5.0	−2.4	58	217	3.3	13	
2022	9.1	−5.4	113	360	4.5	13.3	
2023	15.4	−1.6	137	561	6.7	19.9	
2024	19.6	0.13	163	680	8.4	21.1	
2025	22.2	−0.29		749	9.4	22.7	

== Usage ==
In the app the pickup-up stations are displayed. The lock of the bike can be unlocked and locked by a Bluetooth connection with the smartphone. It is possible to pause the ride. The rental can be ended by bringing the bike to a drop-off location and confirming it on the smartphone. The service can be used without leaving deposits or showing ID.

Donkey Republic offers pay-per-use and local memberships for a fixed monthly price.

== History ==
In 2017, the bike sharing service provider Obike, Ofo and Donkey Republic started in Vienna. Ofo and Obike left in 2018. Donkey Republic left Vienna in March 2020 due to lack of profitability, removing its 500 bikes.

In May 2018, Donkey Republic started in Paris stating "it can resist the risks of theft and damage to bicycles" after the bike sharing company Gobee withdrew from the French market because of vandalism.

In June 2019, the company provided e-bikes for the first time in Berlin. In October of the same year the e-bike fleet was increased from 100 by another 200 ones.

In July 2021, Donkey Republic announced a partnership with Google Maps.

In 2022, the company started with 1,650 electric bicycles in 32 Antwerp and East Flanders municipalities.

In June 2023, the company launched Finland's first shared-use e-cargo bikes in Turku. The cargo bikes operate independently from the fölläri city bike system. The service is part of the Scale Up project that is funded by the European Commission.

In May 2024, Donkey Republic terminated its service in Budapest without prior notice.

== Gallery ==
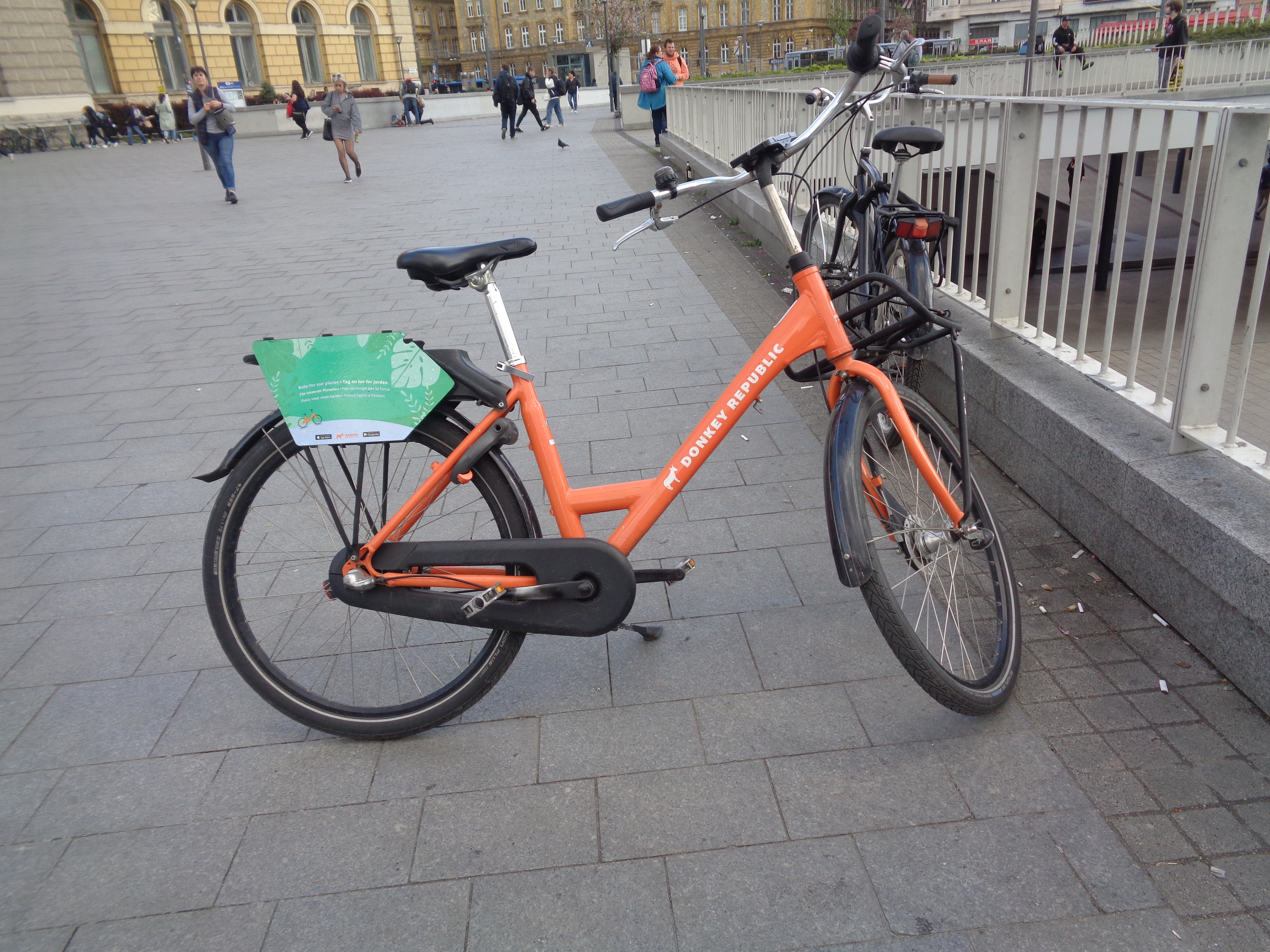
Bicycle in Budapest

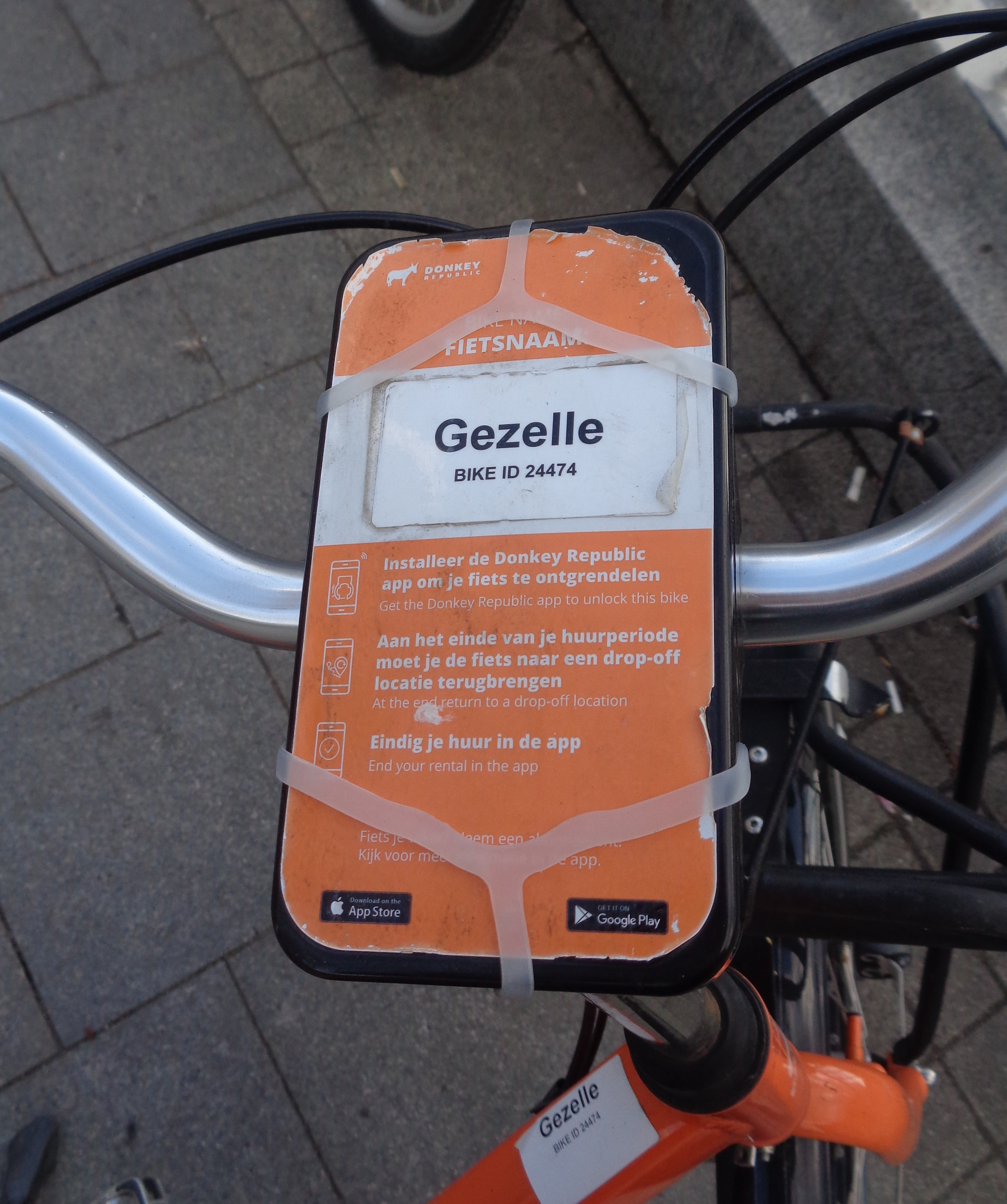
Smartphone holder

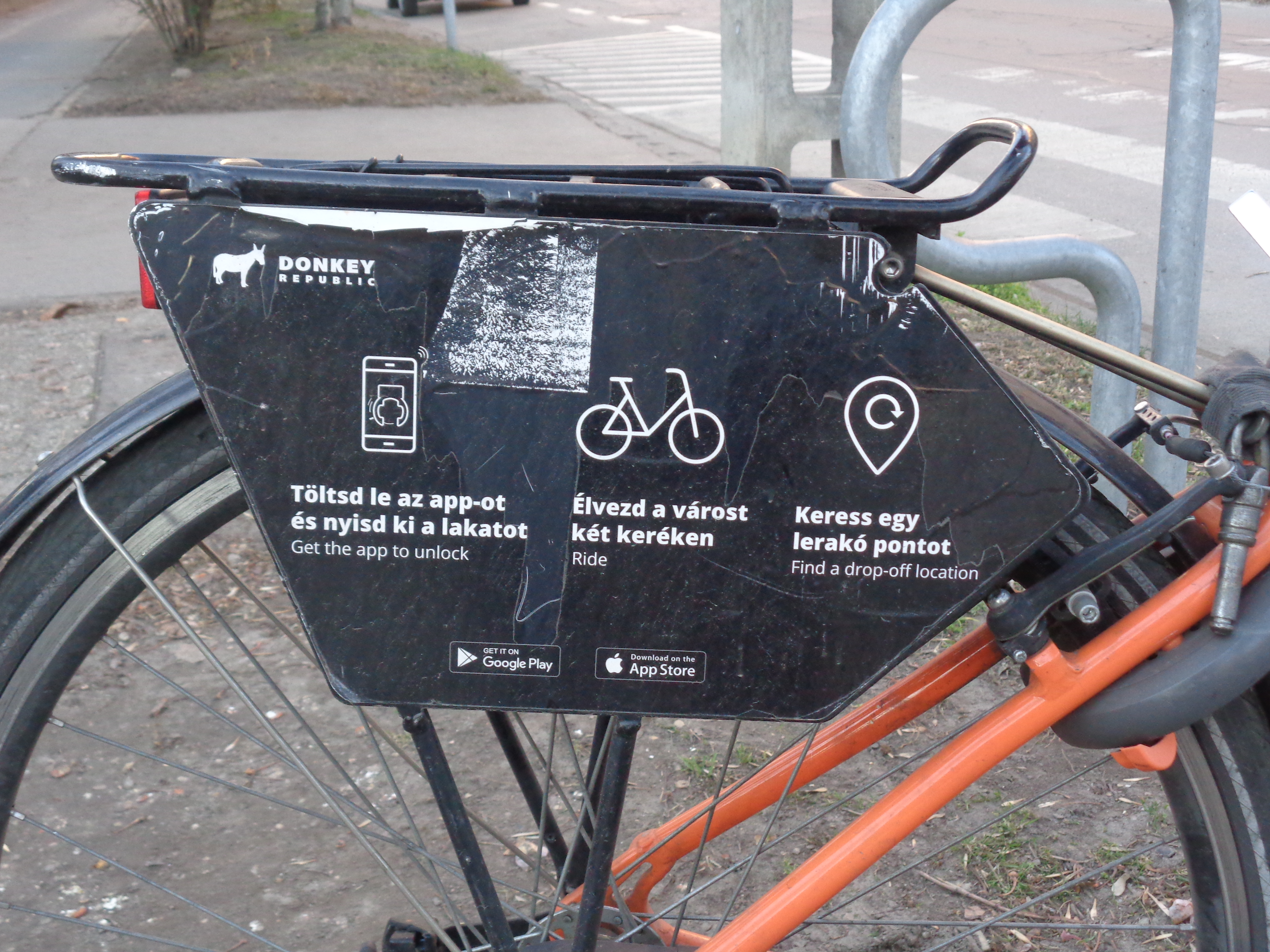
Bicycle rack

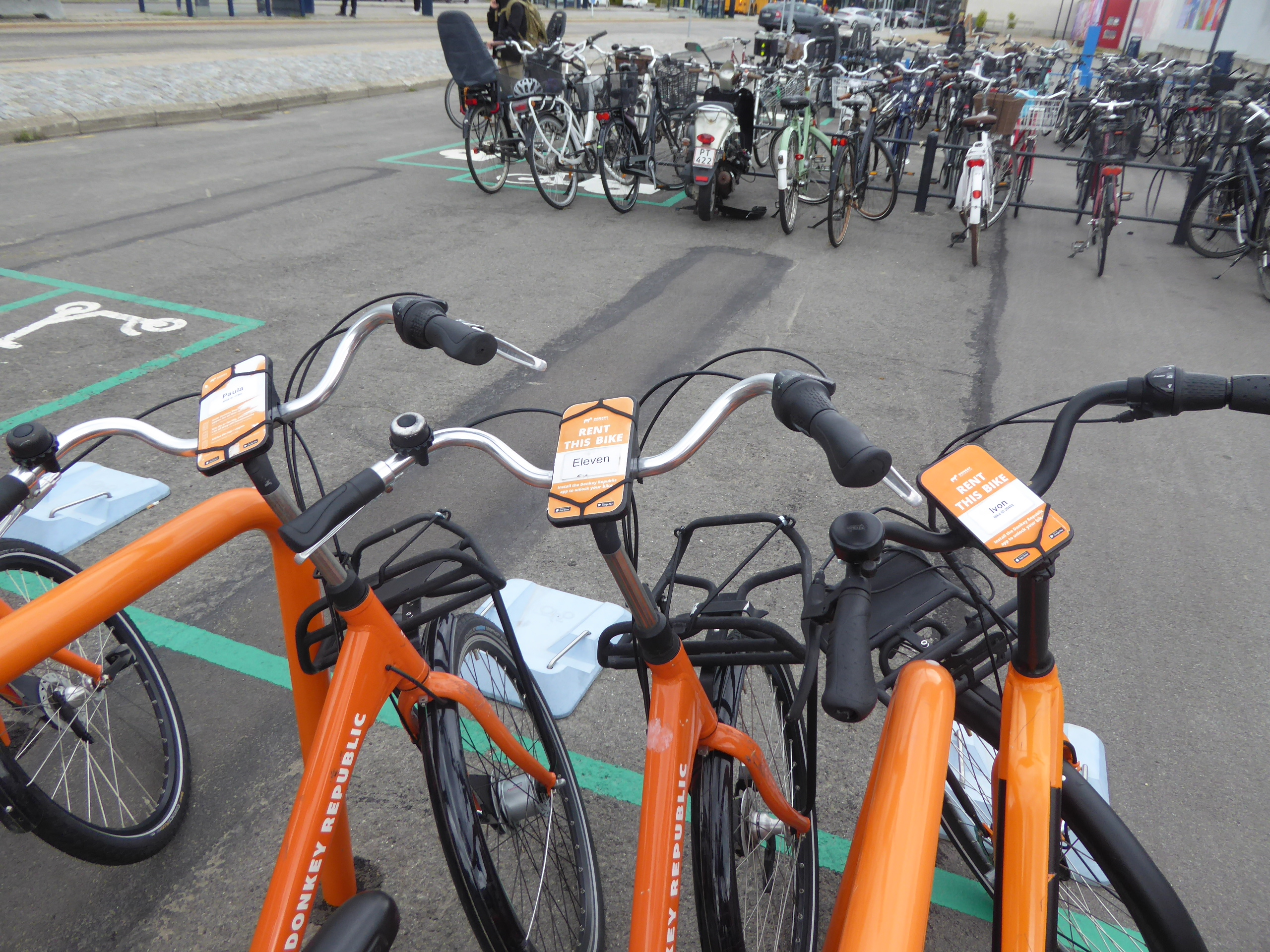
Bicycle handlebar

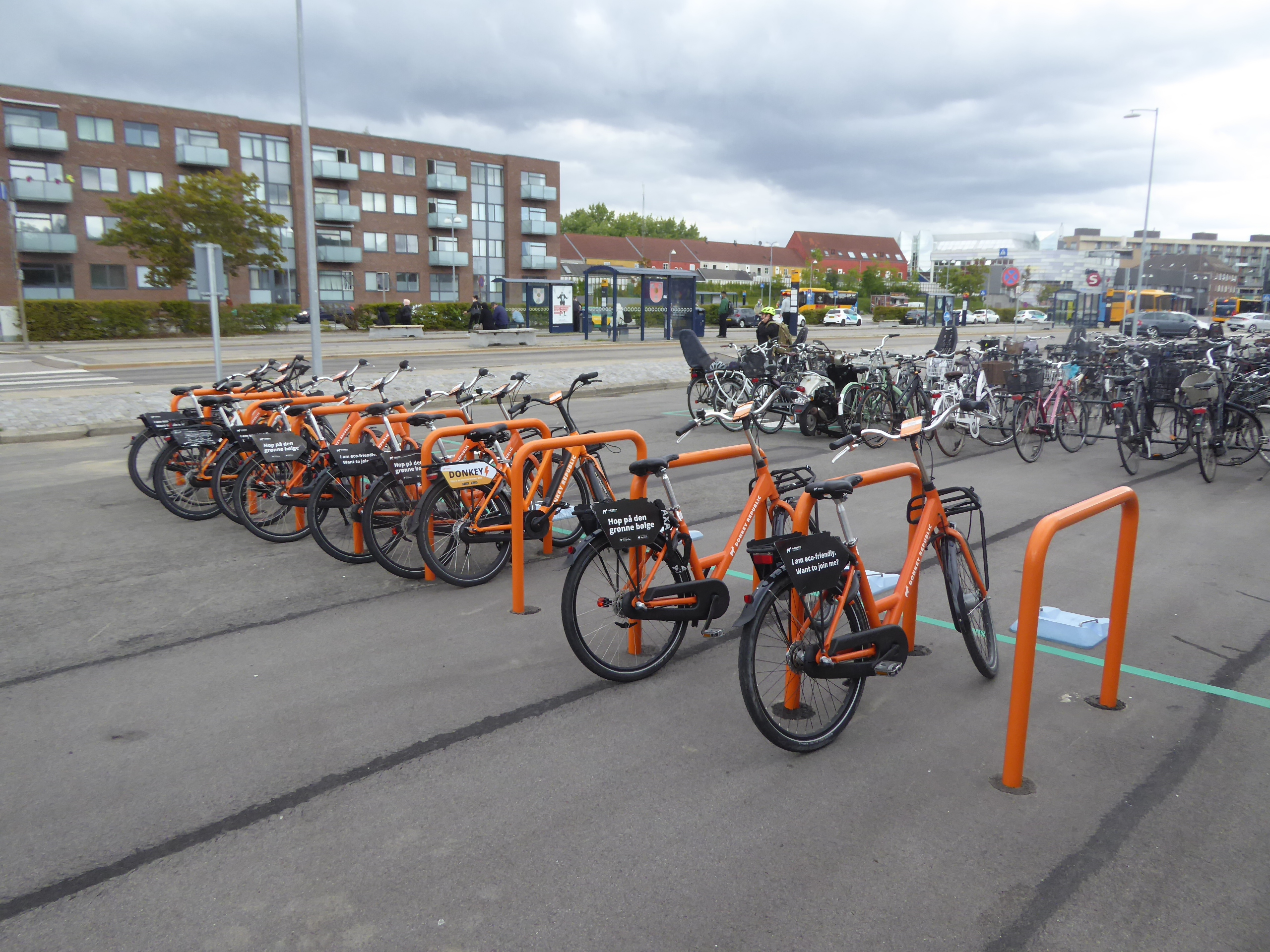
Bicycles in Copenhagen

== See also ==
- List of bicycle-sharing systems
- Nextbike
