= Nextbike =

German bicycle-sharing company

Nextbike GmbH
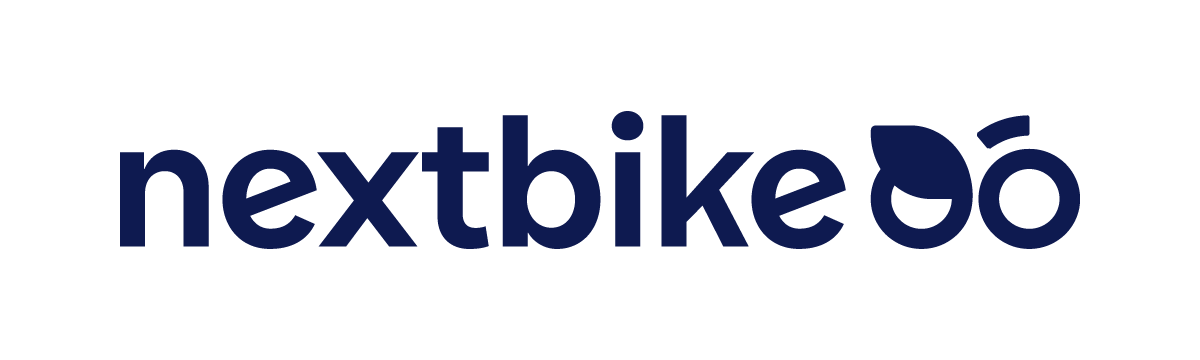
- Type: GmbH
- Traded as: nextbike
- Industry: Urban transport
- Founded: 2004; 22 years ago
- Founder: Ralf Kalupner
- Headquarters: Karl-Heine-Straße 46, Leipzig, Germany
- Area served: Europe
- Key people: Sebastian Popp (CEO), Meik Bruhs (managing director)
- Products: Bicycle sharing systems
- Services: Mobile app, website
- Website: www.nextbike.net

Nextbike GmbH (stylised as nextbike) is a German company that develops and operates public bicycle-sharing systems. Founded in Leipzig in 2004, it is headquartered in the city and provides bicycle-sharing systems for public transport authorities, municipalities and other public institutions. As of 2026, the company operated more than 115,000 bicycles across around 400 cities in 23 countries. Its key markets include Germany, Poland and Spain, with operations also in Austria, the Czech Republic, Croatia and the United Kingdom.

Nextbike was acquired by TIER Mobility in 2021. In 2024, private equity firm STAR Capital acquired a majority stake.

== Usage ==
Bicycle users are normally obtained through a subscription system, where each bike is locked to either itself or to a rental station. By scanning the QR code on the bike with the nextbike app bikes can be rented. The bikes can be returned via app, hotline, terminal. There are cities with a flex zone allowing users to return the bike anywhere within a defined area for a small additional fee.

== Projects ==
Countries served by Nextbike as of March 2026

=== Germany ===
Nextbike operates a number of municipal and regional bicycle-sharing systems in Germany, including systems in Berlin, Cologne, the Munich region and the Rhine-Neckar Metropolitan Region.

MyRadl is the regional bicycle-sharing system for Munich and 36 other municipalities in the Munich Transport and Tariff Association (MVV). Operated by nextbike, the system was launched in May 2026 and is planned to comprise around 6,700 bicycles, including conventional bicycles and pedelecs, at approximately 1,000 stations.

KVB-Rad was launched in Cologne in 2015 and is operated by Kölner Verkehrs-Betriebe (KVB) in cooperation with nextbike. Since 2021, the system has had a fleet of 3,000 bicycles. As of 2025, it had 150 stations; bicycles can also be returned flexibly within a designated zone in central Cologne.

VRNnextbike was launched in March 2015 by nextbike and the Verkehrsverbund Rhein-Neckar (VRN), initially serving Mannheim, Heidelberg, Ludwigshafen and Speyer. The regional system allows bicycles to be rented and returned across participating municipalities and is integrated with public transport in the VRN area. Nextbike's current operating contract runs until February 2027, after which the VRN plans to introduce a successor system called VRNrad.

Metropolradruhr was launched in 2010 by nextbike and the Regionalverband Ruhr as a regional bicycle-sharing system linking cities in the Ruhr area. Nextbike operated the system until 31 March 2026, when Donkey Republic took over its operation.

=== International projects ===
Nextbike has an extensive network in Poland, where it operates bicycle-sharing systems in more than 80 cities. In Warsaw, it operates Veturilo as one of the largest bicycle-sharing systems in Poland with 3,460 bicycles.

Nextbike has also expanded in Spain, where it operates several bicycle-sharing systems, including AMBici in the Barcelona metropolitan area, BiciPalma in Palma de Mallorca and BizkaiBizi in Biscay. AMBici is its largest system in Spain with more than 2,600 electric bicycles.

In Austria, nextbike operates WienMobil Rad on behalf of Wiener Linien, with stations across whole Vienna.

Nextbike operated several bicycle-sharing systems in the United Kingdom, including services in Bath, Glasgow, Cardiff and Belfast. The Bath service ended in 2019, while the Cardiff system closed at the end of 2023 following extensive theft and vandalism. Its Glasgow service ended in October 2025, when Voi Technology became the city's bicycle-sharing operator.

== Gallery ==
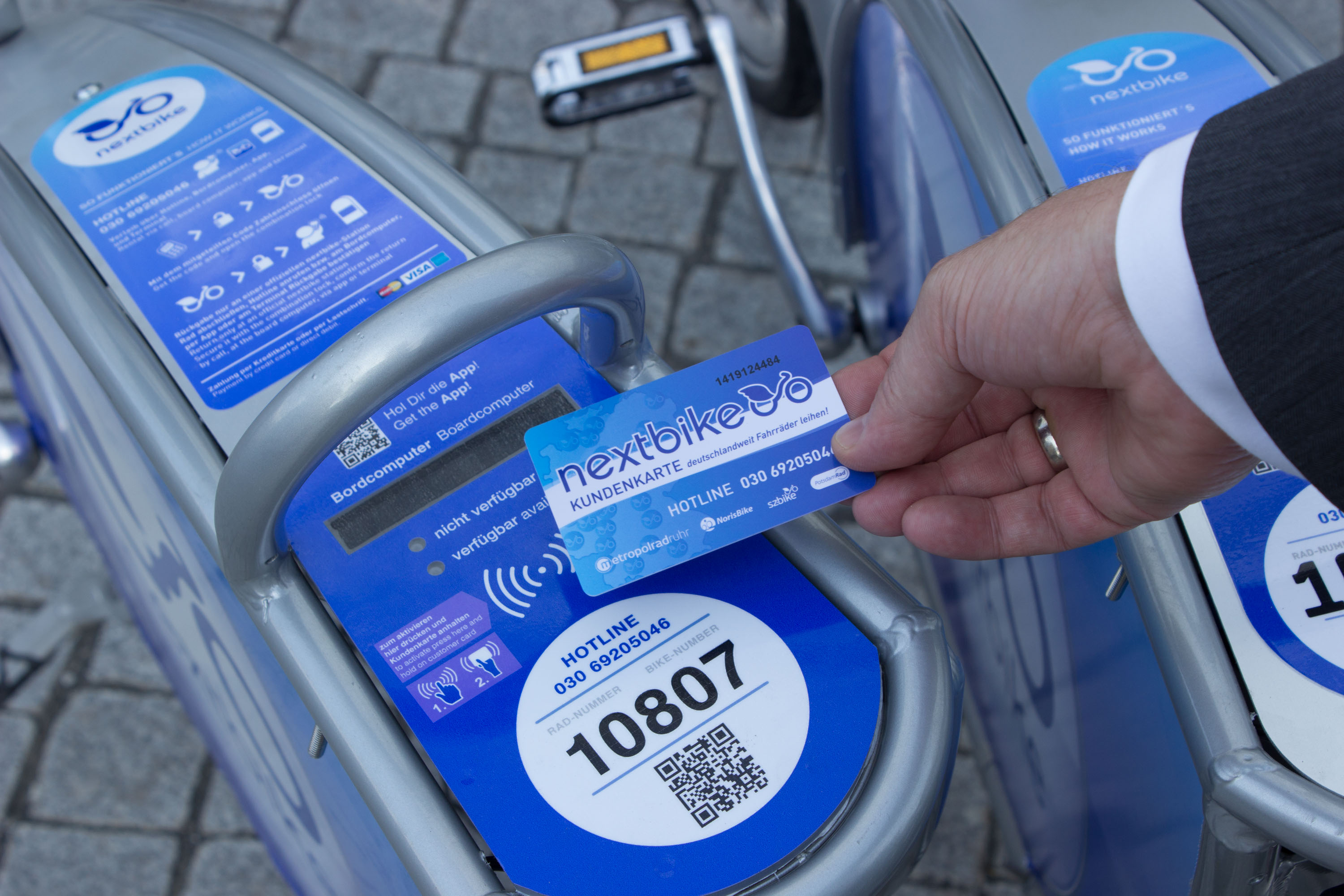
nextbike on-board computer

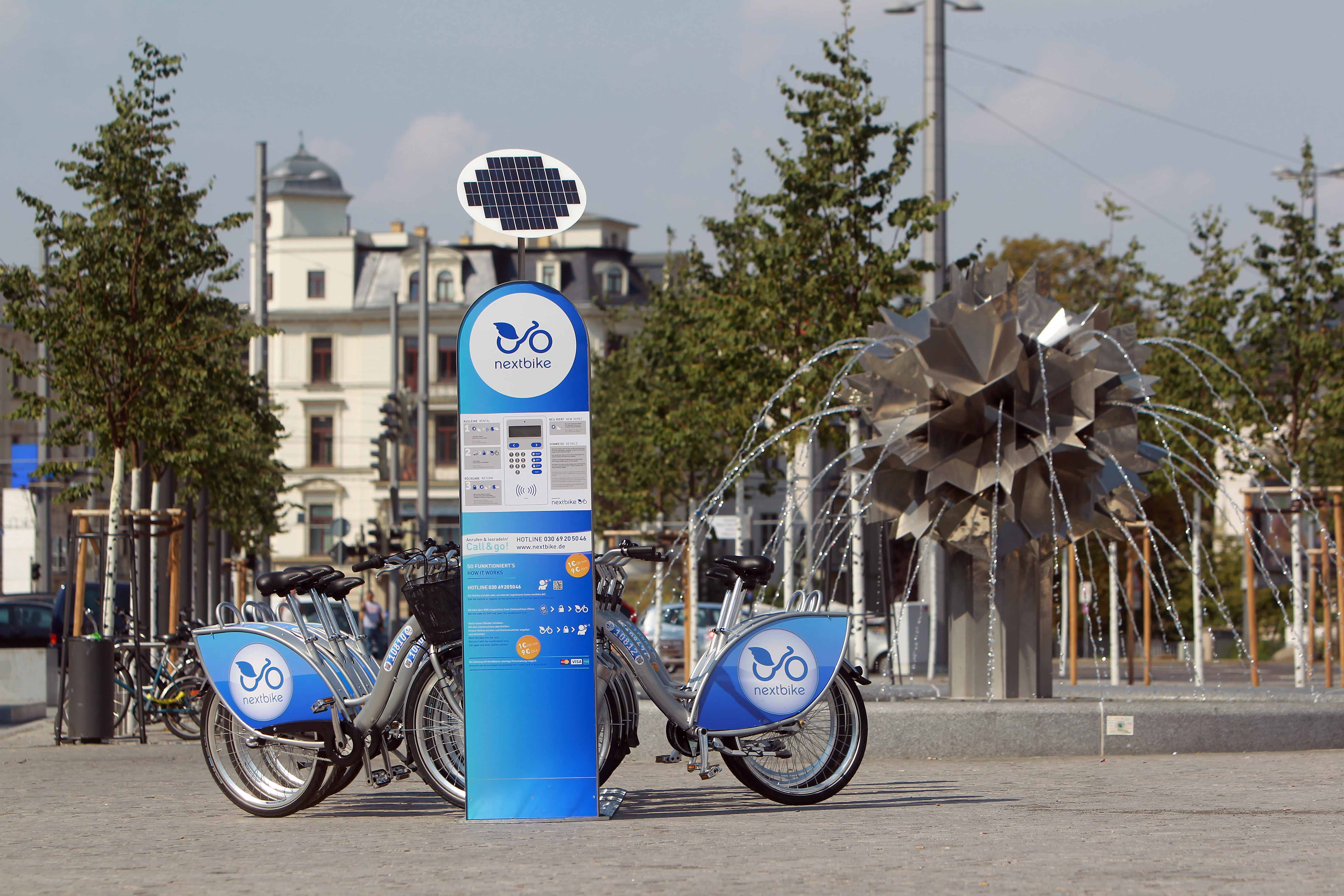
nextbike station terminal

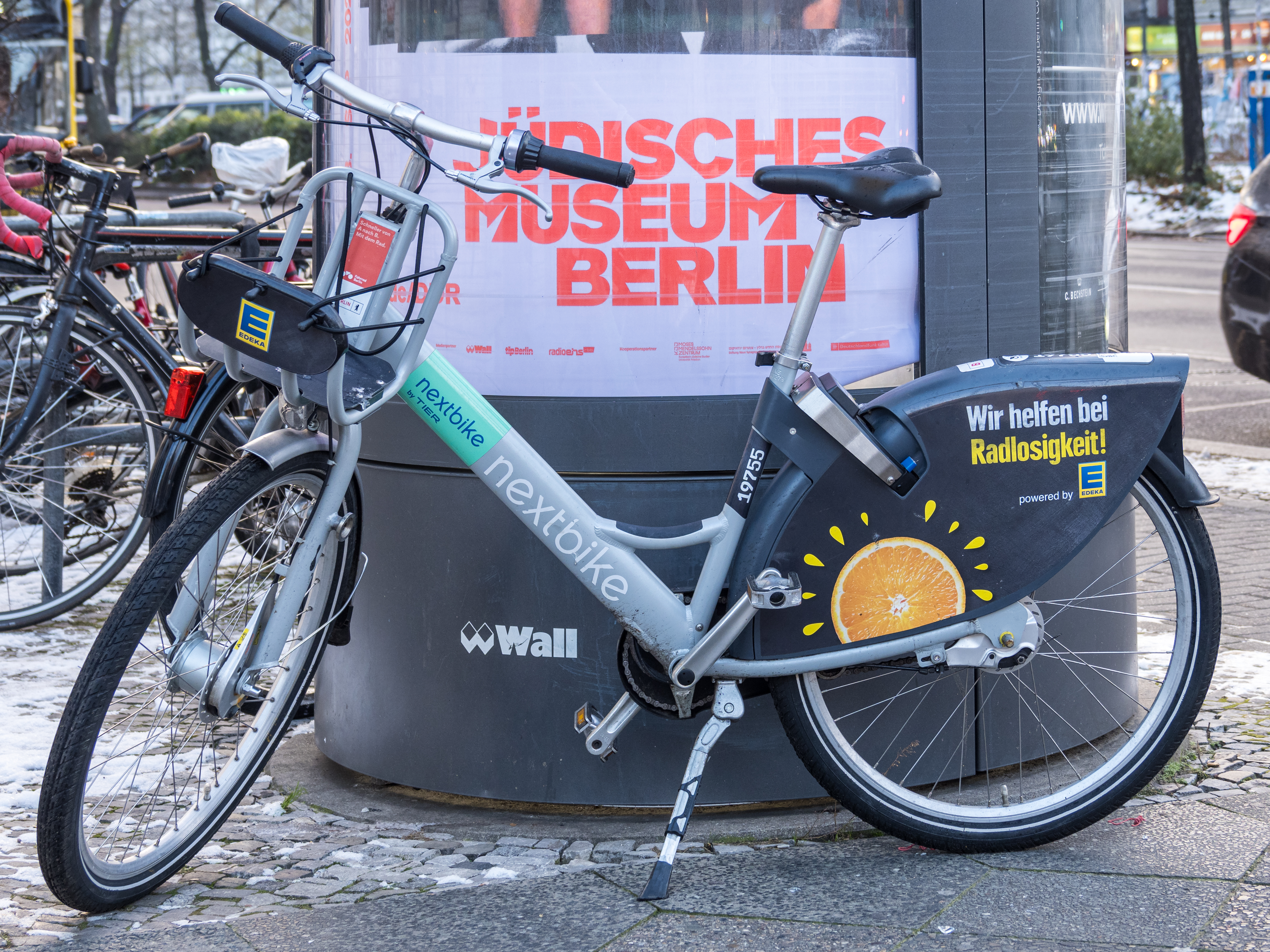
Nextbike in Berlin

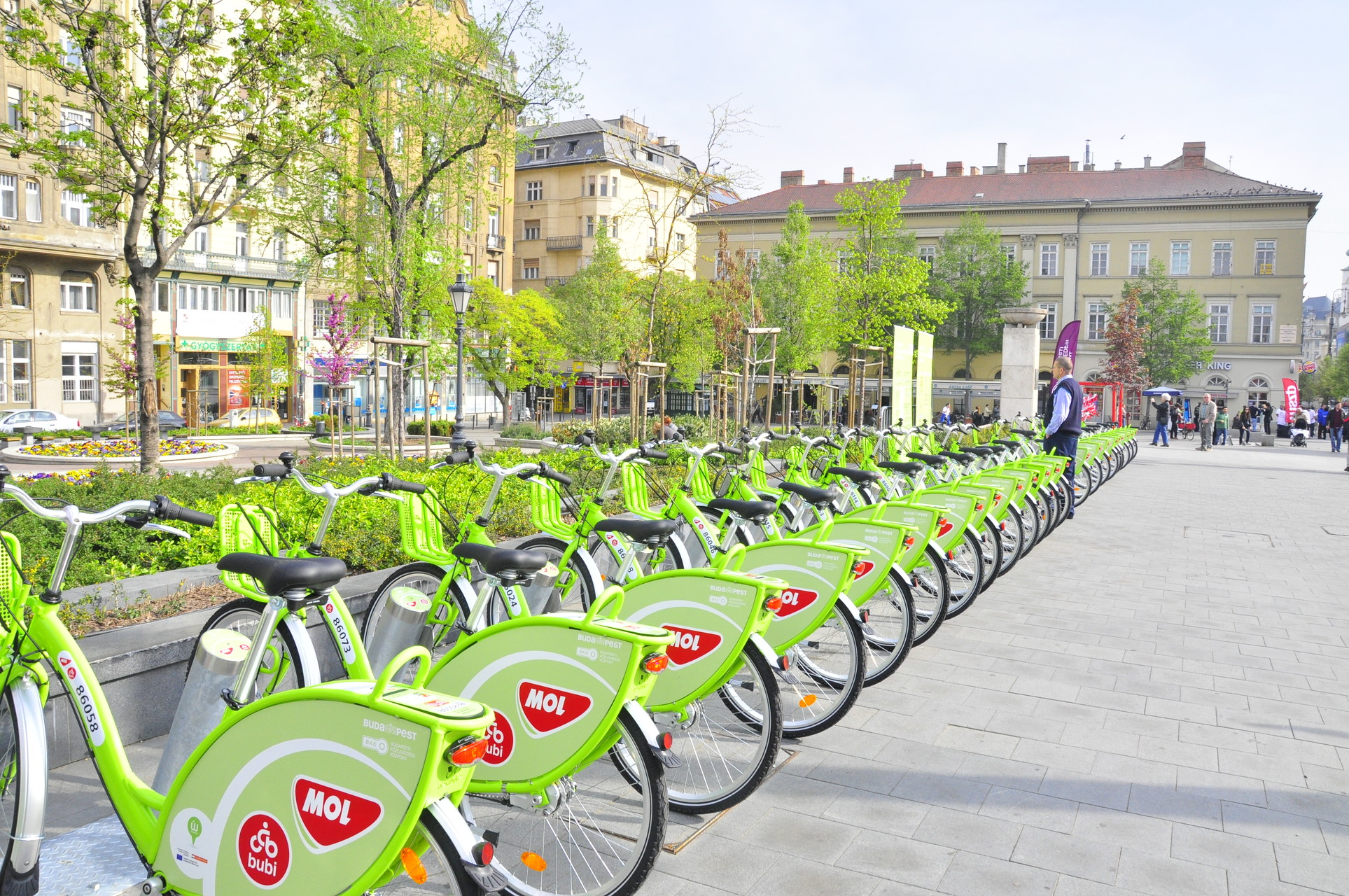
MOL Bubi station in Budapest

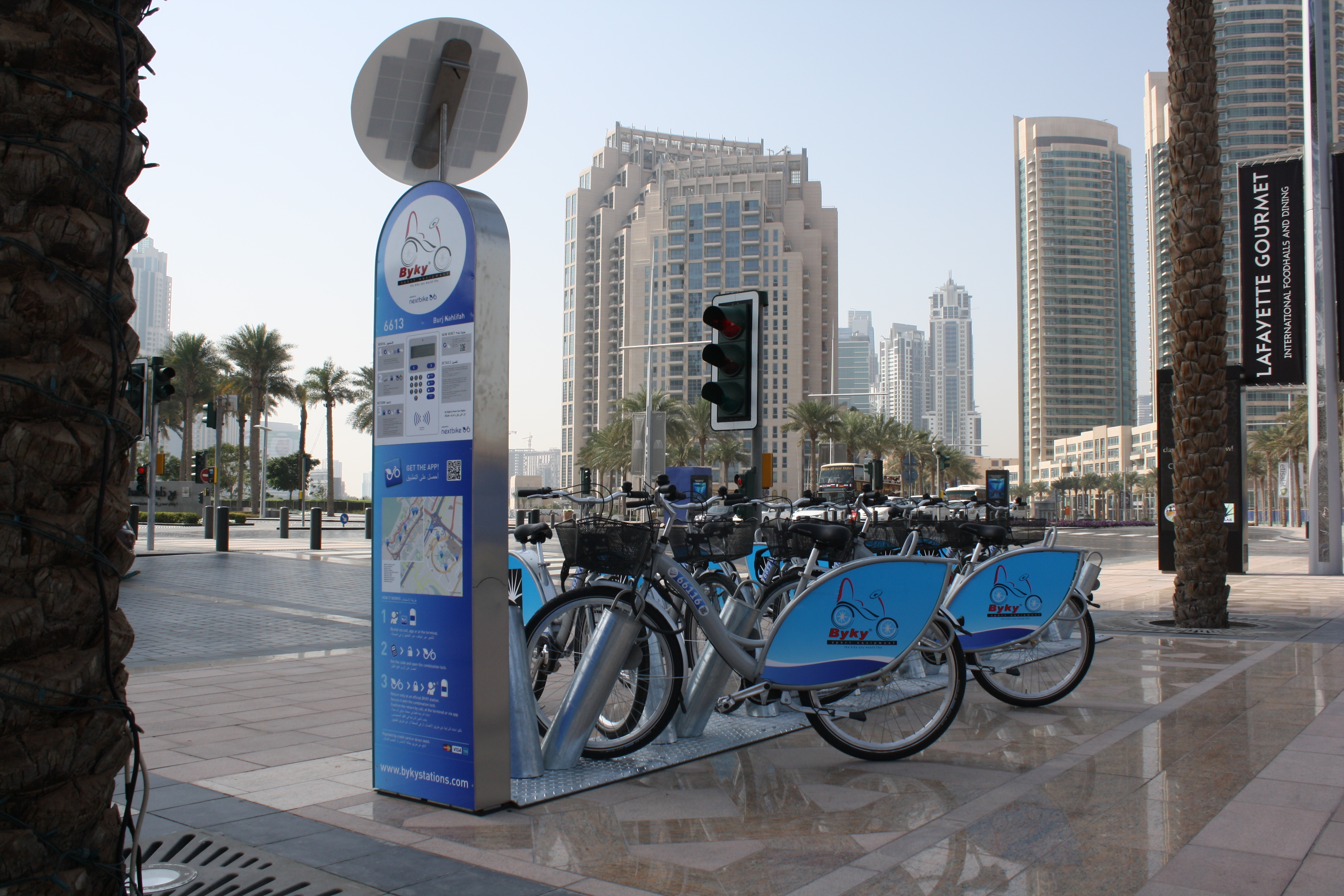
Bykystations station in Dubai

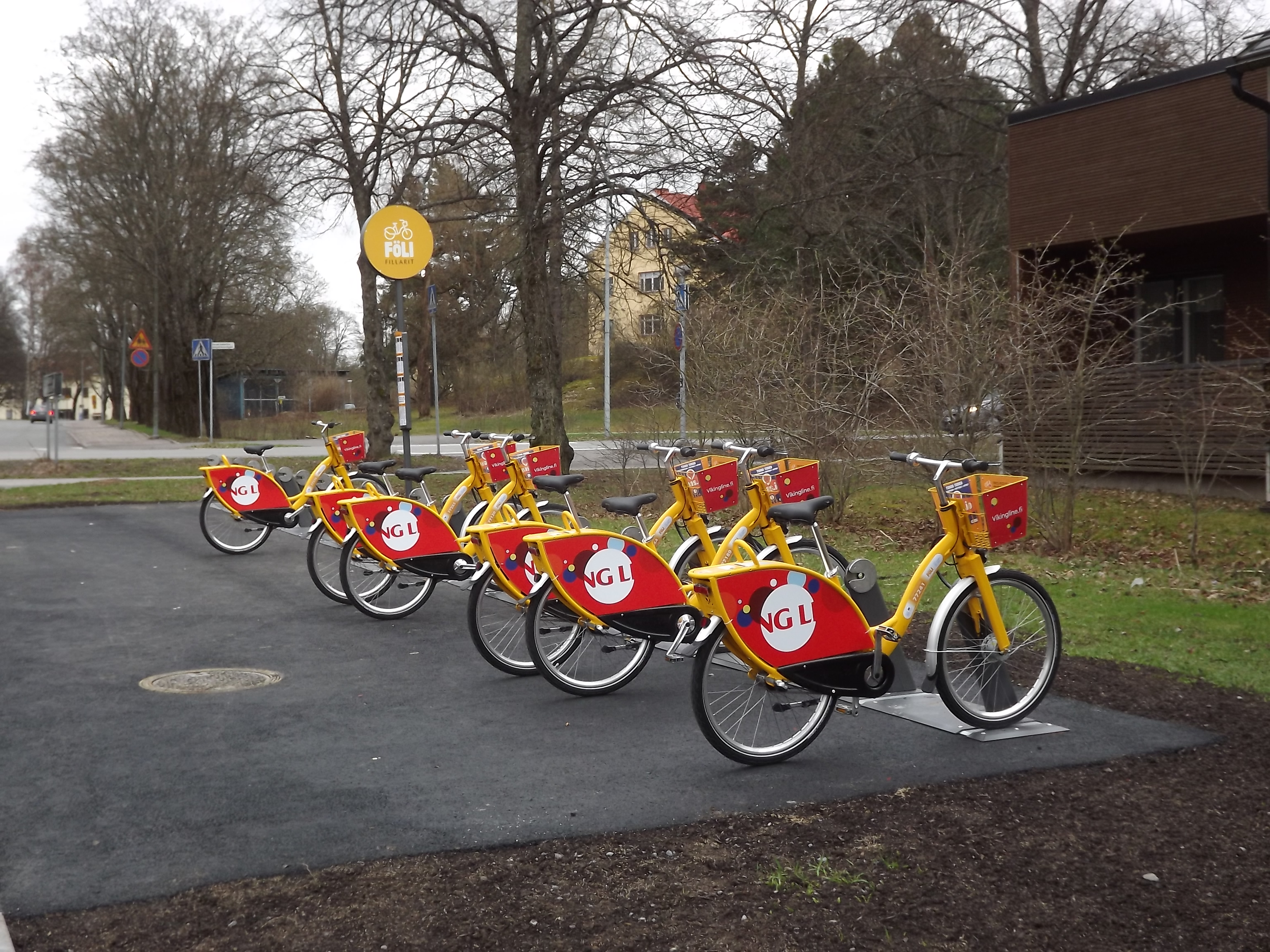
Turku, Finland

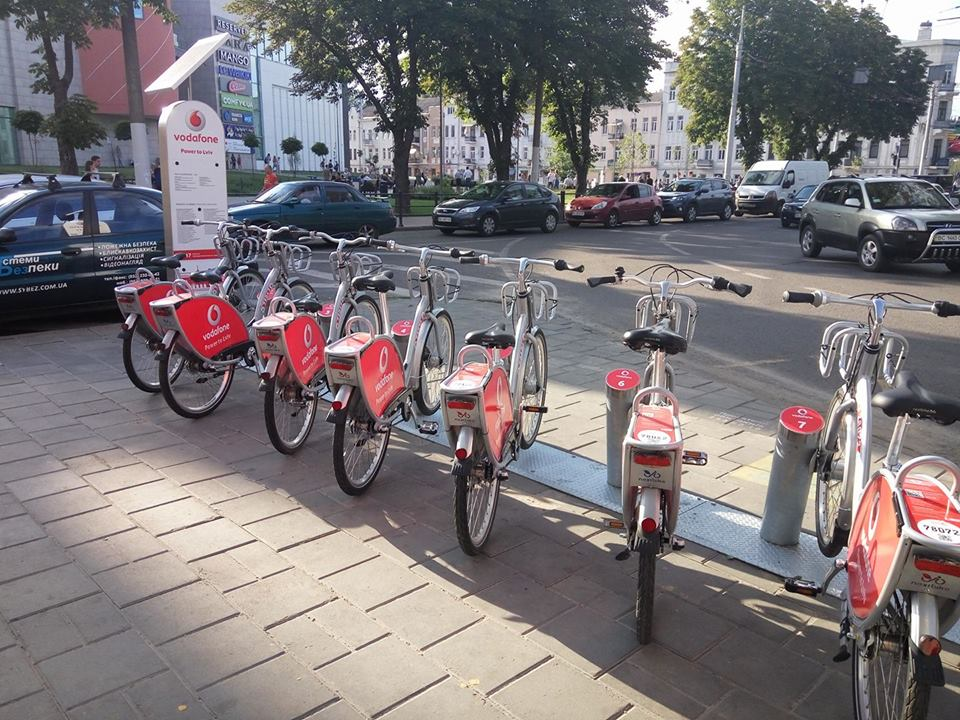
Lviv, Ukraine

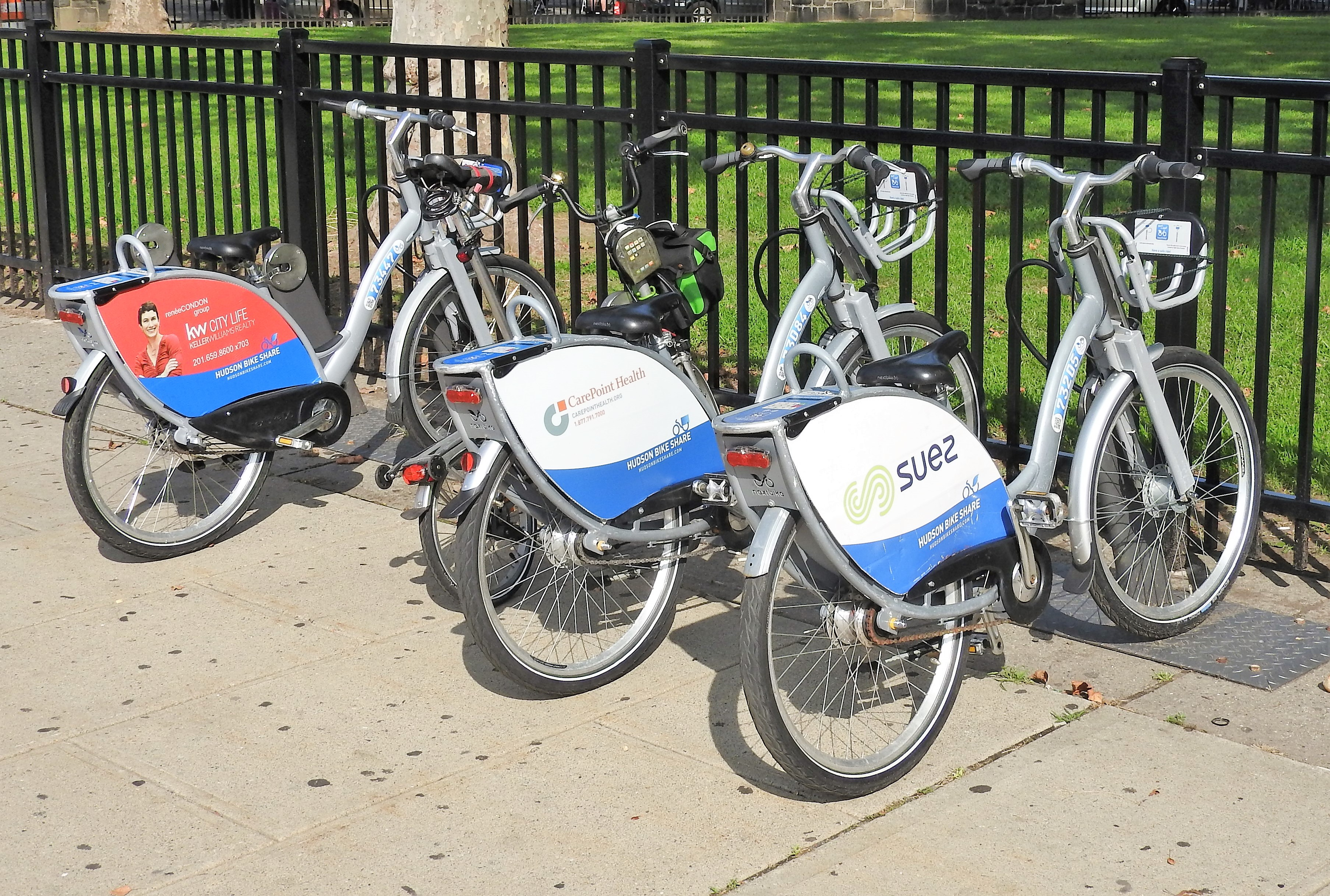
Hudson county, New Jersey, USA

== See also ==
- Donkey Republic
- List of bicycle sharing systems
