= Bicycle poverty reduction =

Use of bicycles as a means to address poverty

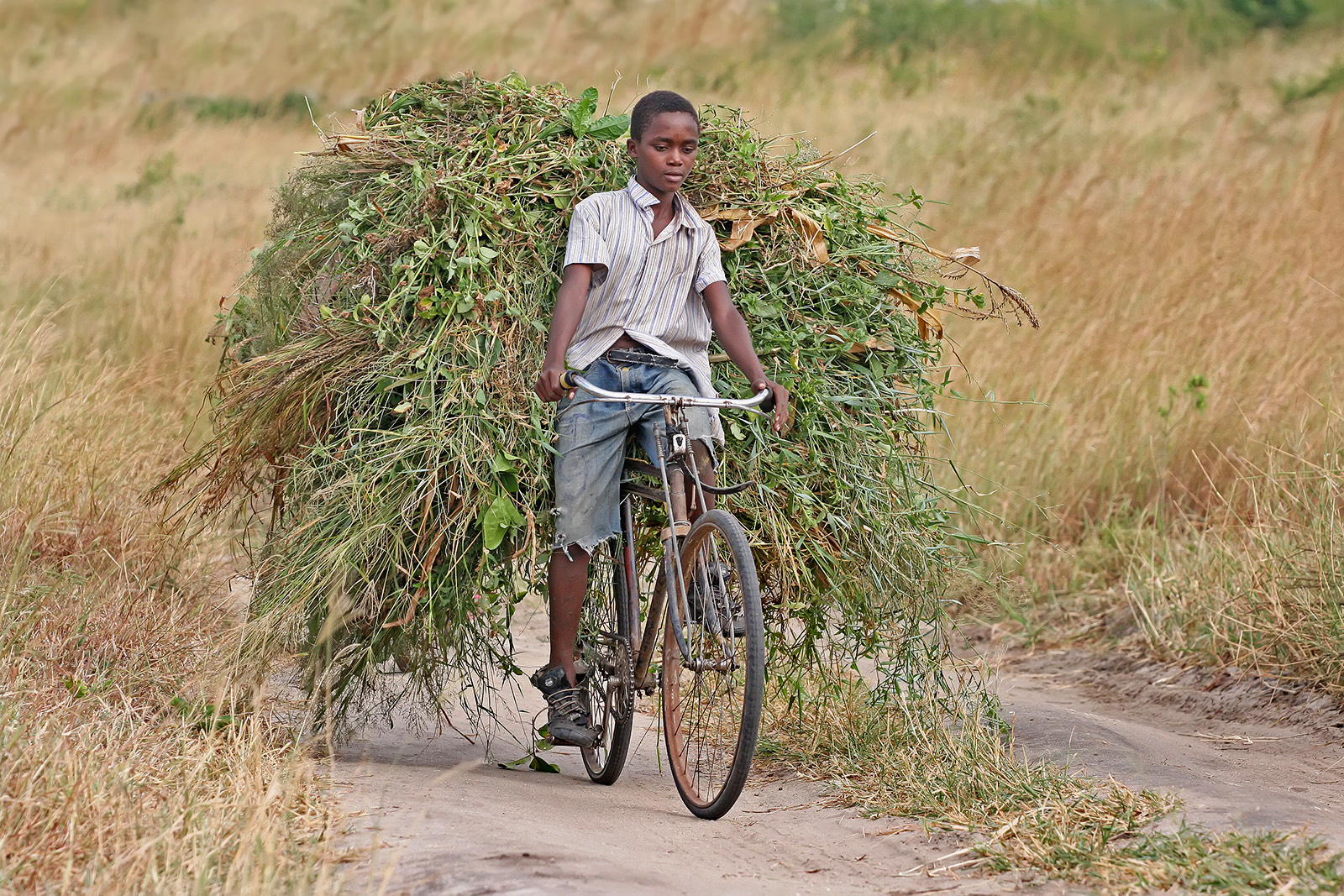
Tanzanian boy transporting fodder on his bicycle to feed his family cattle

Bicycle poverty reduction is the concept that access to bicycles and the transportation infrastructure to support them can dramatically reduce poverty. This has been demonstrated in various pilot projects in South Asia and Africa. Experiments done in Africa (Uganda and Tanzania) and Sri Lanka on hundreds of households have shown that a bicycle can increase the income of a poor family by as much as 35%.

Transport, if analyzed for the cost–benefit analysis for rural poverty alleviation, has given one of the best returns in this regard. For example, road investments in India were a staggering 3–10 times more effective than almost all other investments and subsidies in rural economy in the decade of the 1990s. A road can ease transport on a macro level, while bicycle access supports it at the micro level. In that sense, the bicycle can be one of the most effective means to eradicate poverty in poor nations.

== Gallery ==
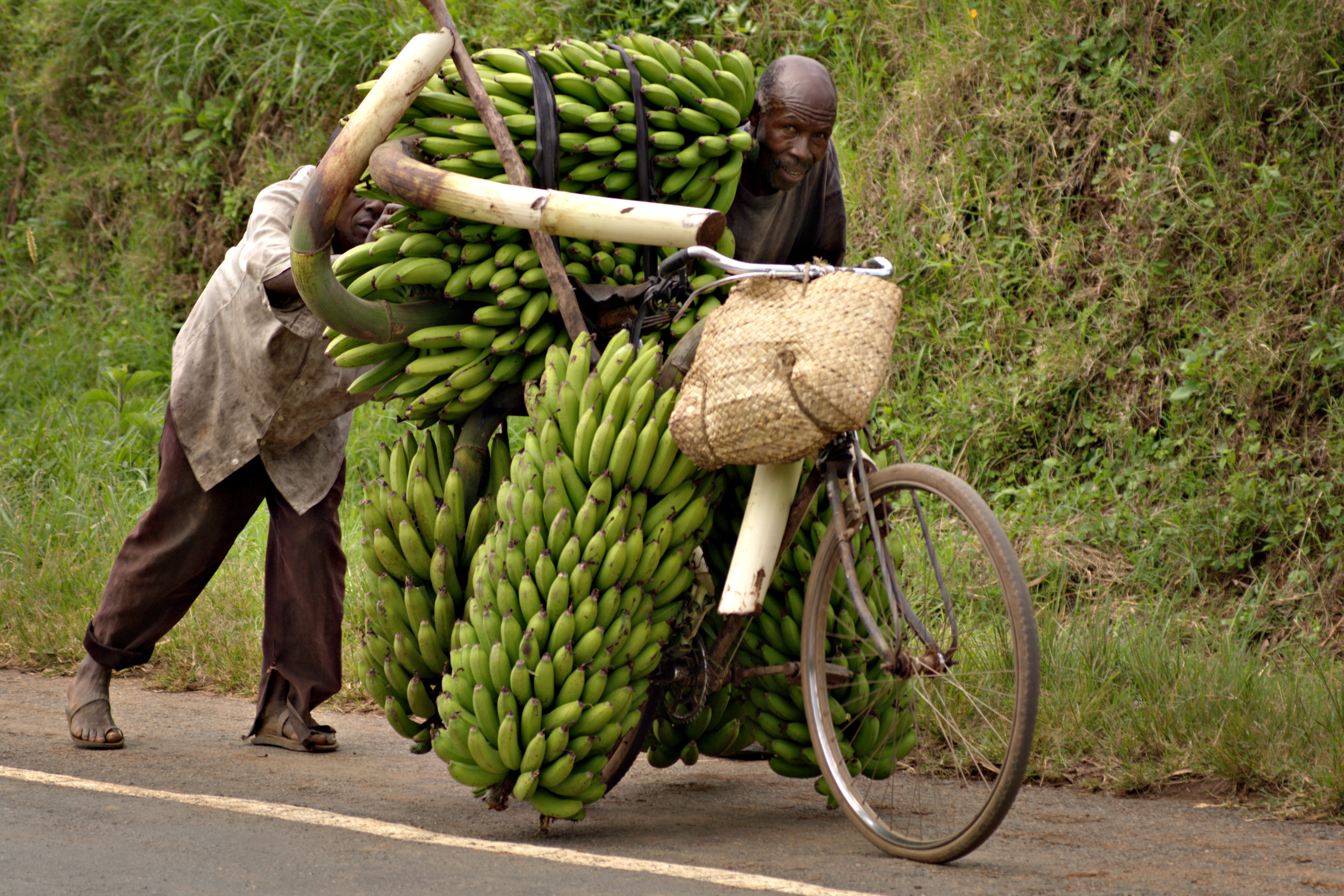
Men in Uganda using a bicycle to transport bananas

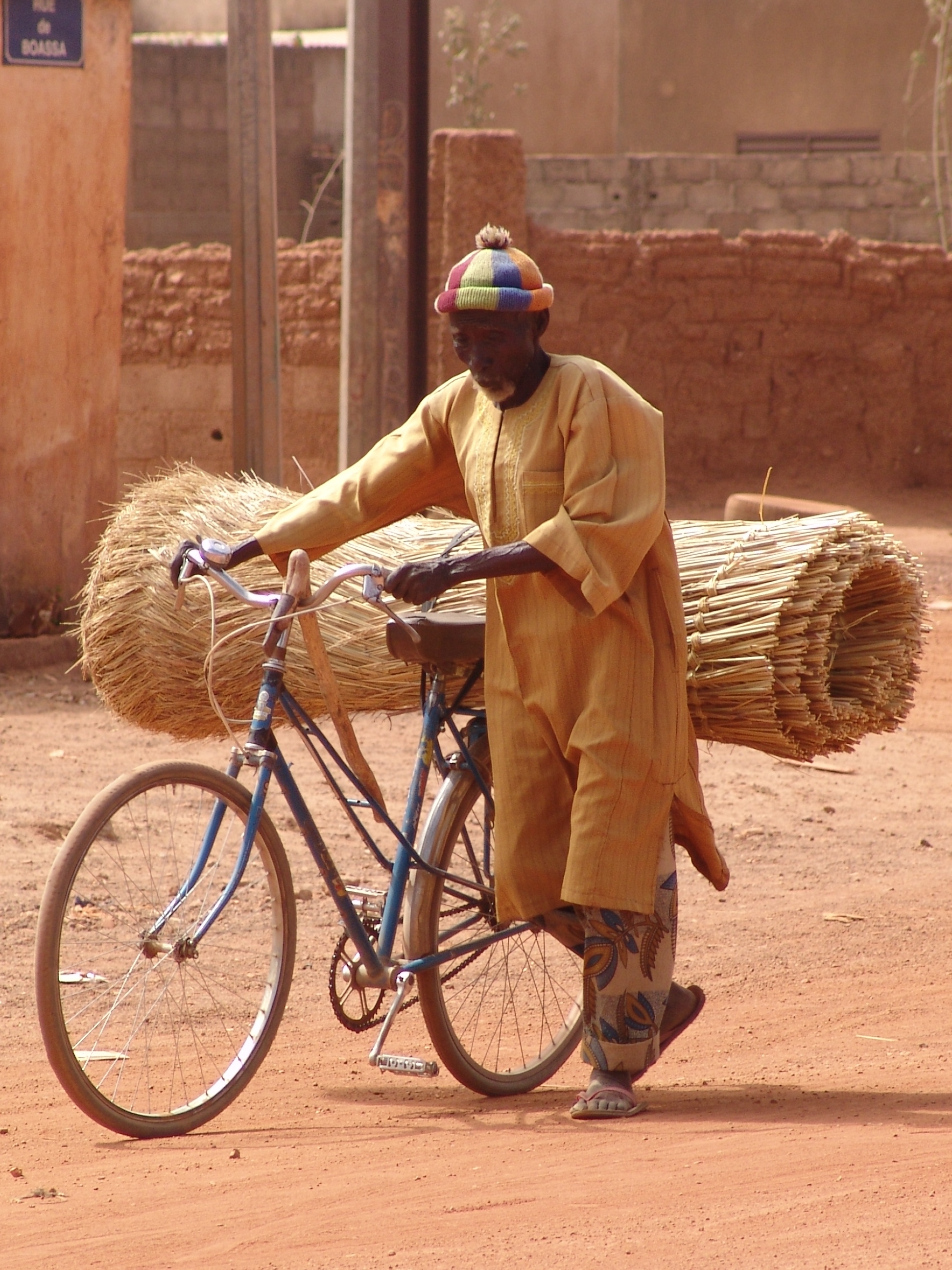
A man uses a bicycle to carry goods in Ouagadougou, Burkina Faso

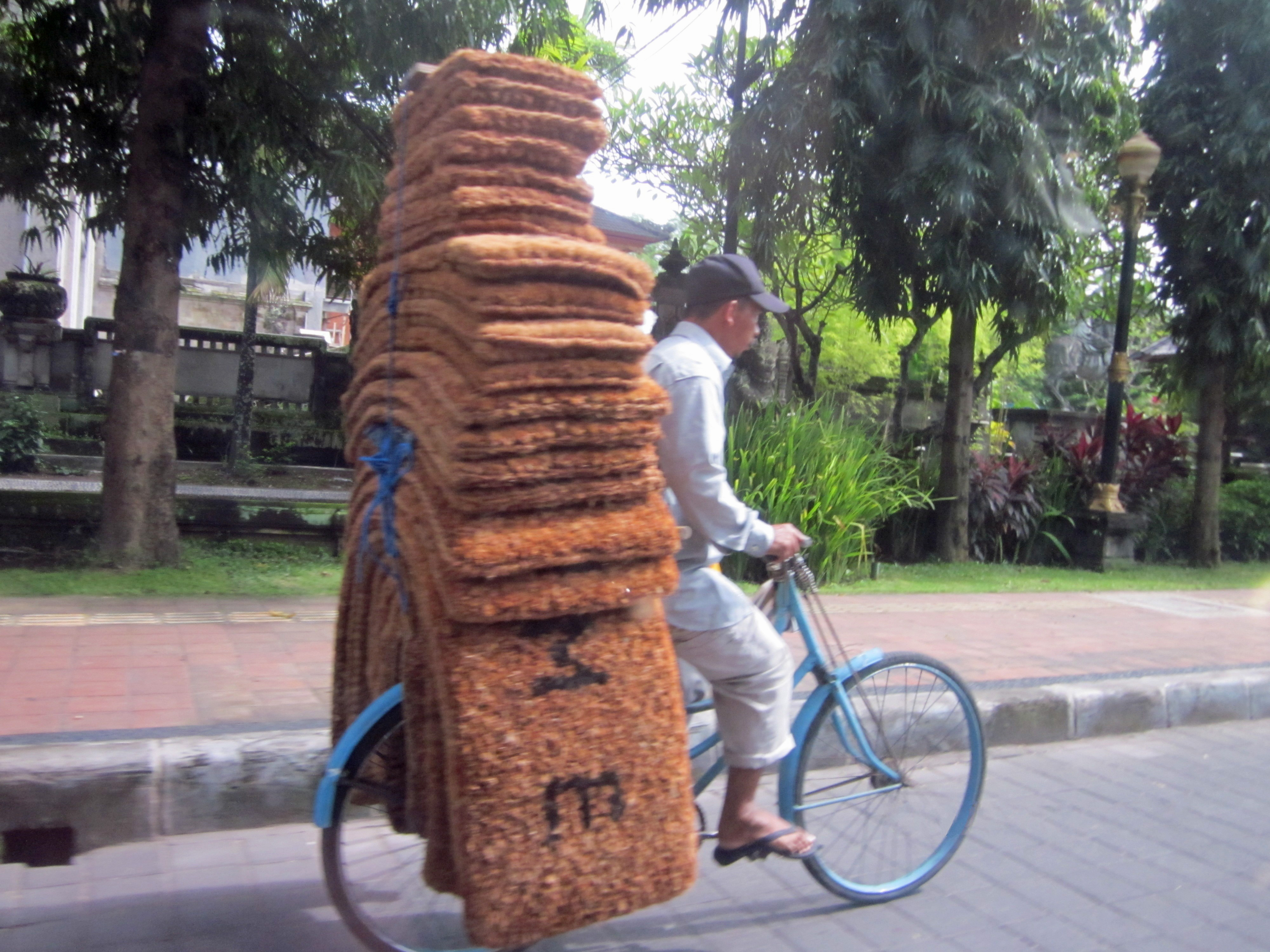
A man hauling coconut fiber doormats in Indonesia

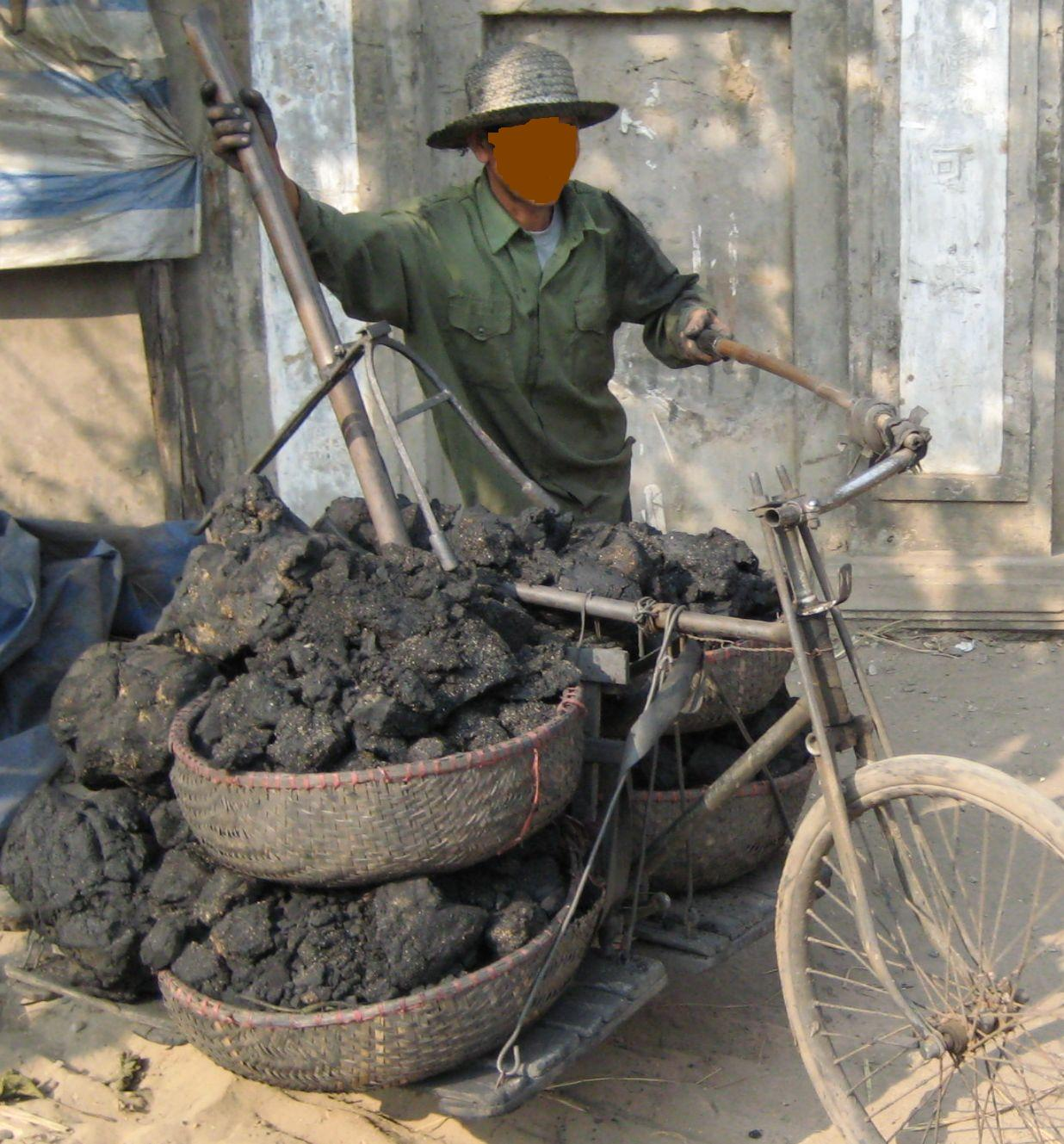
A man hauling material with a bicycle in Vietnam

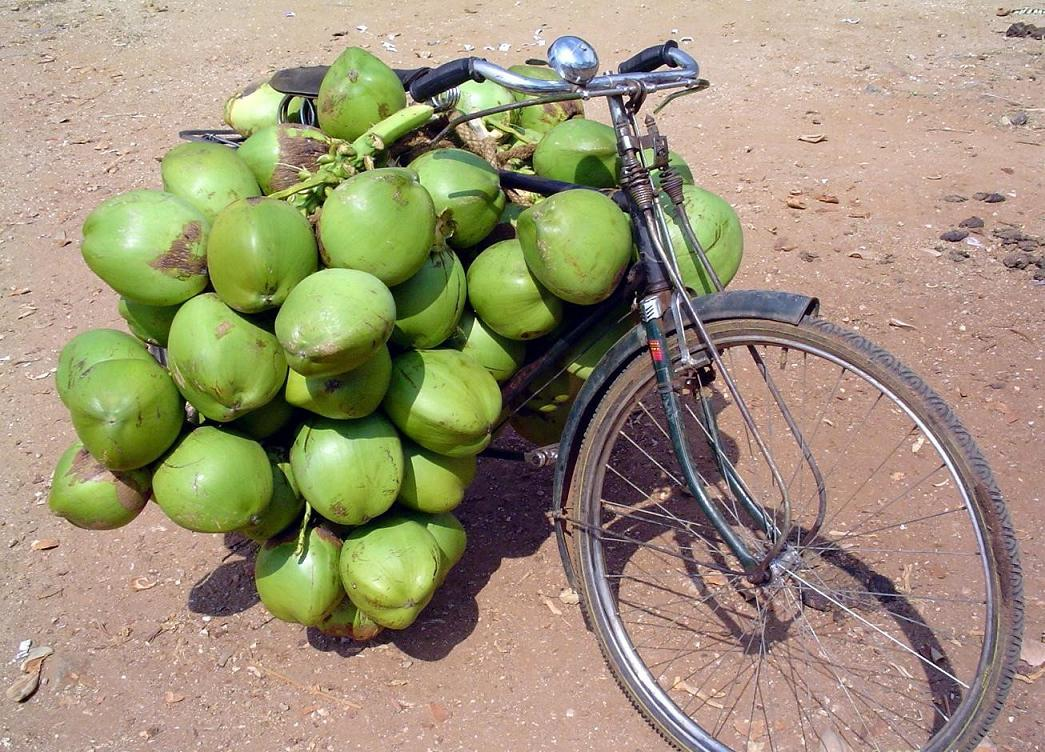
A bicycle in India hauling coconuts

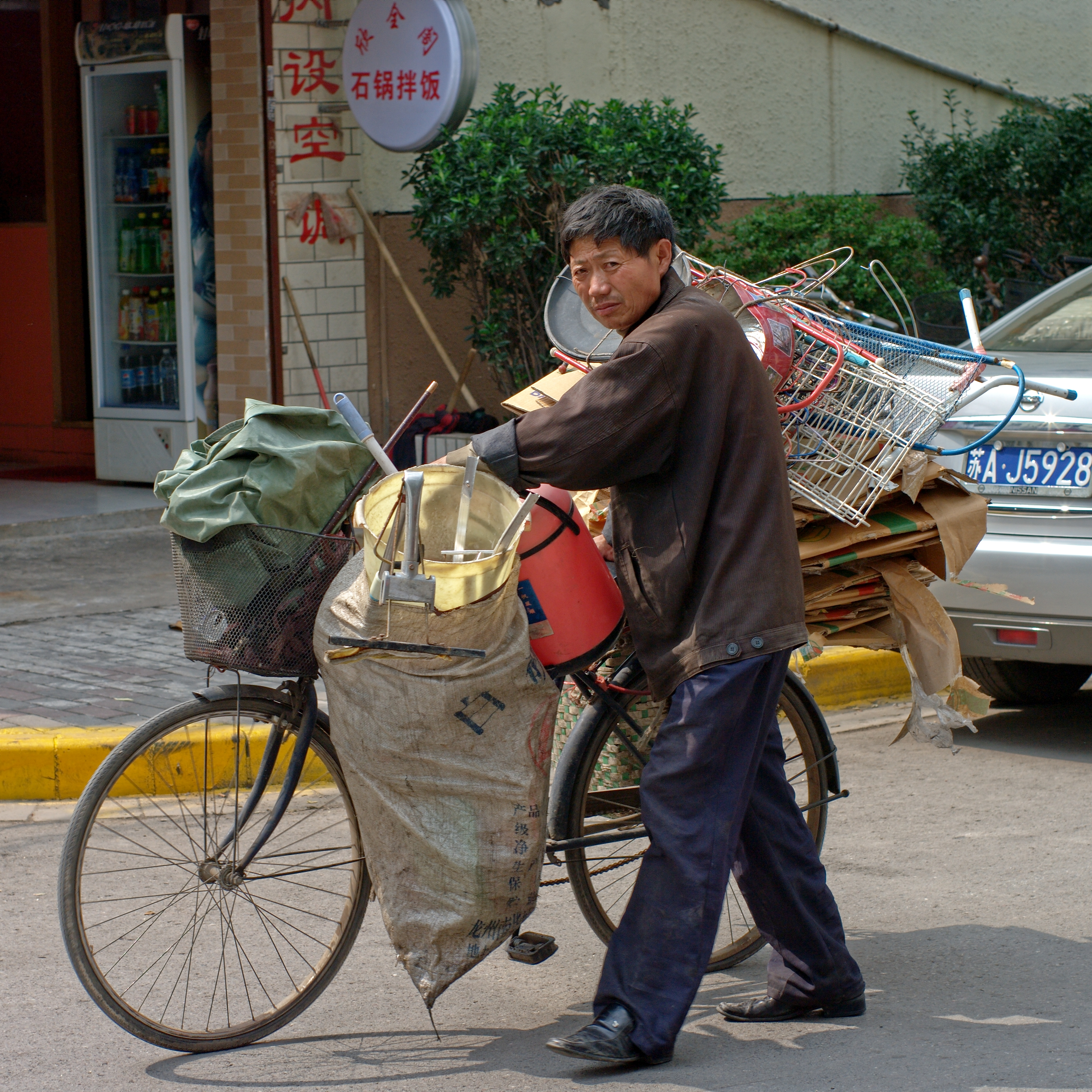
A man hauling scrap by bicycle in China

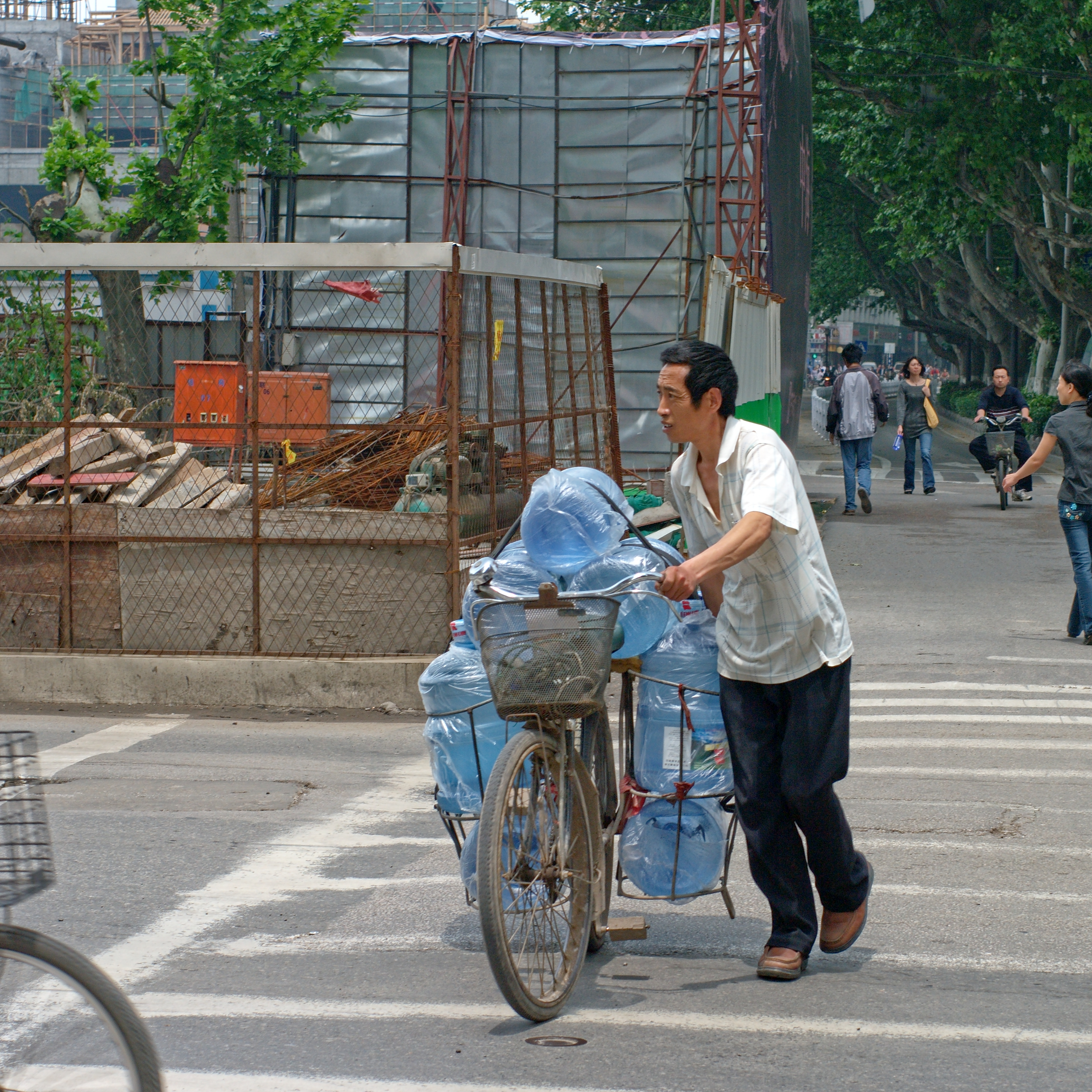
A man delivering water by bicycle in Nanjing, China

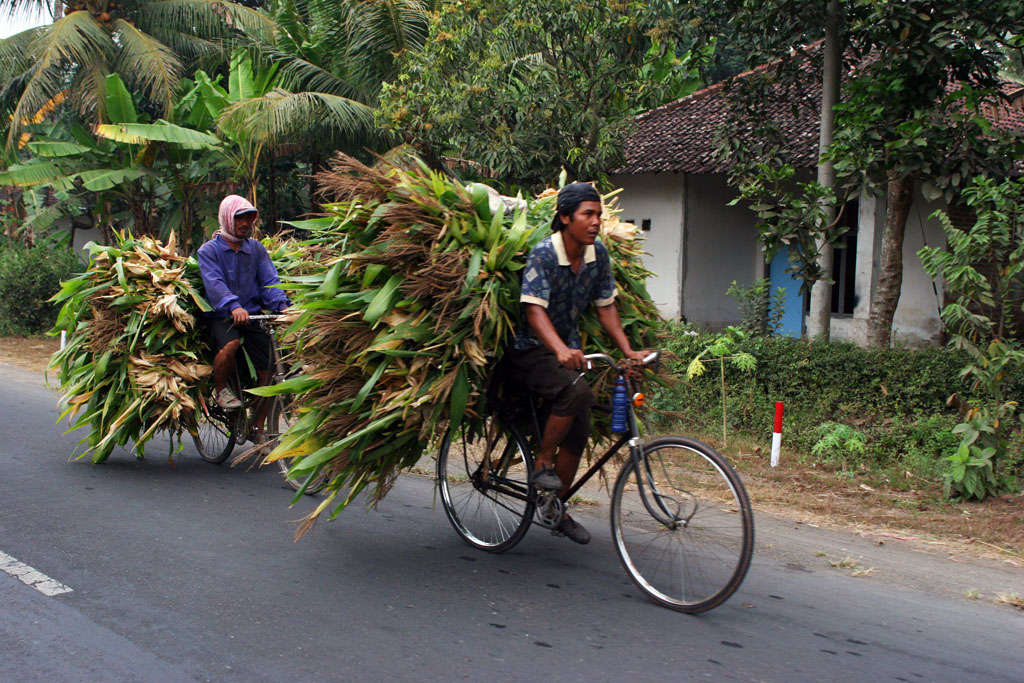
Farmers hauling corn stalks by bicycle in southeast Asia

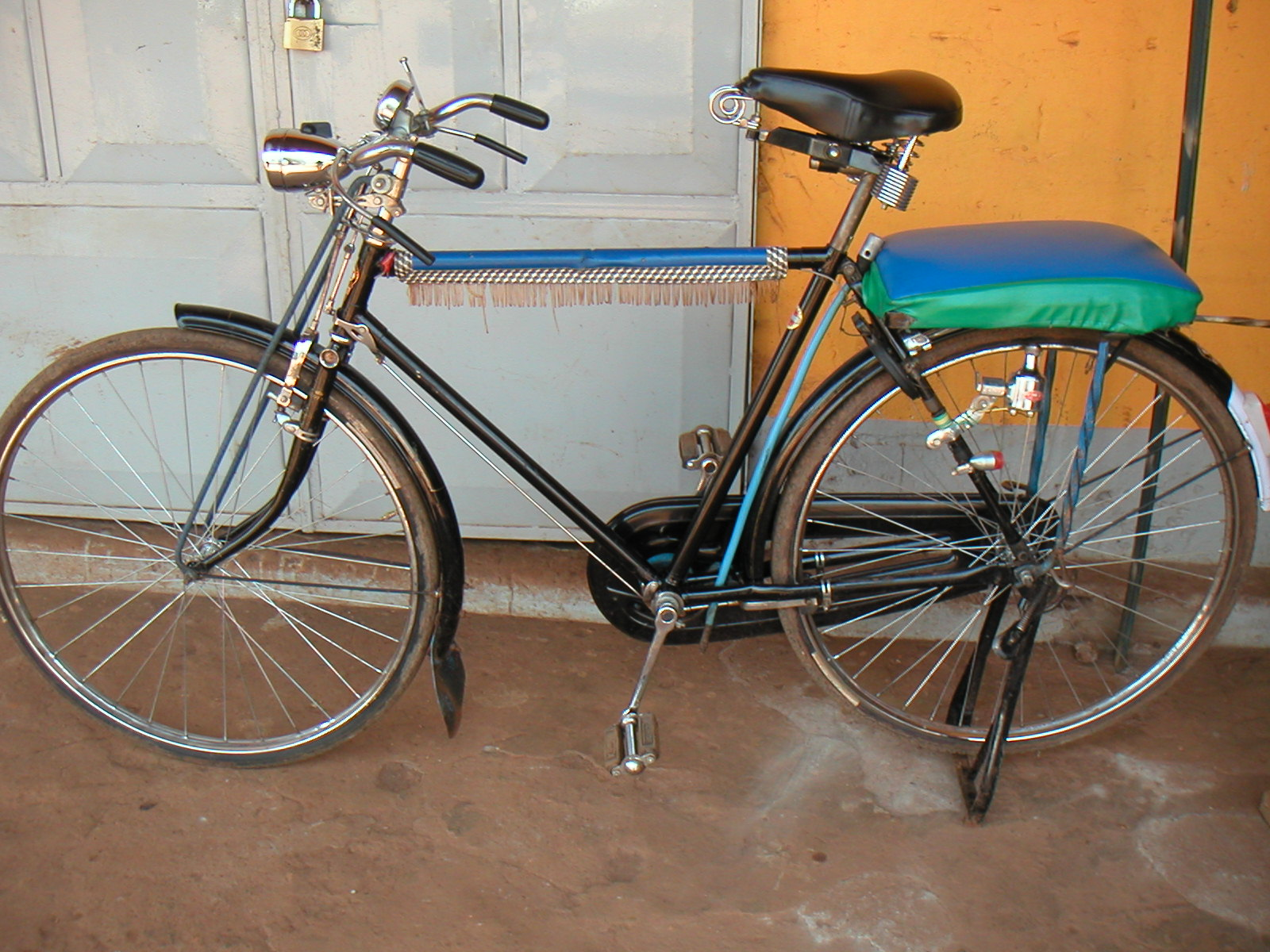
Bicycle Boda Boda in Uganda

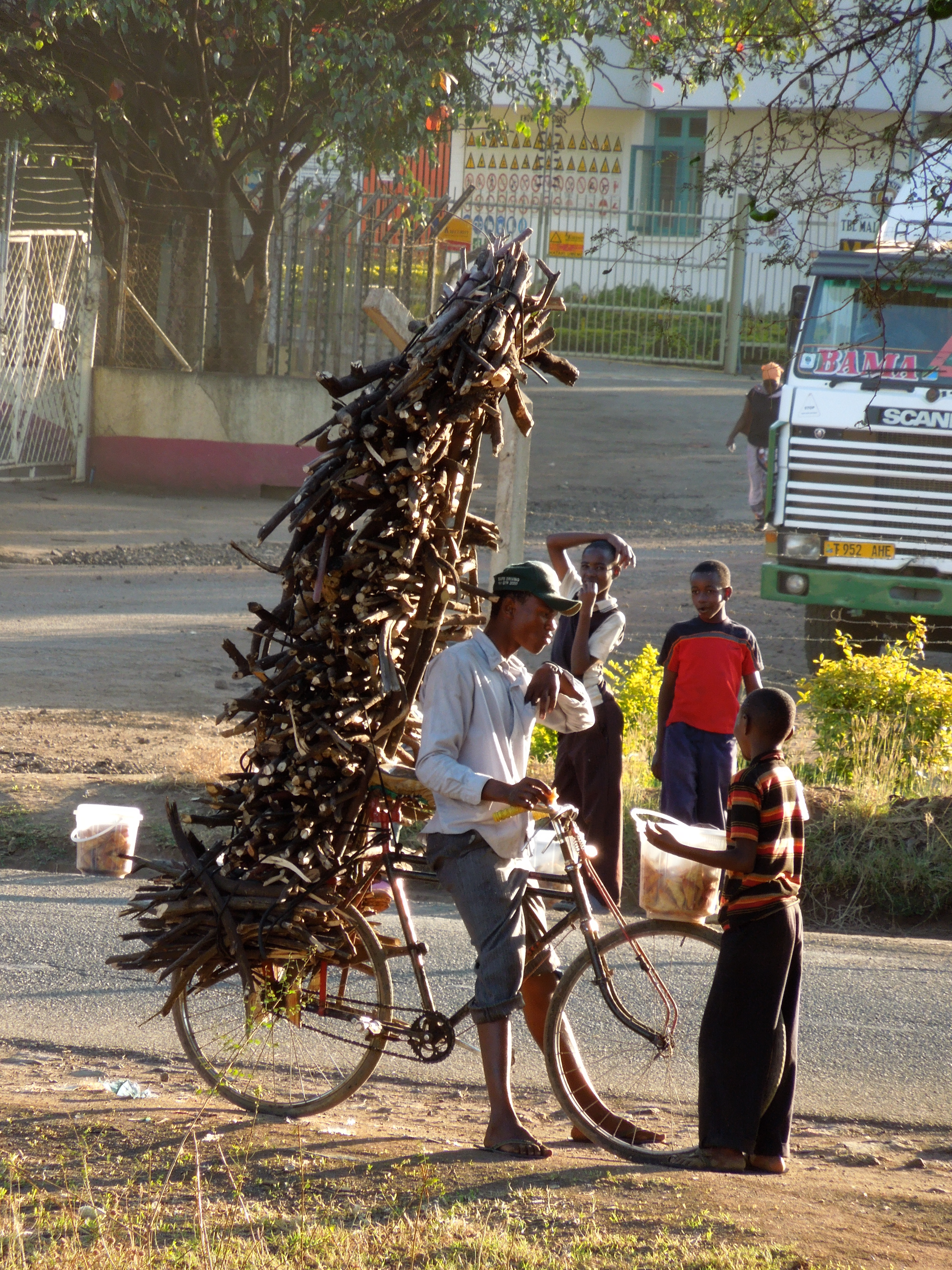
Hauling firewood by bicycle in Moshi, Tanzania

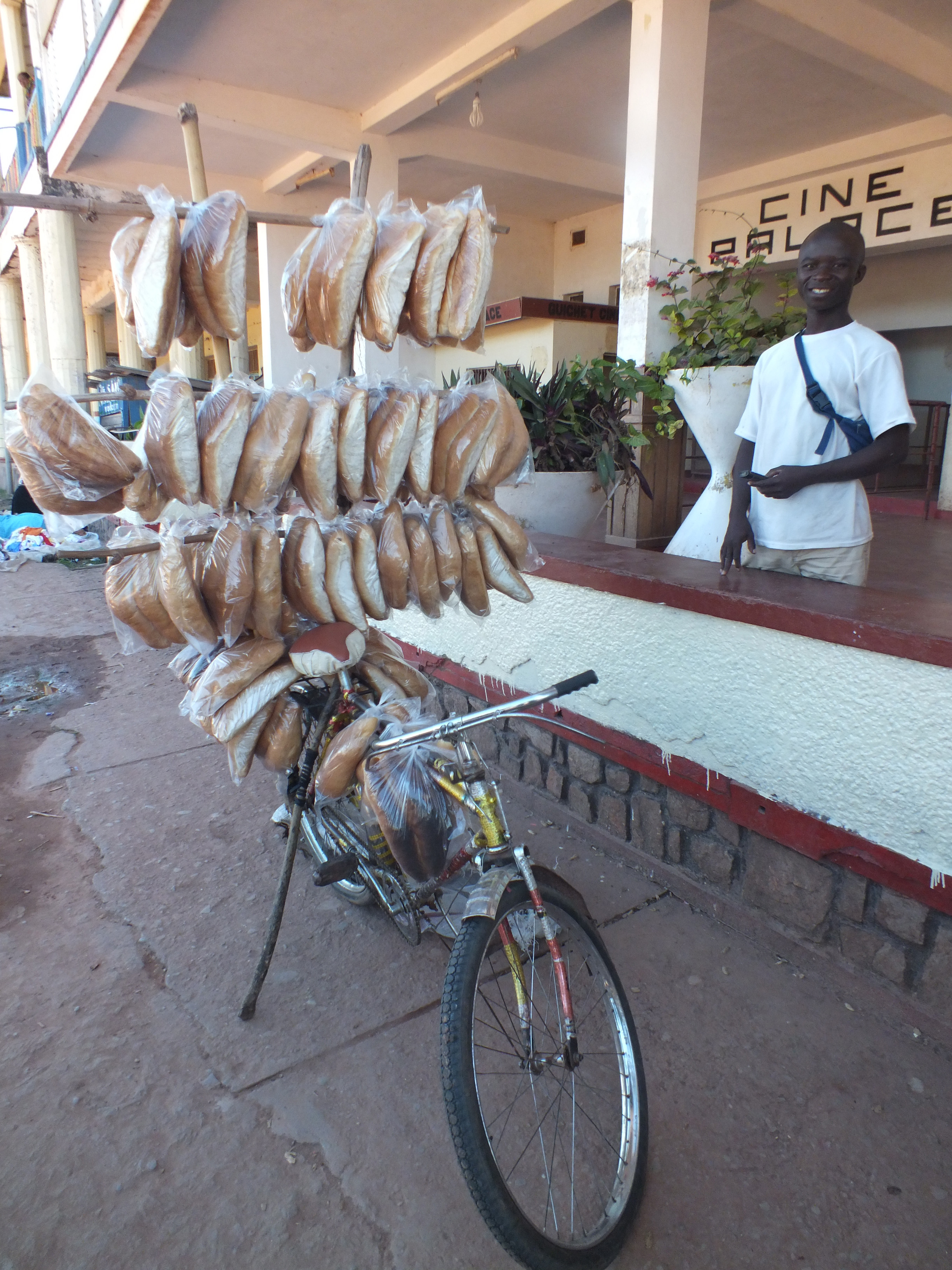
Distributing bread by bicycle near Lake Tanganyika in the Democratic Republic of the Congo

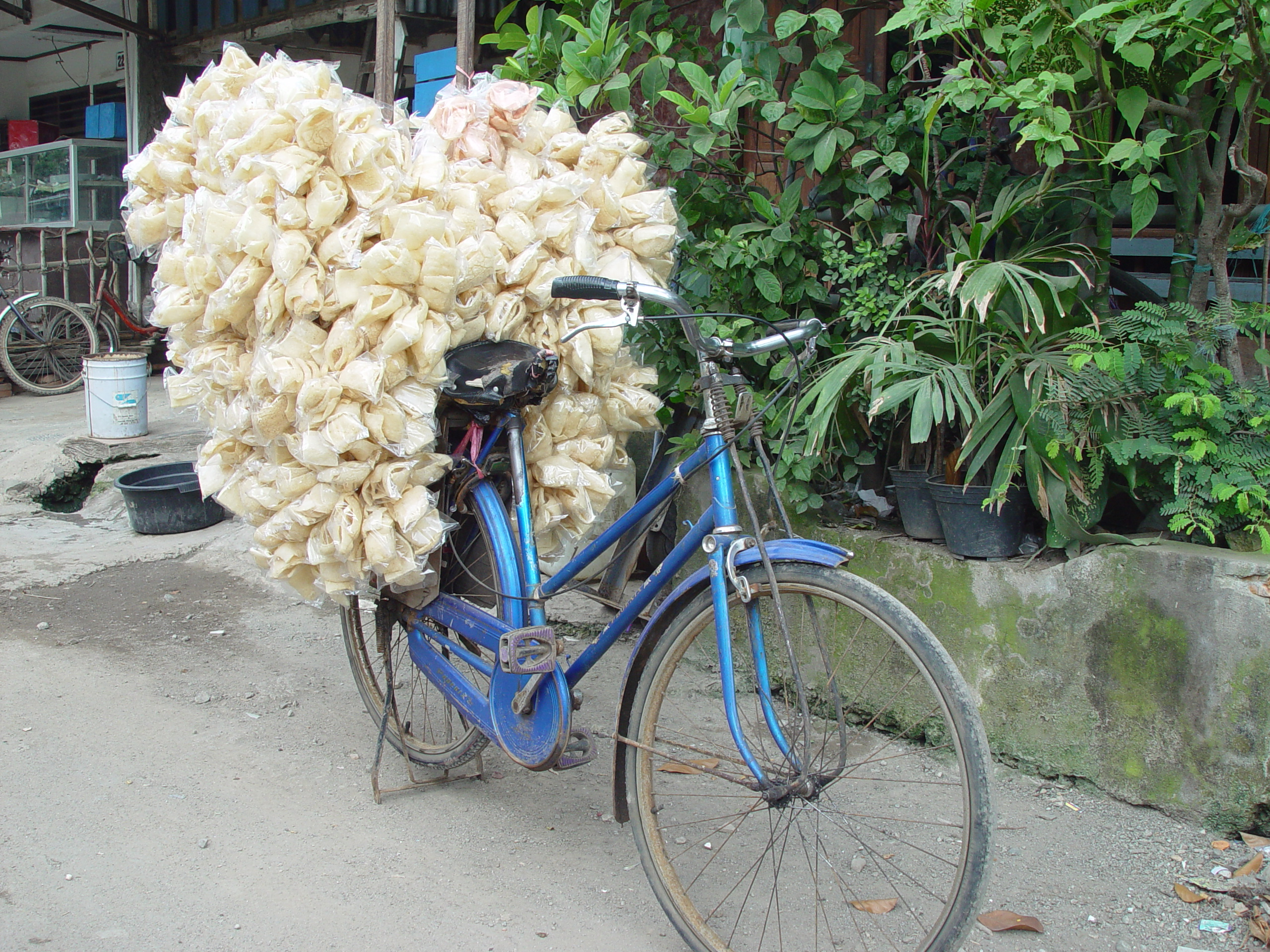
Cracker vender bicycle (sepeda karak) in North Jakarta, Indonesia

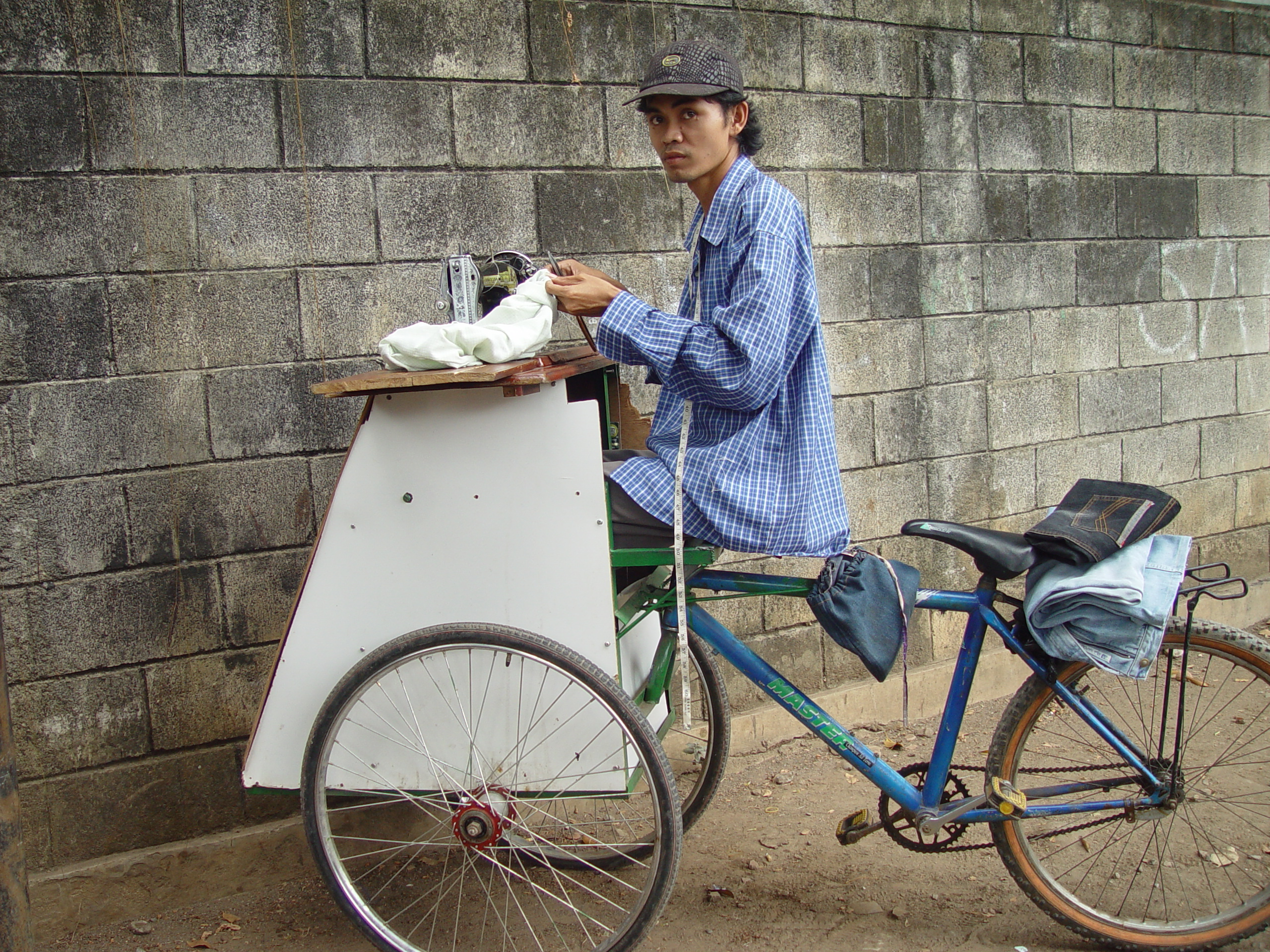
Sewing machine bicycle (sepeda penjahit) in Jakarta, Indonesia

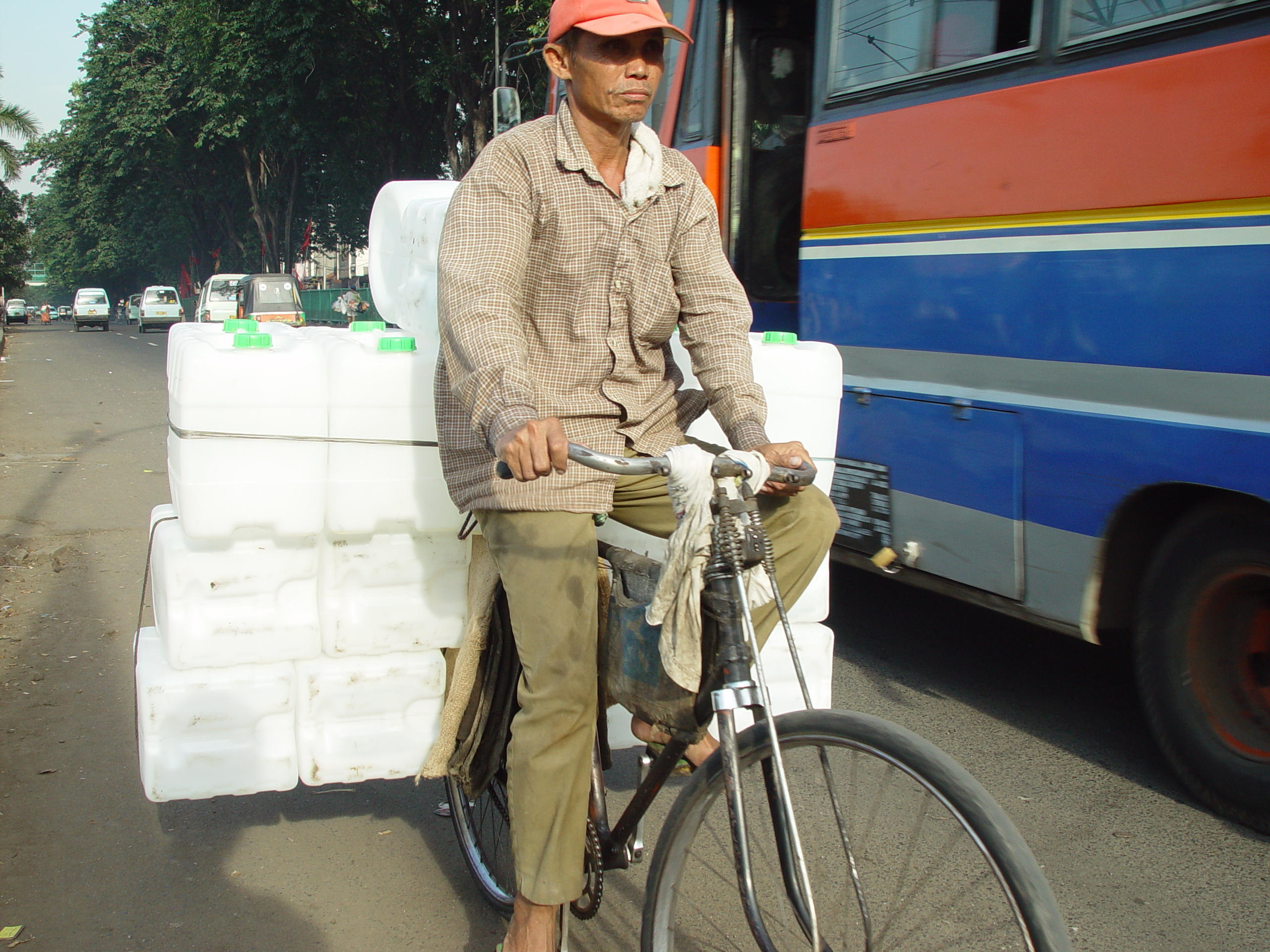
Water transportation by bicycle in Jakarta, Indonesia

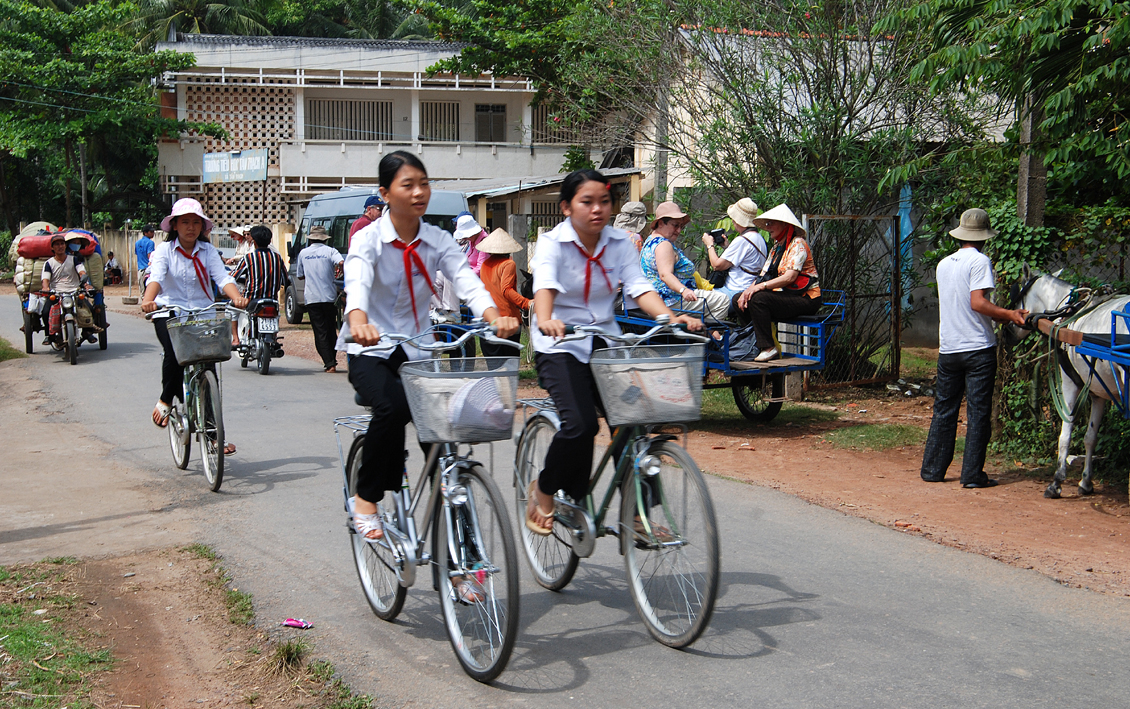
Girls going to school by bicycle in Saigon, Vietnam

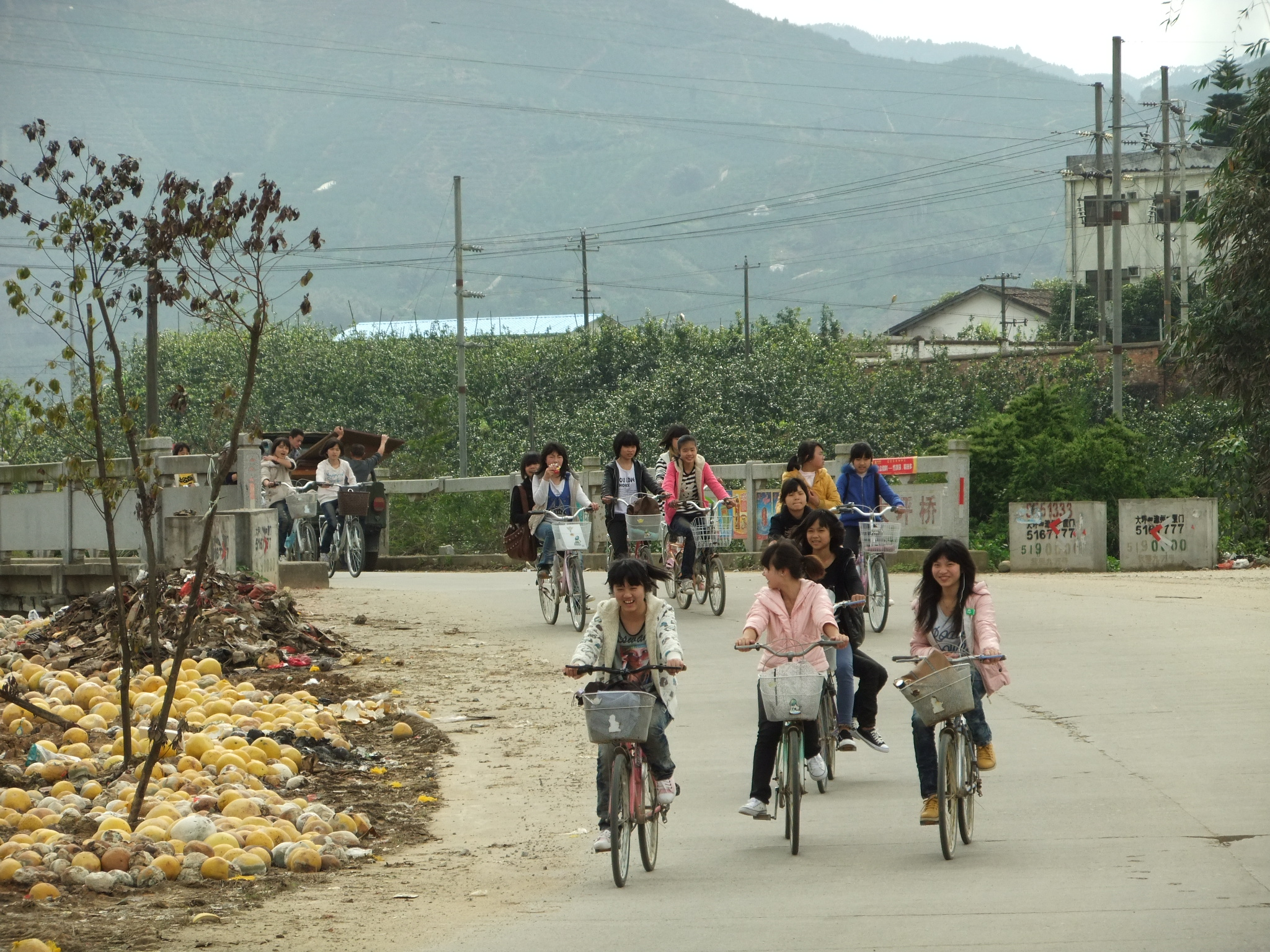
Children returning home from school by bicycle in Xiazhai, China

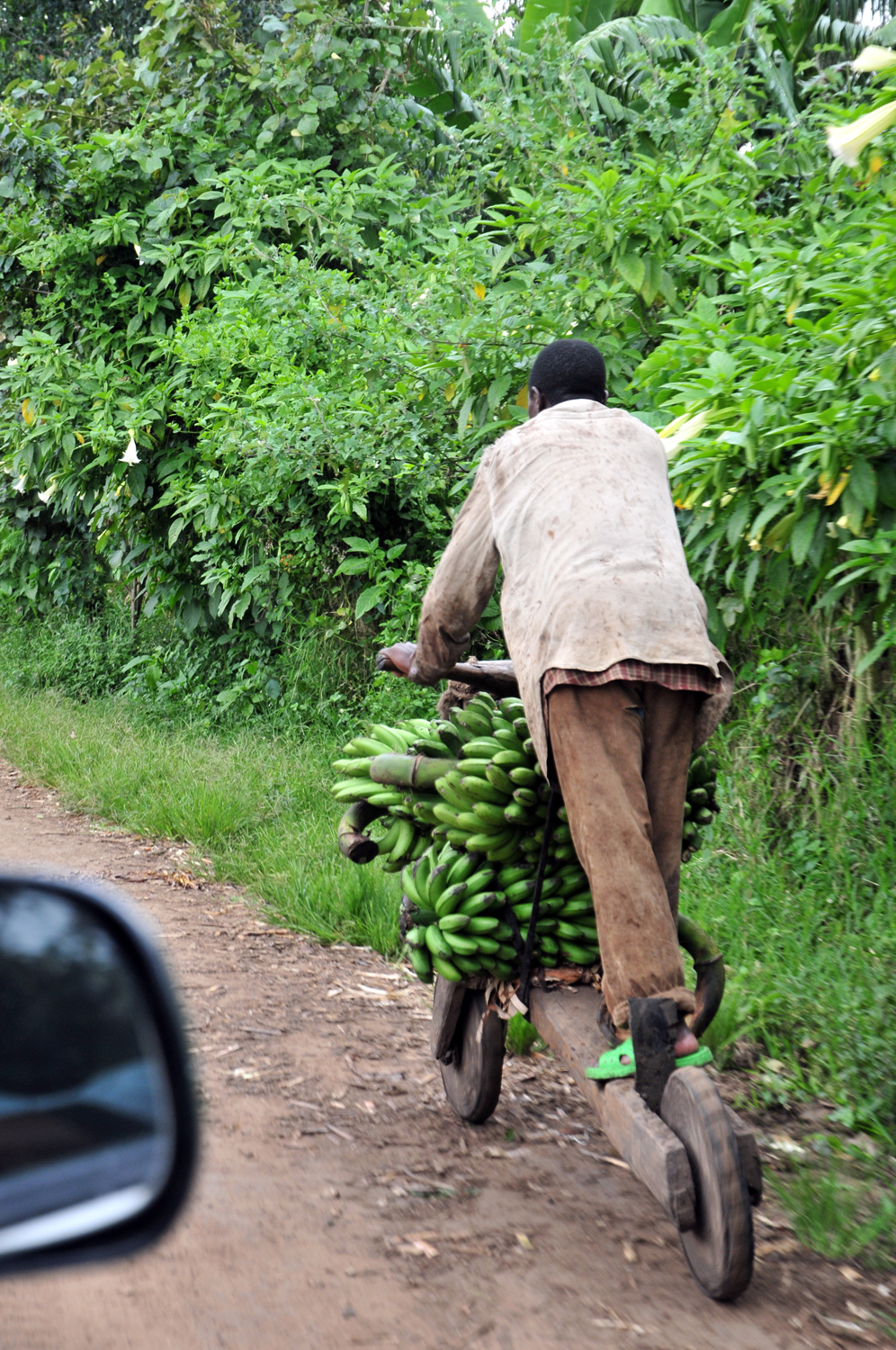
A man transporting bananas by chukudu in North Kivu

== See also ==
- Accessibility (transport)
- Baisikeli Ugunduzi
- Bikes Not Bombs
- Bikes to Rwanda
- BikeTown Africa
- Chukudu
- Pedaling to Freedom
- Transport divide
- With My Own Two Wheels
- World Bicycle Relief
