= Proviz Sports =

British sportswear retail company

Proviz
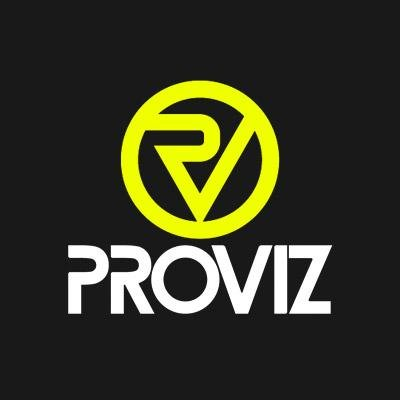
- Type: Private
- Industry: Retail; Wholesale
- Founded: 2008; 18 years ago in London, England
- Founders: Anthony Langly-Smith; Rupert Langly-Smith
- Headquarters: London, England
- Products: High-visibility clothing
- Website: www.provizsports.com

Proviz is a British company specialising in the design and production of high visibility and reflective sportswear and accessories for cycling and running.

== History ==
Proviz was founded in 2008 by two brothers Anthony and Rupert Langly Smith when they were both working in London and commuting to their respective jobs by bicycle. In 2008 they began to develop their own range of high visibility, reflective clothing for cycling and they launched their first five products in 2009.

In 2012, Proviz started working with Moore Large & Co Ltd, UK suppliers, and distributors of bicycles, bicycle accessories, and motorcycles. In July 2016 the company produced the Reflect360 CRS (Colour Reflective System).

In September 2016 Proviz opened its first US warehouse and launched a US website with the aim of selling directly to the American and Canadian public.

In May 2017 the company started a website for Australia working with Bike Parts Wholesale to distribute its products to third-party retailers in Australia. In October 2017 the company launched their German website and began working with outdoor equipment distributor Relags, bringing the Proviz brand to shops in mainland Europe for the first time.

In October 2018, Proviz celebrated their 10th Anniversary and they started a ‘Defy the Darkness’ campaign.

== Charity partnerships ==
From its early days in 2008, Proviz has partnered with the charity World Bicycle Relief, which provides Buffalo Bicycles to students, healthcare workers and entrepreneurs in rural Africa. They introduced a system where customers can support World Bicycle Relief’s work by hitting a button at the checkout to donate 50p. Proviz and their customers have provided the funds for 60 Buffalo Bicycles.

In 2014, Proviz sponsored The One Show’s Rickshaw Challenge for Children in Need. The challenge saw six young people - all of whom had benefitted from the work of Children in Need - pedal a rickshaw 450 miles, from Salford in Manchester to the EastEnders set in the fictional London borough of Walford.

== See also ==
- High-visibility clothing
