= Pedals for Progress =

American non-profit

Pedals for Progress (P4P) is a nonprofit organization based in New Jersey. P4P collects used bicycles and sewing machines and ships them to motivated people in the developing world. P4P seeks to spur economic development in developing countries by providing transportation for adults and children with bikes, and job opportunities in the sewing and tailoring business with sewing machines. The organization also seeks to reduce the number of bikes and sewing machines in landfills through these donations. As of 2023, P4P has sent more than 166,000 bikes and more than 6,000 sewing machines to partners in 48 countries.

P4P works with shipping companies that offer free initial shipping, with the goal of further bike shipments becoming profitable. Bicycle partner organizations typically have a bike shop that can make money selling and repairing the bikes they get. The bikes are then resold at a reduced price.

== History ==
Pedals for Progress was founded by David Schweidenback in 1991. Schweidenback served as a Peace Corps volunteer in Ecuador, where he noticed that his landlord, who was a carpenter, made more money than his peers because he had the only bicycle in the area and therefore spent less time traveling and more time working. When Schweidenback returned from the Peace Corps, he began collecting discarded bikes to be shipped abroad.

== See also ==
- Bikes Not Bombs
- World Bicycle Relief
