= Rural poverty =

Poverty in rural areas, which are often less developed than urban areas worldwide

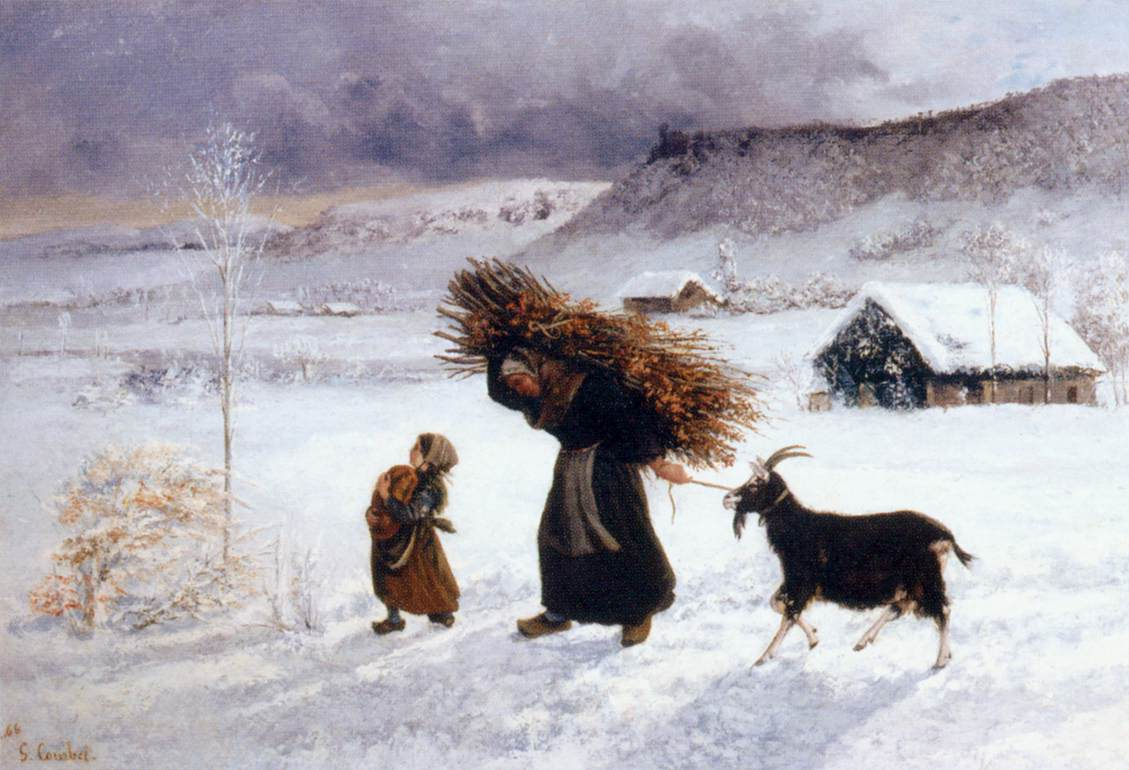
Gustave Courbet depicted nineteenth century rural poverty in this painting.

Rural poverty refers to situations where people living in non-urban regions are in a state or condition of lacking the financial resources and essentials for living. It takes account of factors of rural society, rural economy, and political systems that give rise to the marginalization and economic disadvantage found there. Rural areas, because of their small, spread-out populations, typically have less well maintained infrastructure and a harder time accessing markets, which tend to be concentrated in population centers.

Rural communities also face disadvantages in terms of legal and social protections, with women and marginalized communities frequently having a harder time accessing land, education and other support systems that help with economic development. Several policies have been tested in both developing and developed economies, including rural electrification and access to other technologies such as internet, gender parity, and improved access to credit and income.

In academic studies, rural poverty is often discussed in conjunction with spatial inequality, which in this context refers to the inequality between urban and rural areas. Both rural poverty and spatial inequality are global phenomena, but like poverty in general, there are higher rates of rural poverty in developing countries than in developed countries.

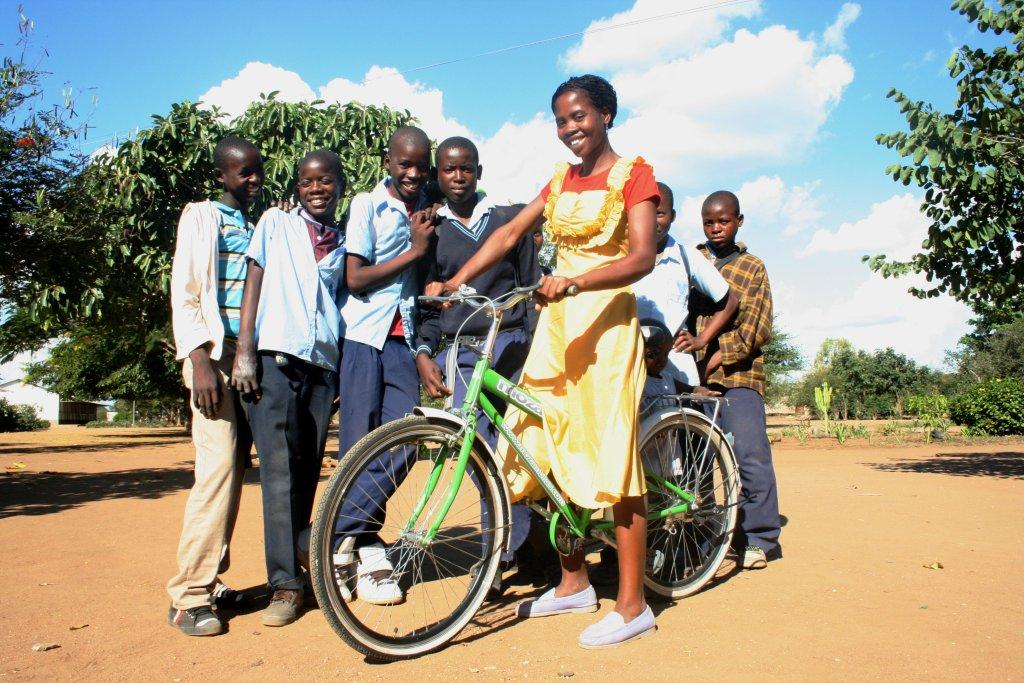
Many parts of rural Africa, such as this community in Mozambique, experience rural poverty. This woman was given access to a bicycle through a rural development program through a Bicycle poverty reduction program. Access to affordable transportation has been a key part of gaining access to greater economic mobility in many parts of the world. For example, distributing bicycles was one of the key strategies used by China to reduce rural poverty in the 20th century.

Eradicating rural poverty through effective policies and economic growth is a continuing difficulty for the international community, as it invests in rural development. According to the International Fund for Agricultural Development, 70 percent of the people in extreme poverty are in rural areas, most of whom are smallholders or agricultural workers whose livelihoods are heavily dependent on agriculture. These food systems are vulnerable to extreme weather, which is expected to affect agricultural systems the world over more as climate change increases.

Thus the climate crisis is expected to reduce the effectiveness of programs reducing rural poverty and cause displacement of rural communities to urban centers. Sustainable Development Goal 1: No Poverty sets international goals to address these issues, and is deeply connected with investments in a sustainable food system as part of Sustainable Development Goal 2: Zero Hunger.

== Prevalence ==
A graphic from Our World in Data representing national evaluations of rural poverty.

The first target of the Millennium Development Goals was to decrease the extent of extreme poverty by one-half by the year 2015, which was achieved globally before its deadline in 2010. By 2011, this MDG target was achieved in all developing regions, with the exception of sub-Saharan Africa. However the International Fund for Agricultural Development reported that the world progress in cutting extreme poverty in rural areas lagged behind that of urban areas. Between the 1990s and the 2010s, more than 800 million people escaped "moderate poverty" – defined as living on less than US$3.10 a day.

An analysis by the Food and Agriculture Organization of the United Nations (FAO) found that the urban poor exited poverty at faster rates than the rural poor between the 1990s and 2010s, but the overall rural poverty reduction varied by region. Only in East and Southeast Asia had rural poverty been substantially reduced, where the share of the rural non-poor in total population increased from 9 percent in the 1990s to 33 percent in the 2010s. The poverty rates in South Asia and sub-Saharan Africa in the 1990s were comparable with those of East and Southeast Asia, but both urban and rural poor in both regions only modestly reduced. On the other hand, Latin America and the Caribbean and the Near East and North Africa had low overall moderate poverty rates even in the 1990s, and over the course of the studied decades, the exit from poverty was mainly in urban areas. Estimates from 2016 indicate that 58 percent of Latin America's poor live in urban centres, compared with rates of 25–30 percent in other regions.

Changes in the proportions of rural and urban poor and non-poor

Estimates from the 2021 edition of the Rural Development Report found that globally 627 million people lived in extreme poverty, of which 70 percent (437 million people) were in rural areas. Moderate poverty was also most concentrated in rural areas, with 74% in rural area. Sub-Saharan Africa and South Asia are the regions facing the highest rates of extreme and moderate poverty in both urban and rural areas.

== Contributing factors ==
=== Lack of infrastructure ===
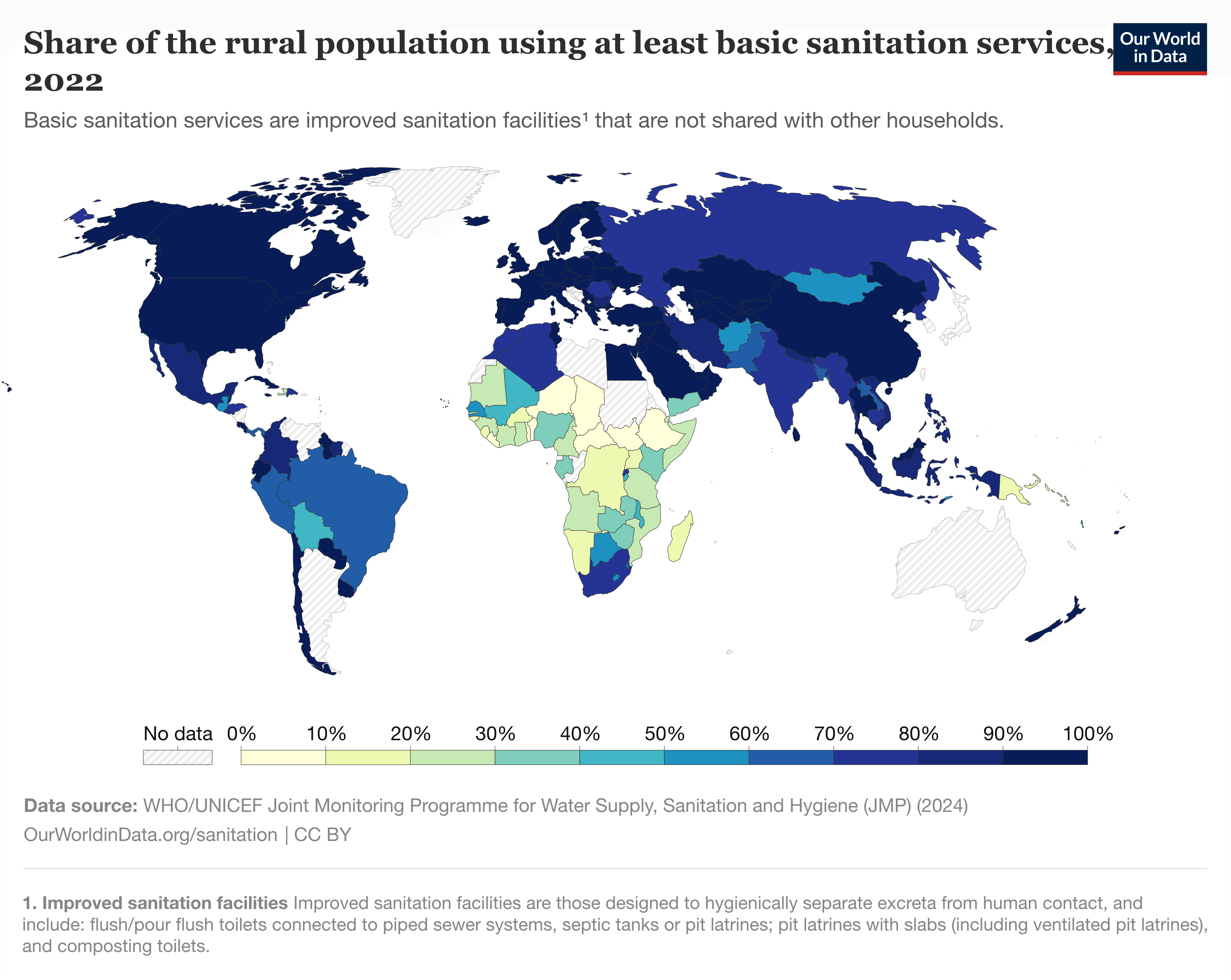
Access to health and water infrastructure is crucial for rural communities to overcome challenges like poverty. However, the uneven economic production of rural communities, mean that they may be less likely to get infrastructure investment such as sanitation infrastructure.

Rural poverty is often a product of poor infrastructure that hinders development and mobility. Rural areas tend to lack sufficient roads that would increase access to agricultural inputs and markets. Without roads, the rural poor are cut off from technological development and emerging markets in more urban areas. Poor infrastructure hinders communication, resulting in social isolation among the rural poor, many of whom have limited access to media and news outlets. Such isolation hinders integration with urban society and established markets, which could result in greater development and economic security. Moreover, poor or nonexistent irrigation systems threaten agricultural yields because of uncertainty in the supply of water for crop production. Many poor rural areas lack any irrigation to store or pump water, resulting in fewer crops, fewer days of employment and less productivity. Both a lack of roads and insufficient irrigation systems result in greater Work Intensity in many rural communities.

Researchers at the ODI conducted a literature review to assess the relationship between all types of roads and both their security impacts and the effects of road building on access to for example health and education (service delivery) particularly in fragile, sparsely populated and/or ill-served rural areas in developing countries.

They found no direct evidence relating to the security impact of road infrastructure, and that only theoretical linkages of infrastructure development are discussed in studies. There are various direct and indirect channels through which transport infrastructure may affect security and peace building. They agree that infrastructure programmes can potentially play three roles in a fragile context: as an engine of economic recovery and improved service provision, as part of a process of strengthening institutions, and in stabilisation and peace-building.

They claim the state of evidence regarding these causal links is weak but some aspects of infrastructure development, including but not exclusive to road construction, has been shown to be effective in fragile country contexts. Quick Impact has not yet proven to be effective in enhancing peace building and security in Fragile and Conflict Affected States.

Their literature search presented some evidence of road development resulting in employment sometimes for the most vulnerable and/or poor groups. They found case studies show road development programmes can produce short-term employment opportunities in fragile and conflict affected regions particularly applying to programmes where rural road development is carried out through community-driven development or with special emphasis on inclusion through participatory methods. Evidence is mostly limited to number of hours of employment generated or individuals employed and include little rigorous impact evaluation.

There was also some evidence that rural road construction reduced isolation for minority groups and provided more opportunities for inclusion in wider economic activity. However, this evidence did not relate directly to reducing conflict or improving security. Poverty and isolation literature defines this as access to inputs and output markets, access to education and health services, and access to labour opportunities through which road access contributes to reduced poverty.

Mostly qualitative evidence found suggests that rural road construction or maintenance has a positive impact on public service delivery. In general rural road development leads to improved access of both users and suppliers. This occurs due to a reduction in commuting time, as well transport costs but these benefits tend to accrue disproportionately to the influential and well-educated. Rural communities tend to ascribe great importance to road development and perceive it to improve access to markets, health and education facilities.

=== Geographic barriers ===
Moreover, poverty may be conduced by geographic barriers. Certain regions find themselves situated within inhospitably rigid geographic landscapes, rendering development virtually unattainable. Inhabitants of these areas typically contend with a lack of access to basic necessities and are sometimes neglected by financially-strung governments; authorities may show little interest in advancing the development of such areas, thereby subjecting the local populace to the adverse consequences of poverty. Prominent geographic impediments—such as remote or diminutive islands, expansive archipelagoes, sparsely populated regions, and rugged terrains like the mountainous landscapes of the Himalayas and Andes—serve as formidable obstacles to development.

=== Insufficient access to markets ===
A lack of access to markets - whether due to poor infrastructure or productivity, limited education, or insufficient information - prevents access to both labor and capital. In many rural societies, there are few job opportunities outside of agriculture, often resulting in food and income insecurity due to the precarious nature of farming. Rural workers are largely concentrated in jobs such as owners-cultivators, tenant farmers, sharecroppers, informal care workers, agricultural day-laborers, and livestock herders. Without access to other labor markets, rural workers continue to work for extremely low wages in agricultural jobs that tend to have seasonal fluctuations and thus little income security. In addition to labor, the rural poor often lack access to capital markets and financial institutions, hindering their ability to establish savings and obtain credit that could be used to purchase working capital or increase their supply of raw materials. When coupled with scarce job opportunities, poor access to credit and capital perpetuates rural poverty.

==== Rural versus urban poverty in the US ====
In the United States, the poverty rate is both higher and more persistent in rural areas than urban areas. Rural workers are disadvantaged by lower wages and less access to better paying labor markets. As a result, underemployment and informal work are more prevalent in rural areas than urban areas. Where formal employment is found, it acts as less of a buffer against poverty. Among persistent poverty counties, 95 percent are rural, while only 2 percent are urban.

Additionally, because of the distribution of people in poverty in the United States, which typically consists of clusters in neighborhoods rather than a nationally even distribution, people who live in such areas where poverty is highly concentrated actually face more adversity than their own circumstances would otherwise provide; it has been found that the actual concentration of poverty further contributes to such things as poor health, higher crime, lower education rates (higher dropout rates), as well as lower employment rates, all when compared to those in poverty.

=== Lack of non-motorised load-carrying wheeled vehicles (handcarts and wheelbarrows) ===
Numerous international development organisations have studied, reported, recommended and agreed that lack of mobility impedes human progress and development. Yet there is very little evidence of anyone attempting to actually address and alleviate the problem by introducing handcarts and wheelbarrows into remote and rural areas where they would be most beneficial.

=== Opening up of economies to international trade ===
Some macro-level economic changes have been associated with an increase in spatial inequalities. There have been numerous studies showing a link between more open trade, accompanied by other neoliberal policies, and higher incidences of rural poverty and spatial inequalities In China, for example, greater trade openness provides at least partial explanation for more pronounced rural-urban disparities, and in Vietnam, trade liberalization has resulted in higher poverty rates in rural areas. Both of these nations demonstrate that despite greater openness and growth, spatial inequalities do not necessarily decrease accordingly with overall economic growth. Moreover, the promotion of export-oriented agriculture has been linked to decreased food security for rural populations.

=== Education and social service inadequacies ===
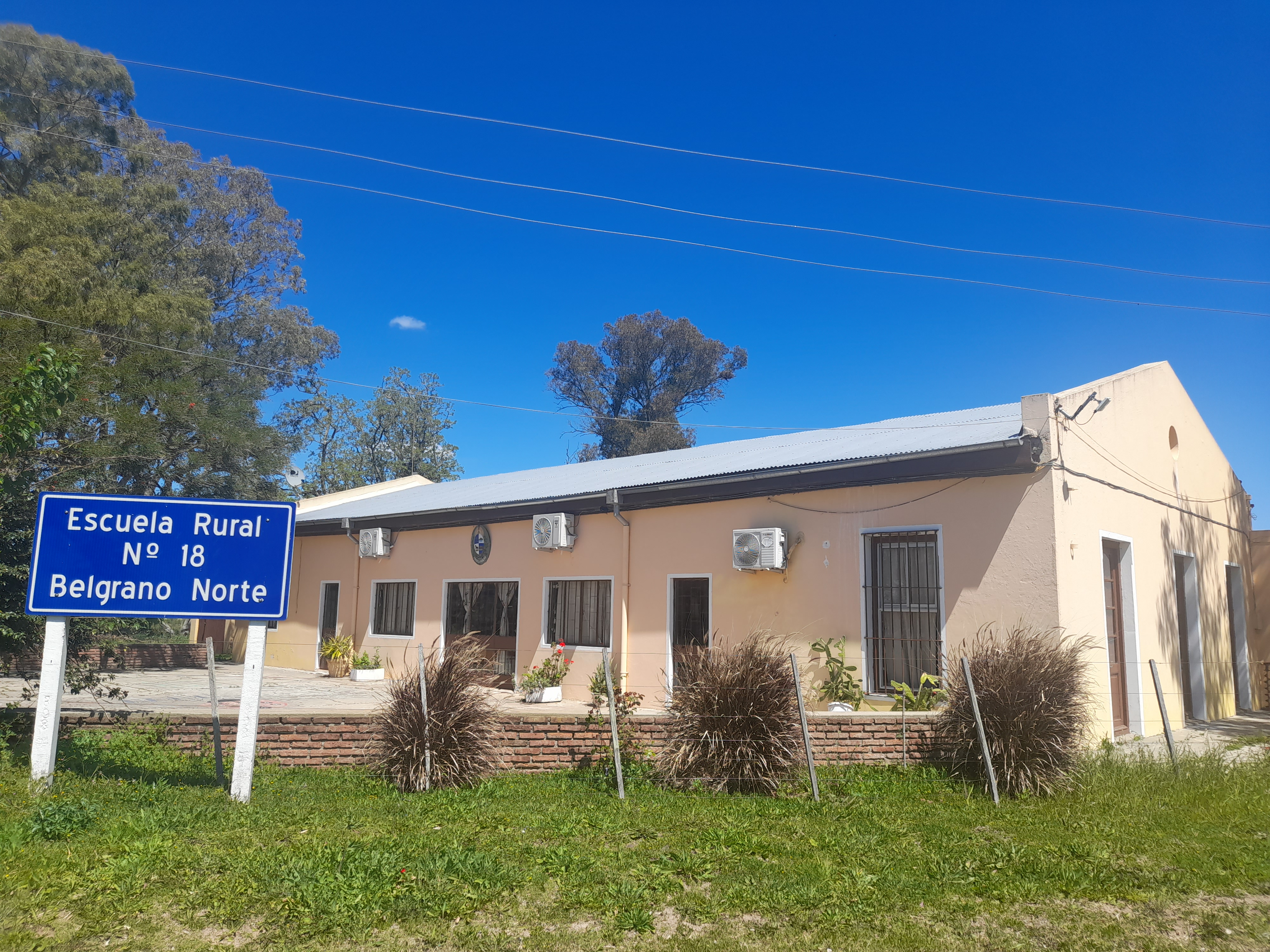
A rural school in Colonia Department, Uruguay. Uruguay invested in rural school infrastructure in the mid-20th century, by commissioning buildings from builders in rural communities, and ensuring that the schools had well trained teachers. This has created long-term changes to rural communities, allowing students greater access to social mobility.

In many rural societies, a lack of access to education and limited opportunities to increase and improve one's skillset inhibit social mobility. Low levels of education and few skills result in much of the rural poor working as subsistence farmers or in insecure, informal employment, perpetuating the state of rural poverty. Inadequate education regarding health and nutritional needs often results in under-nutrition or malnutrition among the rural poor.

Social isolation due to inadequate roads and poor access to information makes acquiring health care (and affording it) particularly difficult for the rural poor, resulting in worse health and higher rates of infant mortality. There have been noted disparities in both Asia and Africa between rural and urban areas in terms of the allocation of public education and health services.

==== Case study: Africa ====
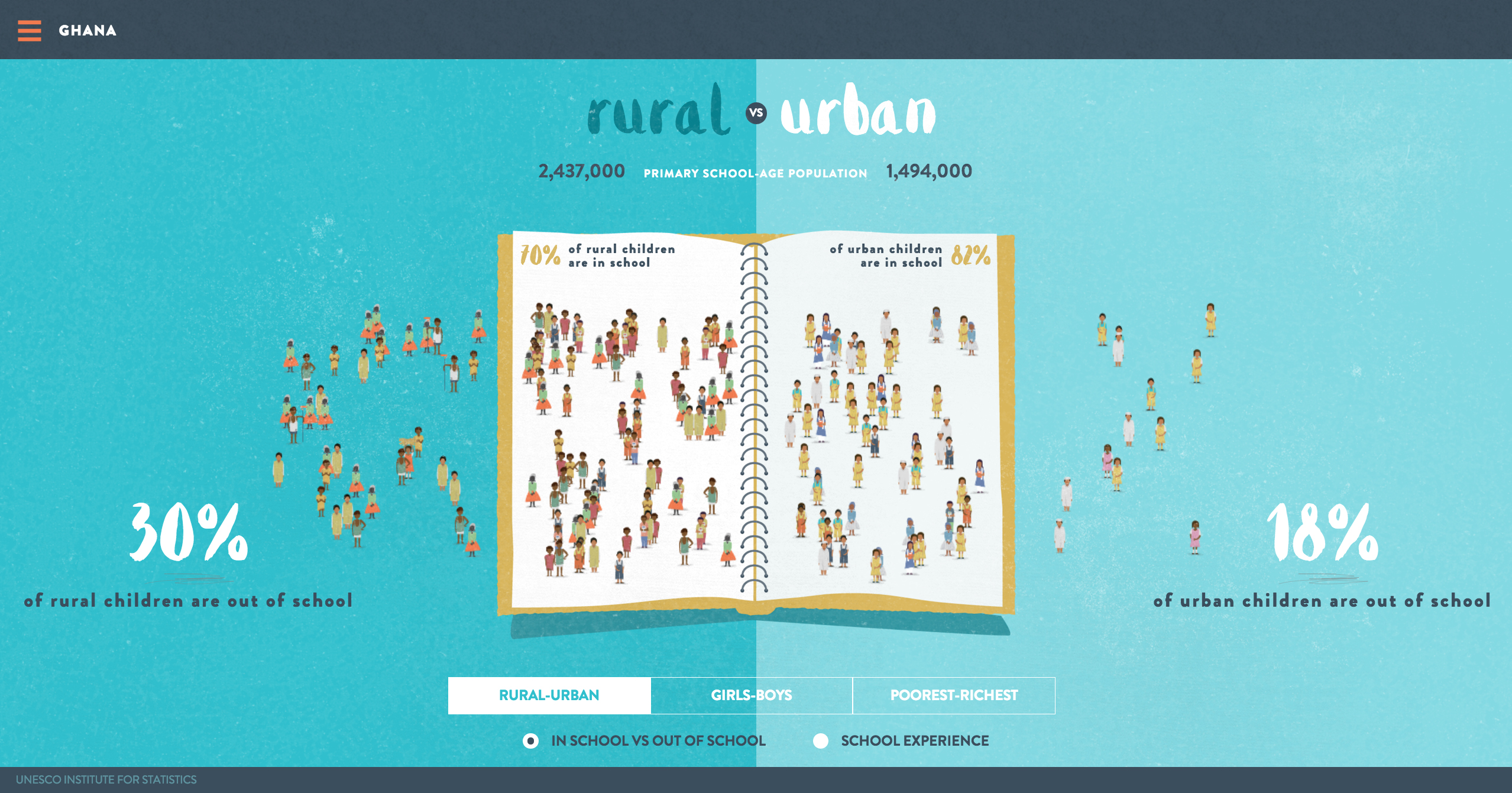
A graphic depicting the uneven participation of rural children in Education in Ghana. The combination of further distances, pressure to help families in their rural livelihoods, and less value for the results of education, lead to less participation in schools even where there are legal requirements.

A study of 24 African countries found that "standards of living in rural areas almost universally lag behind urban areas." In terms of education, school enrollments and the ratio of girl-to-boy enrollments is much lower in rural areas than in urban areas. A similar trend is found in access to neonatal care, as those living in rural areas had far less access to care than their urban counterparts.

There are also far more malnourished children in rural areas of Africa than in urban areas. In Zimbabwe, for example, more than twice the share of children are malnourished in rural areas (34 percent rate of malnourishment) than in urban areas (15 percent rate of malnourishment). Inequality between urban and rural areas, and where rural poverty is most prevalent, is in countries where the adult population has the lowest amount of education.

This was found in the Sahelian countries of Burkina Faso, Mali and Niger where regional inequality is 33 percent, 19.4 percent, and 21.3 percent, respectively. In each of these countries, more than 74 percent of the adults have no education. Overall, in much of Africa, those living in rural areas experience more poverty and less access to health care and education.

=== Agrifood systems and poverty ===
Quantified hidden costs of agrifood systems by cost category (left) and subcategory (right), 2020

Share of quantified hidden costs of agrifood systems to gdp by income group (hidden costs per capita on the right-hand side)

Despite an abundance of profits downstream in food supply chains, many workers in agrifood systems are poor. The Food and Agricultural Organization of the United Nations views this as a distributional failure as agrifood policies and institutional arrangements fail to guarantee a minimum level of decent income to all people employed by the agrifood systems, despite the availability of resources to do so. A study by FAO estimating the social, health and environmental hidden impacts of agrifood systems using True Cost Accounting (TCA) attributes US$520 billion in social hidden costs driven by poverty and US$51 billion from undernourishment in 2020 (out of a global total of US$12.7 trillion). These costs are most pronounced in low-income countries where they amount to more than 50 percent of all quantified hidden costs of agrifood systems. They are also noticeable in lower-middle-income countries where they amount to 12 percent of total agrifood systems hidden costs. When considered as a share of GDP, which gives a better sense of the burden placed on national economies and provides an indication as to where to prioritize international resources to address these costs, social hidden costs in low-income countries reach an estimated 14 percent.

FAO further estimates that, the incomes of the moderately poor working in agrifood systems need to increase, on average, by 57 percent in low-income countries and 27 percent in lower-middle-income countries to avoid distributional failure costs in agrifood systems.

== Women and rural poverty ==
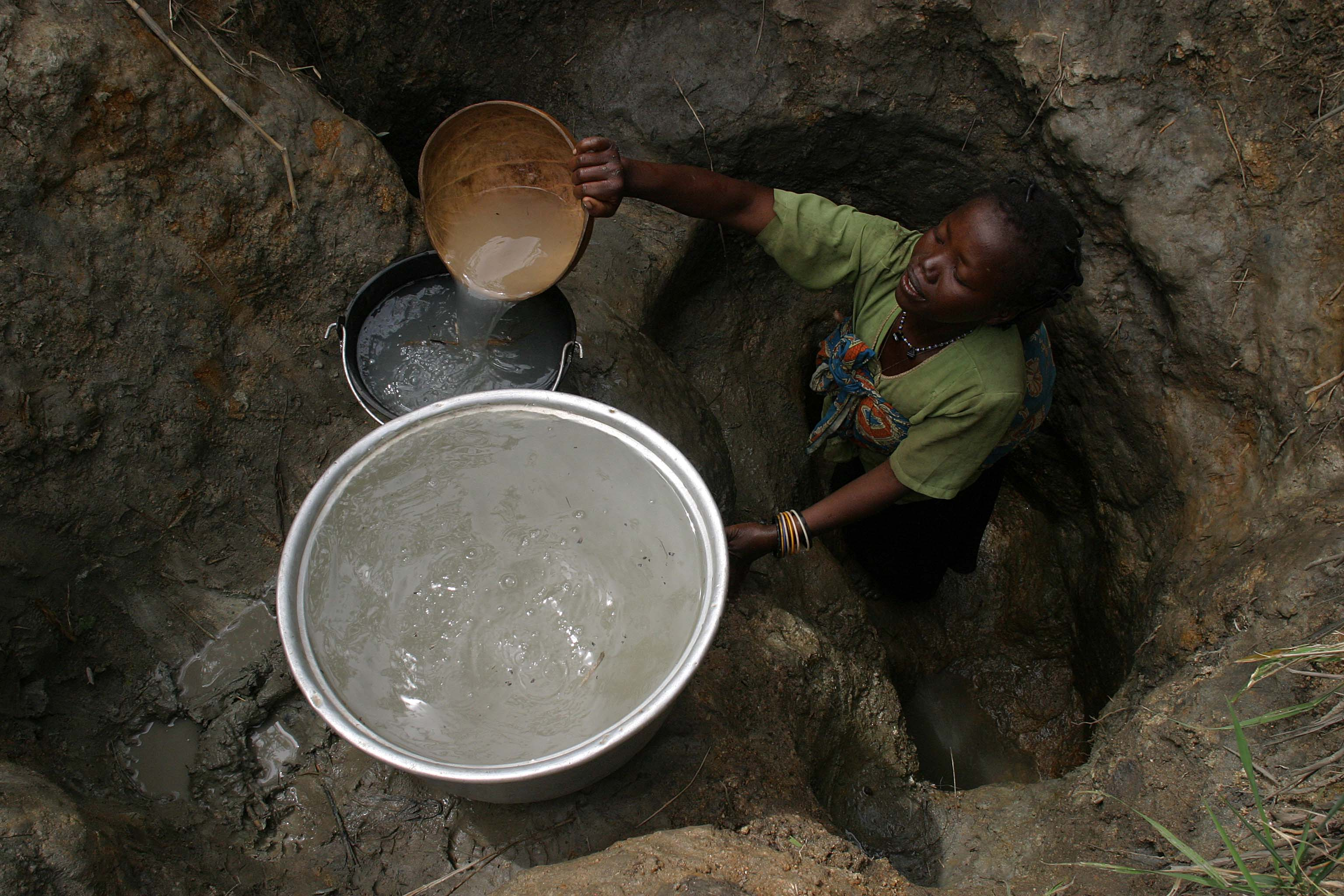
Woman taking water from a well

Rural women are particularly disadvantaged, both as poor and as women. Women in both rural and urban areas face a higher risk of poverty and more limited economic opportunities than their male counterparts. The number of rural women living in extreme poverty rose by about 50 percent over the past twenty years. Women in rural poverty live under the same harsh conditions as their male counterparts, but experience additional cultural and policy biases which undervalue their work in both the informal, and if accessible, formal labor markets. The 2009 World Survey states that "women play an active role in agriculture and rural livelihoods as unpaid family labour, independent farmers and wage labour, often without access to land, credit and other productive assets."

Women's contribution to the rural economy is generally underestimated, as women perform a disproportionate amount of care work that often goes unrecognized because it is not seen as economically productive. Though in some nations cultural and societal norms prevent women from working outside the home, in other countries, especially in rural communities in Africa, women work as major food producers, improving household food and income security. Families in extreme poverty are even more dependent on women's work both inside and outside the home, resulting in longer days and harder work for women The feminization of poverty is a concept that is applicable in both urban and rural settings.

== Policies to combat rural poverty ==
=== Land reform ===
Access to land can alleviate rural poverty by providing households a productive and relatively reliable way to make an income. The rural poor often have less access to land, which contributes to their poverty. The rural poor's access to land can be improved by redistributing land from large farms above a certain size, government legislation that challenges some traditional land systems that keep land concentrated in the hands of a few, and settlement schemes which involves providing poor rural families parcels of newly developed or government owned land. Achieving legislative reform and implementing redistributive policies, however, is a difficult task in many countries because land ownership is a sensitive cultural and political issue. Yet in China, for example, land redistribution policies have found some success and are associated with a reduction in rural poverty and increased agricultural growth.

==== Women and land reform ====
The development of legal measures to improve women's access to land is linked with achieving greater gender parity. This requires women to have the legal right to own land, as well as designating women as individual or joint owners of land parcels redistributed during reform. It also involves allowing women to have separate tenancy rights and granting women the right to claim an equal share of family land and resources upon divorce, abandonment, widowhood, and for inheritance purposes. A lack of access to land and property is linked to poverty, migration, violence, and HIV/AIDS. Increasing a woman's access to land not only benefits herself, but also benefits her family and community both in terms of increased productivity and improved welfare for her children. Beyond just legislative reform, for laws to actually guarantee women the right to land and equal inheritance, they need to be enforced; in numerous countries, despite women achieving equal land rights, long-standing social and cultural norms continue to bias policy implementation.

==== Case study: Bangladesh ====
Improved infrastructure in Bangladesh increased agricultural production by 32 percent through its effect on prices and access to inputs and technology. Improving roads and transportation systems also resulted in a 33 percent increase in the household income of the poor through the ability to diversify production, as well as an increase in savings and investment and better access to financial credit. Moreover, because of increased mobility among rural households, a rise in access to social services was noted, as well as an increase in overall health.

=== Access to mobility ===
Mobility services, such as public transport and local transportation, such as bicycles, can greatly increase the economic mobility of people in rural communities, and increase access to other poverty-reduction services such as education and healthcare.

==== Bicycle poverty reduction ====
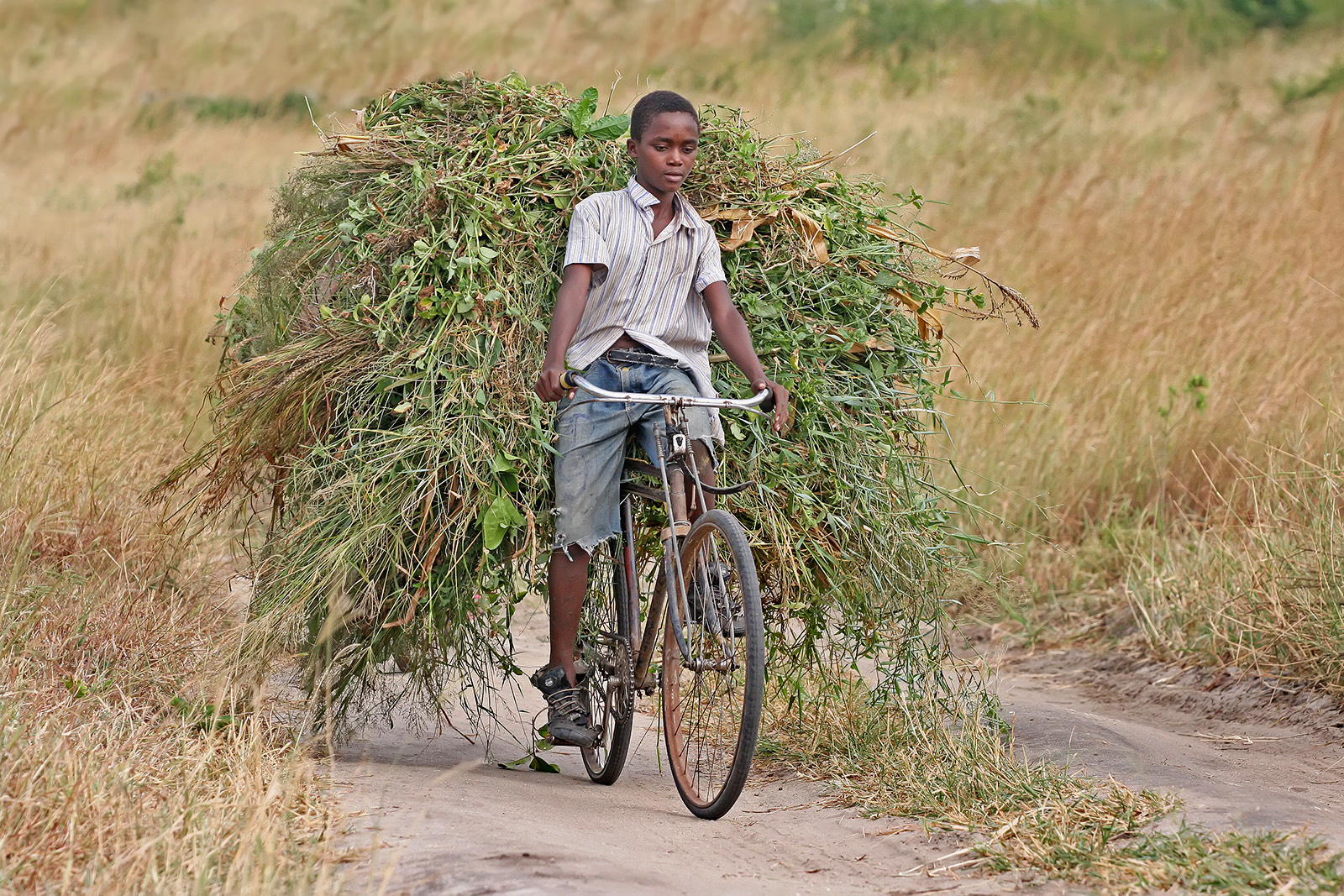
Tanzanian boy transporting fodder on his bicycle to feed his family cattle

Bicycle poverty reduction is the concept that access to bicycles and the transportation infrastructure to support them can dramatically reduce poverty. This has been demonstrated in various pilot projects in South Asia and Africa. Experiments done in Africa (Uganda and Tanzania) and Sri Lanka on hundreds of households have shown that a bicycle can increase the income of a poor family by as much as 35%.

Transport, if analyzed for the cost–benefit analysis for rural poverty alleviation, has given one of the best returns in this regard. For example, road investments in India were a staggering 3–10 times more effective than almost all other investments and subsidies in rural economy in the decade of the 1990s. A road can ease transport on a macro level, while bicycle access supports it at the micro level. In that sense, the bicycle can be one of the most effective means to eradicate poverty in poor nations.

=== Technology ===
The development of appropriate technology can raise a farm's productivity. Successful technological developments that aid the rural poor are achieved through bottom-up policies that involve technological innovations that require few external inputs and little monetary investment. The most effective innovations are based on the active participation of small farmers, who are involved in both defining the problems and implementing and evaluating solutions. Smallholder technological developments have focused on processes such as nutrient recycling, integrated pest management, integration of crop agriculture and livestock, use of inland and marine water sources, soil conservation, and use of genetic engineering and biotechnology to reduce fertilizer requirements.

==== Electrification ====
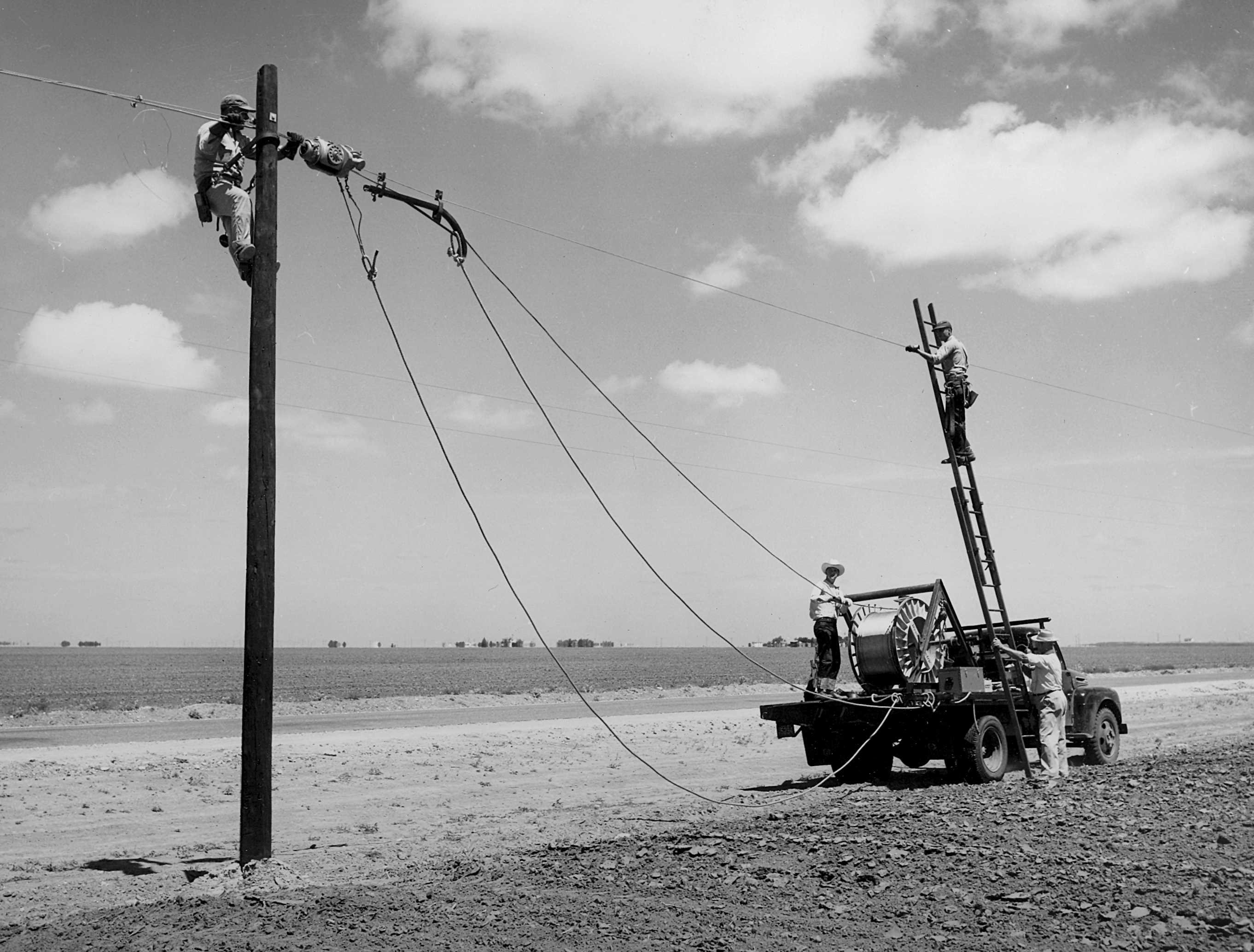
Construction of rural power distribution lines in the United States, funded by the Rural Electrification Administration

Share of the population with access to electricity

Rural electrification is the process of bringing electrical power to rural and remote areas. Rural communities are suffering from colossal market failures as the national grids fall short of their demand for electricity. As of 2019, 770 million people live without access to electricity – 10.2% of the global population. Electrification typically begins in cities and towns and gradually extends to rural areas, however, this process often runs into obstacles in developing nations. Expanding the national grid is expensive and countries consistently lack the capital to grow their current infrastructure. Additionally, amortizing capital costs to reduce the unit cost of each hook-up is harder to do in lightly populated areas (yielding higher per capita share of the expense). If countries are able to overcome these obstacles and reach nationwide electrification, rural communities will be able to reap considerable amounts of economic and social development.

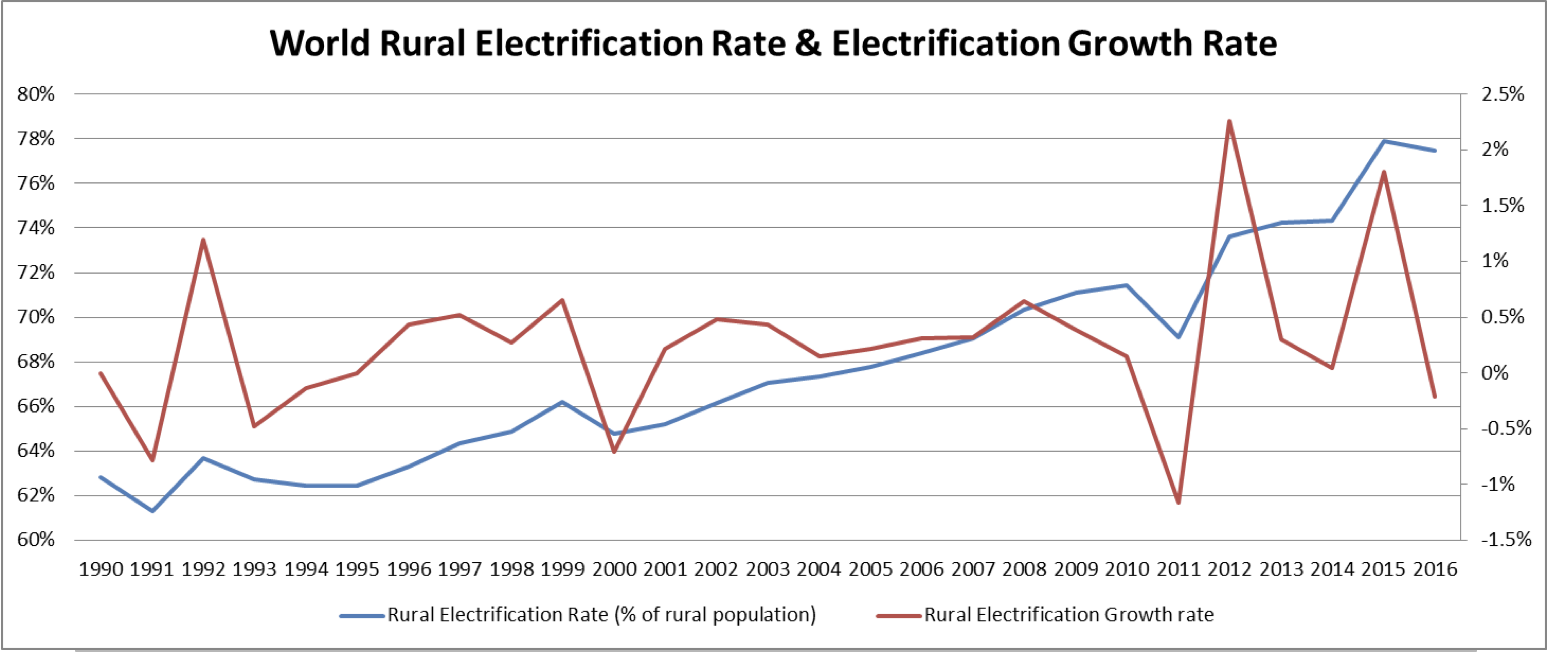
This graph shows the world rural electrification rate along with the electrification growth rate 1990–2016 and synthesizes data from the World Bank.

=== Access to credit ===
Providing access to credit and financial services provides an entry point to improve rural productivity as well as stimulating small-scale trading and manufacturing. With credit, rural farmers are able to purchase capital that increases their productivity and income. Increased credit helps expand markets to rural areas, thus promoting rural development. The ability to acquire credit also combats systems of bonded or exploitative labor by encouraging self-employment. Credit policy is most effective when provided in conjunction with other services such as technology and marketing training.

=== Diversification ===
Agricultural diversification can provide rural families with higher income and greater food security. Diversification, or a reallocation of some of a farm's productive resources, reduces farming risk, especially risk related to unpredictable or extreme weather that may be due to climate change. Policies related to diversification have also focused on crop rotation to increase productivity, as well as improving the production of traditional food crops such as cassava, cowpeas, plantains, and bananas rather than promoting the growth of more precarious cash crops. These crops tend to be at the core of farming systems among the rural poor and are generally more drought resistant and can survive under poor soil conditions. Improving the productivity and marketing of these crops promotes food and income security among rural households.

=== Universal basic income ===
Universal basic income, or UBI, has been suggested as a way to relieve rural poverty. Some studies have supported Unconditional Cash Transfers, or UCT, a type of UBI, as a way to alleviate the negative externalities associated with poverty such as food insecurity. Particularly, one study conducted in Kenya from 2011 to 2013, which studied the effects of UCT on a subset of 1500 households in Nyanza Province, found that UCT is an effective method concluding "Results demonstrated that the program had significant welfare-improving impacts, both economically and psychologically, for transfer recipients."

=== Inclusive rural transformation ===
As agricultural systems go through a process of shifting from mainly subsistence farming to commercial, highly diversified production systems, there can also be a rural transformation – the emergence of livelihood and income-generating opportunities in the rural non-farm sector. Rural transformation is inclusive when it leads to prosperity and the eradication of hunger and poverty, thereby benefiting the entire rural society. Strong links between rural areas and neighboring small cities and towns can amplify economic growth opportunities.

== See also ==
- Agrifood systems
- Capability approach
- Economic inequality
- Empowerment
- Feminization of poverty
- Food security
- Gender equality
- Human rights
- Millennium Development Goals
- Poverty
- Subsistence agriculture
- Sustainable Development Goals
- Rural development
- Water scarcity in Africa
- Work Intensity
