= World Bicycle Relief =

International non-profit focused on bicycle distribution to aid poverty relief

- Founded: 2005; 21 years ago
- Founders: F.K. Day, Leah Missbach Day
- Type: Non-profit organization
- Purpose: Bicycle poverty reduction
- Location: 1000 W Fulton Market, 4th Floor Chicago, IL 60607
- Region served: Angola, Botswana, Indonesia, Kenya, Malawi, Mozambique, Peru, Philippines, Rwanda, South Africa, South Sudan, Sri Lanka, Tanzania, Uganda, Zambia, Zimbabwe
- Website: www.worldbicyclerelief.org

World Bicycle Relief is an international, non-profit organization based in Chicago, IL that specializes in large-scale, comprehensive bicycle distribution programs to aid poverty relief in developing countries around the world. Their programs focus primarily on education, economic development, and health care. As of March 2026, World Bicycle Relief has distributed 1,000,000 bicycles in 28 countries and trained more than 4,000 bicycle mechanics in the developing world. Within their largest program, the Bicycles For Educational Empowerment program, nearly 70 percent of the student bicycles are designated for girl students.

== Background ==
Studies done in Africa (Uganda and Tanzania) and Sri Lanka on hundreds of households have shown that a bicycle can increase the income for families by as much as 35%. Transport, if analyzed for the cost-benefit analysis for rural poverty alleviation, has given one of the best returns in this regard. For example, road investments in India were a staggering 3-10 times more effective than almost all other investments and subsidies in rural economies in the 1990s. What a road does at a macro level to increase transport, the bicycle supports at the micro level. The bicycle, in that sense, can be one of the best means to eradicate poverty in developing nations.

World Bicycle Relief was founded in 2005 by SRAM co-founder and Executive Vice President F.K. Day and documentary photographer Leah Missbach Day following the December 2004 Indian Ocean tsunami. Day and his wife, travelled to Sri Lanka to witness local relief efforts. In discussions with aid groups on the ground, they realized the potential value a bicycle distribution program could provide, and thus created World Bicycle Relief. World Bicycle Relief then partnered with World Vision and a local manufacturer to produce and distribute bicycles specially designed to fit the needs and terrain of the recipients, a format that they would later use with other projects.

World Bicycle Relief has fundraising entities in the United States, Canada, Germany, United Kingdom, Switzerland and Australia.

== Key features ==
=== Specially-designed bicycles ===
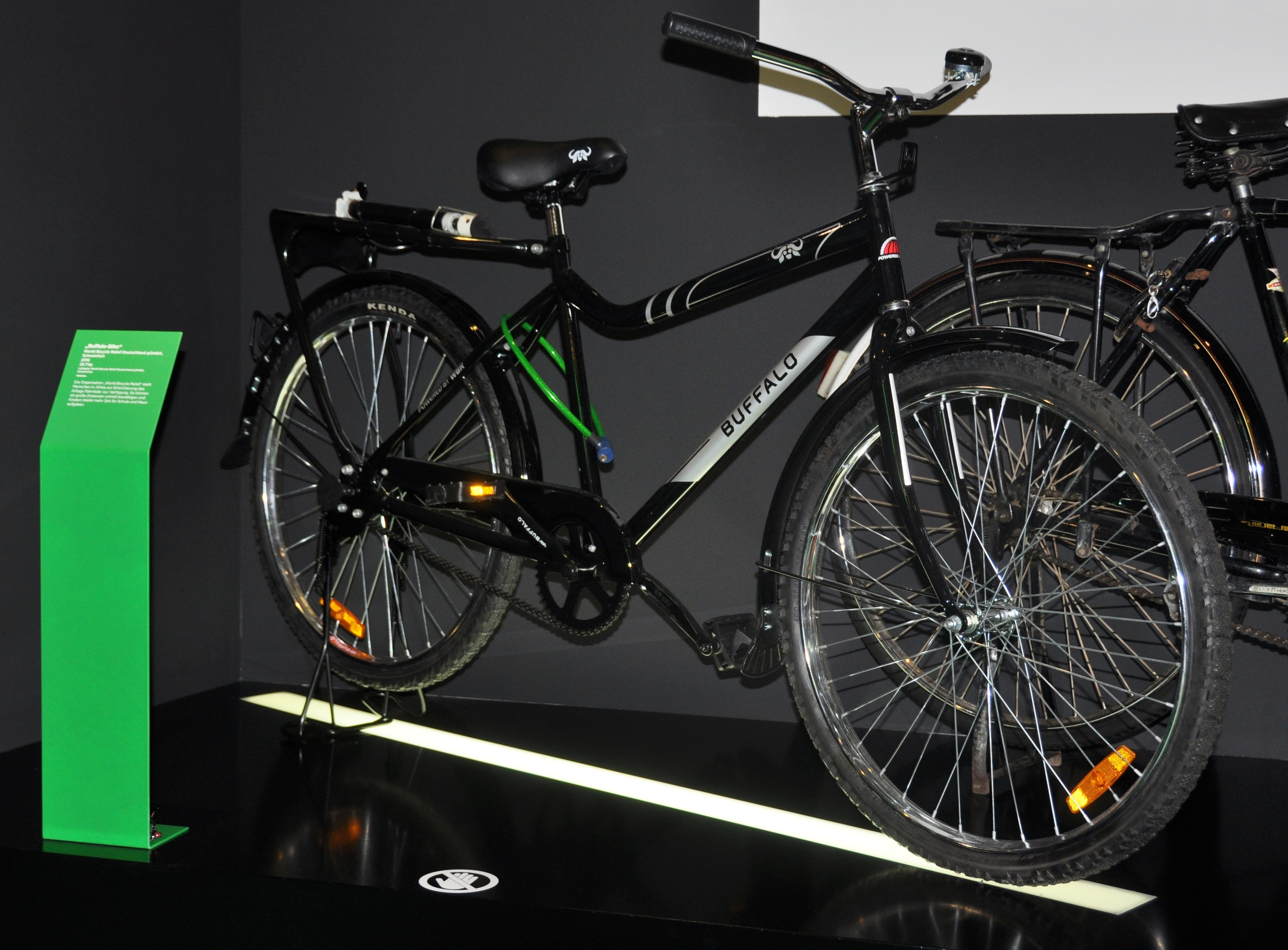
Buffalo Bicycle.

World Bicycle Relief designs bicycles specific to the environment in which they will be distributed. The WBR bicycle is branded as the Buffalo Bicycle given its strength and durability. The WBR Buffalo has a coaster brake for safety and durability, and weighs 50 pounds (23 kg), including a rear rack and fenders. It can carry a cargo of 100 kilograms (220 lb). The frame and fork are built from over-sized, 16-gauge steel, and the wheels have 32 and 40 13-gauge spokes, front and rear respectively, with 18-gauge steel rims. The bicycles are assembled in three WBR facilities in Africa—one in Harare, Zimbabwe, one in Lusaka, Zambia, and one in Kisumu, Kenya—to lower costs, be close to the end-user, and to ensure local parts compatibility.

=== Mechanic training ===
To ensure the long-term maintenance of its bicycles, World Bicycle Relief implements a bicycle mechanic training program across the communities it serves. Trainings are typically conducted in groups of 5 to 20 participants and cover bicycle maintenance, business fundamentals, and life skills. Mechanics are also equipped with professional-quality tools and uniforms to support their work. As of March 2026, World Bicycle Relief has trained and equipped 4,395 mechanics to maintain bicycles in their communities across sub-Saharan Africa. The organization also supports interested mechanics in establishing sustainable businesses by providing access to spare parts, helping strengthen the rural bicycle service network and improve long-term access to reliable transportation.

== Projects ==
=== Disaster Relief ===
In partnership with World Vision, Trek Bicycle and local government, World Bicycle Relief provided 24,3676 bicycles in Sri Lanka to men, women and children in greatest need following the 2004 Indian Ocean tsunami. The selection process included basic economic and commercial needs, distance to work, and distance to schools. An independent report found that nearly 90% of the bike recipients used their bicycles to earn a livelihood.

World Bicycle Relief has also provided bicycles to relief organizations working in Kenya to combat the 2011 famine in the Horn of Africa.

=== Microfinance and social enterprise initiatives ===
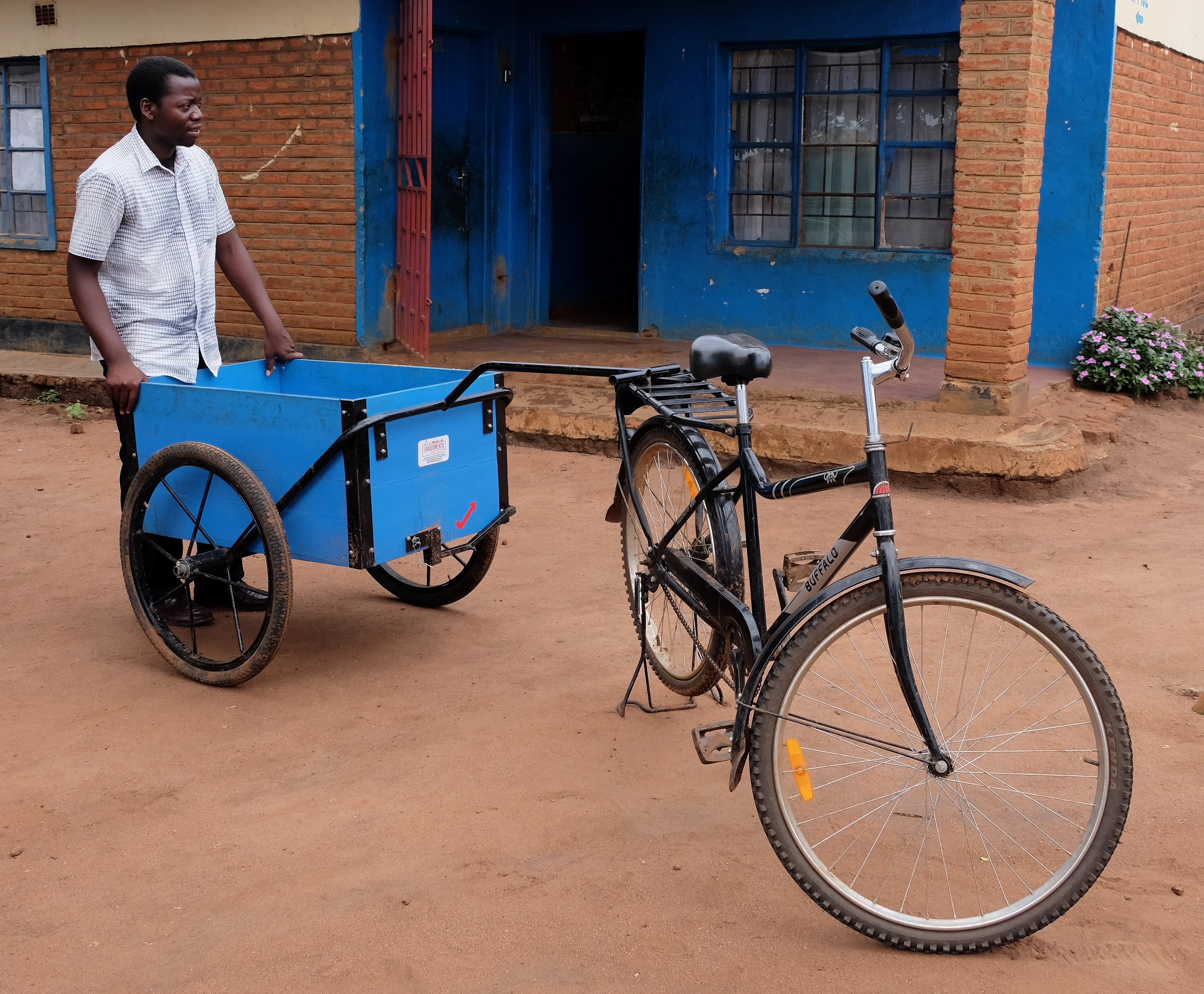
The Buffalo Bicycle, a rugged bicycle designed by World Bicycle Relief, and the Black Bull Cart, a heavy duty push cart / bicycle trailer combo that can carry up to 200kg.

World Bicycle Relief has also partnered with a variety of microfinance institutions to allow the sale of the WBR bike (The commercial version of their specially designed bike is called the "Buffalo Bike".) to individuals who cannot afford to purchase the bicycle in a one-time transaction.

One example of their microfinance work can be seen at the Magoye Milk Co-operative, a small organization of Zambian dairy farmers established by Land O'Lakes, Inc. Here, 299 farmers use Buffalo Bicycles purchased from World Bicycle Relief to transport their dairy to the central depot, where the milk is collected and transported to a dairy processing factory. The acquisition of these bicycles has allowed the farmers to increase their carrying potential while reducing the time (crucial when transporting milk) and money farmers need to spend on delivering their product each day.

Many non-governmental organizations and other aid organizations addressing various issues have relied on World Bicycle Relief's expertise in bicycle design. As a result, many organizations have bought WBR bicycles to meet their specific goals. These organizations include UNICEF (Zimbabwe), CARE (Kenya), World Vision (Mozambique), Catholic Relief Services (Zambia), Wellshare International (Uganda), and the World Food Programme (Southern Sudan).

=== Fundraising partnerships ===
To raise funds for its projects, World Bicycle Relief frequently partners with various organisations, biking events and athletes. In the past, World Bicycle Relief has partnered with UCI World Championships, Trek Bicycle, Tour of Britain, Giant Group, Jonas Deichmann, Raleigh Bicycle Company and others.

== See also ==
- Baisikeli Ugunduzi
- Bikes Not Bombs
- Bikes to Rwanda
- BikeTown Africa
- Cardboard bicycle
- Pedaling to Freedom
- With My Own Two Wheels
- Pedals for Progress
