= Baisikeli Ugunduzi =

For-profit social business specializing in bicycle components for sub-Saharan Africa

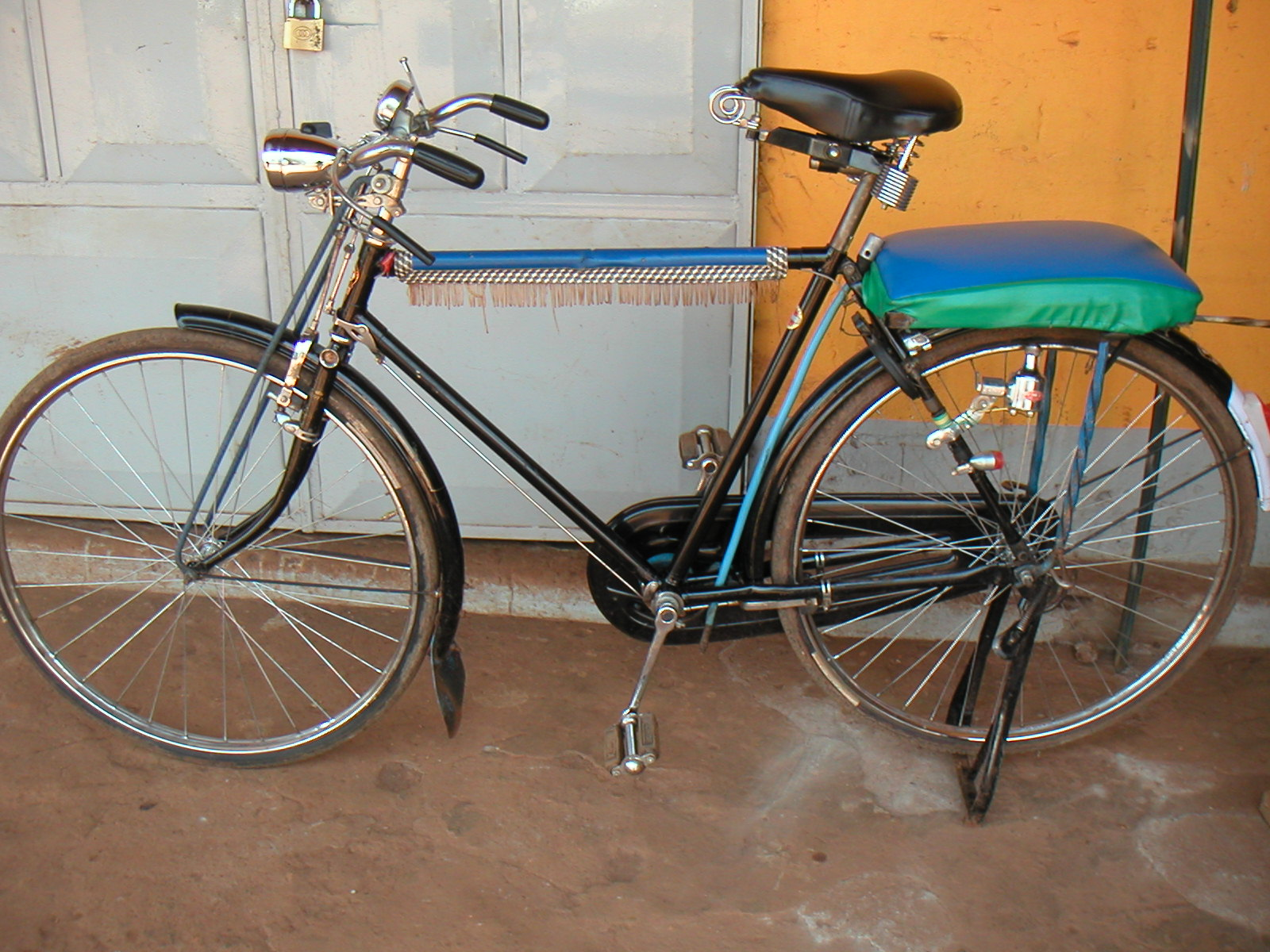
Bicycle Boda Boda in Masindi, Uganda (2009)

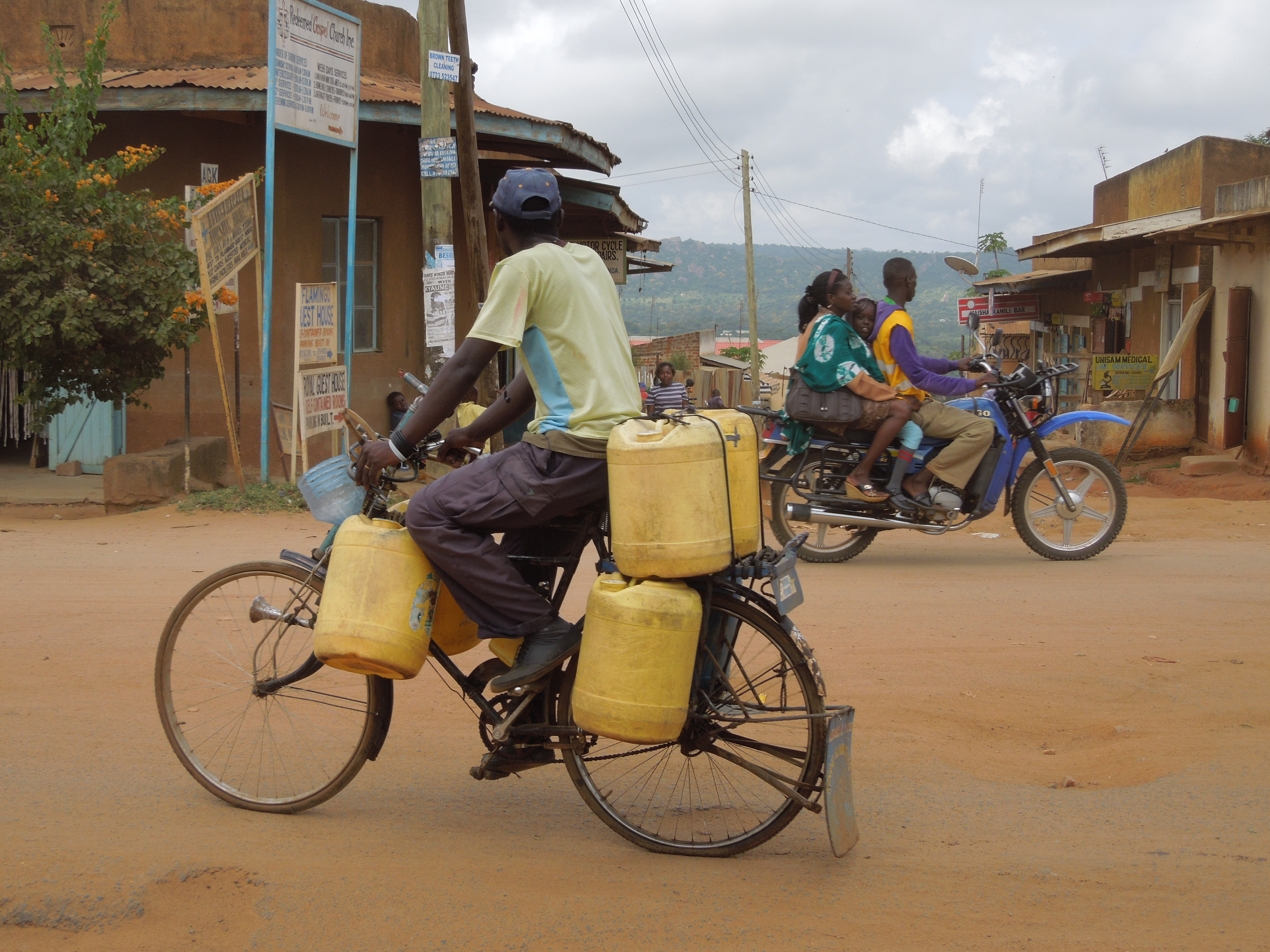
Working bicycle in Mwingi, Kenya (2013)

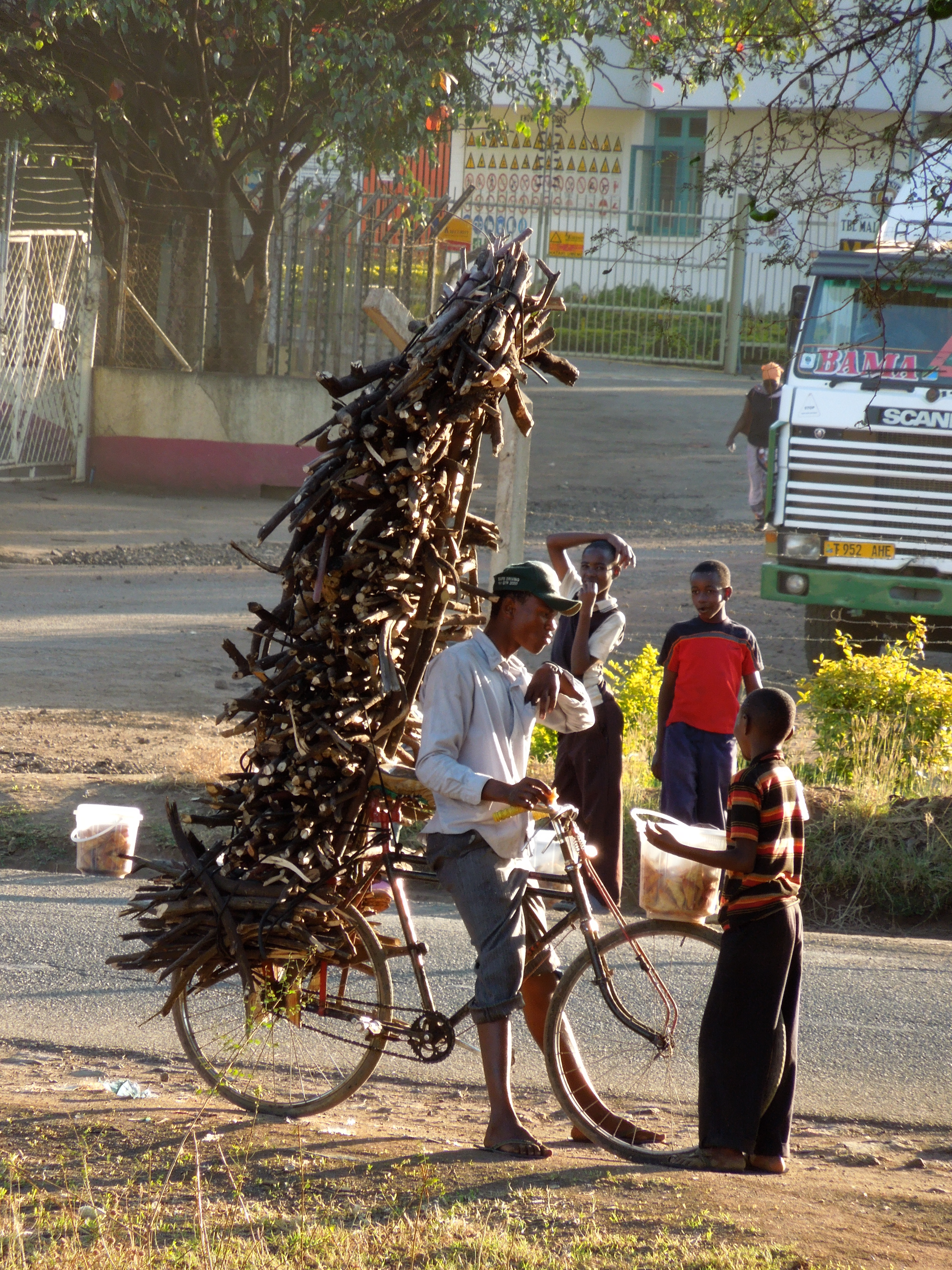
Working bicycle in Moshi, Tanzania (2013)

Baisikeli Ugunduzi is a for-profit social business that specializes in bicycle components for the Sub-Saharan African market. Baisikeli Ugunduzi means innovative or modern bicycles in Swahili. It was founded in the winter of 2011 by Ben Mitchell, whom holds a MS in mechanical engineering as is currently seeking his PhD at Michigan Technological University and John Gershenson, a professor of mechanical engineering at MTU. Baisikeli Ugunduzi is headquartered in Kitale, Kenya, Africa. As a for-profit social venture, it develops human-centered products, which seeks to raise the income of boda boda, who rely on the bicycle as a means of livelihood.

== Funding ==
Baisikeli Ugunduzi was awarded $100,000 in Development Innovation Ventures (DIV) stage 1 funding from USAID. The enterprise won first place in the Central Michigan University New Venture Competition, worth $30,000, plus an additional $10,000 for Best Social Venture, was awarded "Top 40 Project 2012" in the Dell Social Innovation Challenge, and was a semi-finalist for an Echoing Green Fellowship. A campaign to raise $40,000 in 40 days on Indiegogo, however, was unsuccessful. In April 2014, Baisikeli Ugunduzi placed third in the Global Social Venture Challenge where they were awarded $7,500.

== Product ==
Their first product is a bicycle tire inner tube replacement made of an elastic material, called the Milele Tube, which cannot go flat. Milele means forever in Swahili. It is a solid, cylindrical piece of elastic material that replaces the standard inner tube and can be cut to length to fit any size tire. It is being made with three different firmness levels. There is a soft tube for the front tire, which carries less of the total load; a medium tube for light loads on the rear; and a firm tube for heavy loads such as passengers or cargo. One test rider used the firm tube to carry 200 kg (440 lb) for 100 km (62 mi). They approximate a pneumatic tube at 65 psi (4.5 bar). The first day of sales was April 6, 2013.

== Market ==
More than 5 million people in Sub-Saharan Africa depend on bicycles to earn a living, such as boda boda operators, and they can spend up to a quarter of their incomes just to fix flat tires. Traditional bicycle tubes cost $3, and the Milele tube cost just over $10, but can last up to five years.

== See also ==
- Bikes Not Bombs
- Bikes to Rwanda
- Cardboard bicycle
- Pedaling to Freedom
- With My Own Two Wheels
- World Bicycle Relief
