= Bikes Not Bombs =

US-based non-profit organization

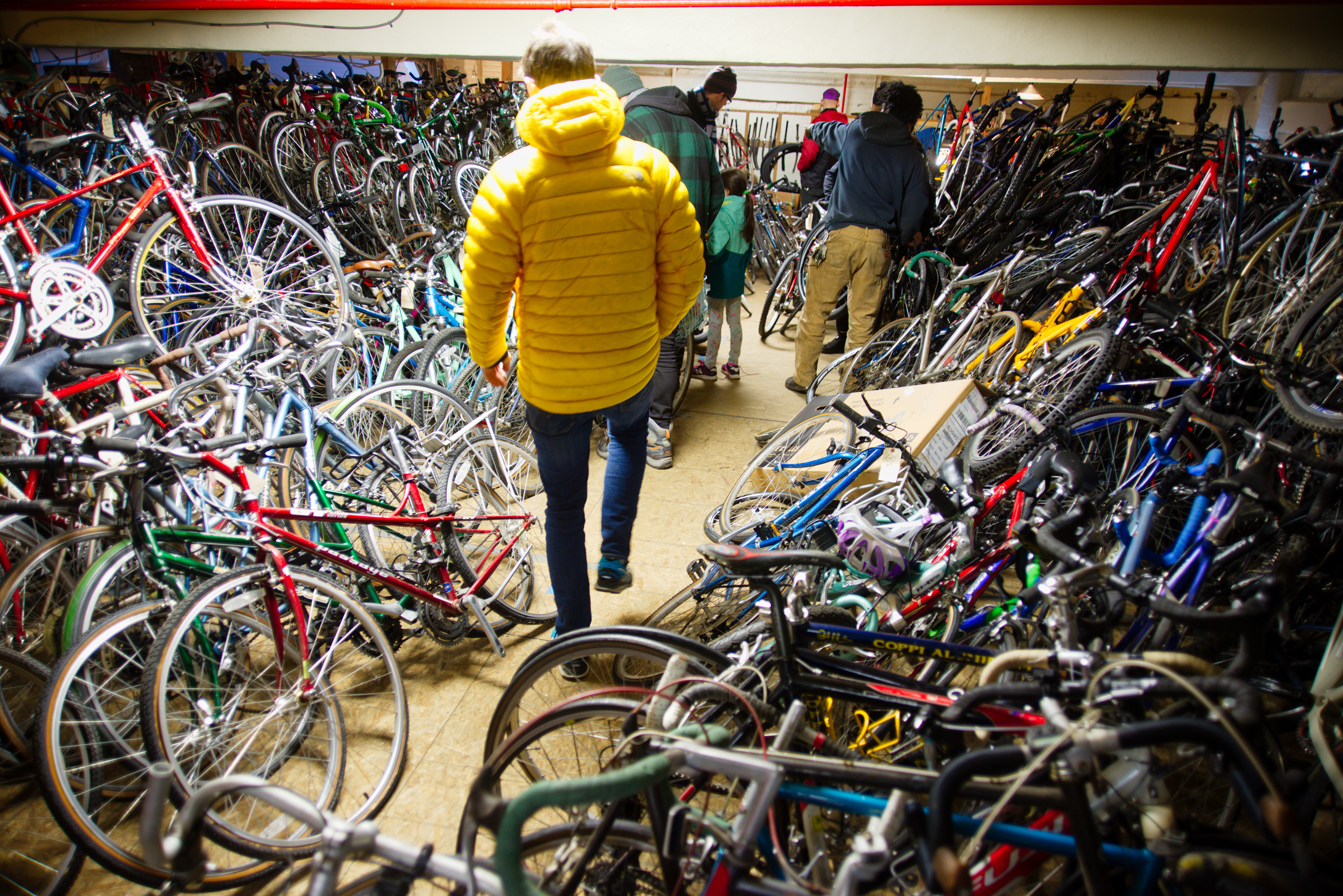
Bikes Not Bombs warehouse sale

Bikes Not Bombs is a Boston, Massachusetts based nonprofit that uses the bicycle as a vehicle for social change by recycling donated bicycles, training young people to fix their own bikes and become employable mechanics and sending thousands of bicycles to international partner communities in countries such as Uganda, Ghana, Saint Kitts and Nevis, El Salvador, Sierra Leone, Guatemala, Kenya, and Rwanda. The organization was founded in 1984 by Carl Kurz, a bicycle mechanic and Michael Replogle, a Maryland-based transportation planner. Bikes Not Bombs provided bicycles and bicycle parts to Nicaragua in opposition to the Reagan administration's support for the Contra War, and in solidarity with the Nicaraguan people and in resistance to the U.S. trade embargo against Nicaragua in effect at the time. Mira Brown became involved with BNB's work while in Nicaragua and later became the organization's first Executive Director.

Since that time, Bikes Not Bombs has sent over 70,000 bicycles and parts to 15 countries in Central America, Africa and the Caribbean. Both bicycles and bicycle parts are also sent abroad to support organizations that build pedal-powered machinery (bicitecnologia) for indigenous peoples, including grain mills, concrete vibrators, and machines for pumping water and depulping coffee that use no electricity.

The organization runs multiple sessions of the Earn-A-Bike and Girls In Action, amongst other youth programs, each year which teach bicycle mechanics, safety and riding to young people in the Boston area. Each June they host a large Bike-A-Thon in Jamaica Plain.

Bikes Not Bombs also has a Bike Shop which performs repairs and sells new & refurbished bicycles, parts, and accessories. The bike shop has been recently moved in with the headquarters, the "Hub", in the historic Sam Adams brewery complex.

== See also ==
- Baisikeli Ugunduzi
- Bikes to Rwanda
- Pedaling to Freedom
- With My Own Two Wheels
- World Bicycle Relief
- Pedals for Progress
- Food Not Bombs – Group of independent collectives serving free food
