= Bikes to Rwanda =

Non-profit international aid relief organization

Bikes to Rwanda was a non-profit international aid relief organization established in Portland, Oregon, United States, in 2006 by Stumptown Coffee Roasters founder and CEO Duane Sorenson following a business trip to visit coffee growers' cooperatives in Rwanda.

The organization's mission was "to provide cargo bicycles to co-operative coffee farmers in Rwanda. The goal was to improve quality of life in these communities through a bike workshop and maintenance program to provide transportation resources for basic needs and enhance production of quality coffee."

The bicycles were built specifically for heavy cargo, and were designed and developed by Project Rwanda with master bicycle builder Tom Ritchey. The organization also established bike shops in Rwanda for maintenance and repair.

The aim of Project Rwanda was to develop racing cyclists and also import low-cost cargo bicycles to Rwanda.

In April 2007, 400 bikes that were designed to carry heavy loads of coffee over difficult Rwandan terrain were provided ahead of the harvest.

== See also ==
- Baisikeli Ugunduzi
- Bikes Not Bombs
- World Bicycle Relief
