= Rodale =

Rodale may refer to:

- J. I. Rodale (1898–1971), publisher, sustainable agriculture and organic farming advocate
- Maria Rodale (born 1962), daughter of Robert Rodale, CEO and Chairman of Rodale, Inc.
- Rodale, Inc., a publishing company founded by J. I. Rodale
- Rodale Organic Gardening Experimental Farm, an organic farm founded by J. I. Rodale
- Robert Rodale (1930–1990), son of J. I. Rodale, and head of Rodale, Inc.
- The Rodale Institute, an agricultural research institute founded by J. I. Rodale
- Rodale, a character in the horror comic book mini-series Karney
