= BikeTown Africa =

American charity that donates bicycles to Africa

BikeTown Africa (BTA) is a charity founded in 2006 by two cyclist friends, David B. and Steve M. Between 2006 and 2012, BikeTown Africa delivered more than 2,000 new, custom-made bicycles to healthcare workers in Sub-Saharan Africa. The charity has operated largely as a partnership between Bicycling Magazine, the Rodale Institute, Bristol Myers Squibb, UTi, and Kona Bicycle Company. In 2013, BTA incorporated as a stand-alone 501(c)3 organization in the United States. Each year, BTA donates bicycles (and tools) to healthcare workers in Africa, particularly those involved in HIV/AIDS-related work. BTA volunteers travel to Africa to assemble and give away bicycles to recipient organizations (typically established, qualified HIV clinics, hospitals, or NGOs). BTA then documents the impact these bicycles have on the personal and professional lives of the recipients. Besides healthcare workers, BikeTown Africa has also donated bicycles to orphans and farmers as well as working in other countries outside of Africa, notably Afghanistan. The organization also includes training for mechanics in the areas the bicycles are distributed, as well as providing tools to equip the trained mechanics.

== History ==
The project started in 2006 with 200 bicycles donated to HIV/AIDS healthcare workers in Gaborone and Bobanang, Botswana.

In 2007, BTS expanded. 150 bicycles were distributed in Katima Mulilo, Namibia, and 169 in Tambacounda, Senegal. That same year, BikeTown Africa changed some of its policies, insisting that the bicycles must be owned by individual recipients rather than the organization, so as to promote personal responsibility for the maintenance and repair of the bikes. In return, each recipient must agree to volunteer with the organization for a fixed amount of time or devote an agreed amount of time to help sustain the project. Recipients in Lesotho earned their bicycles through attending races, cleaning up rubbish in the city, and good attendance at school.

1,000 AfricaBikes were donated in 2008. These bicycles were distributed in South Africa, Swaziland, and Mozambique. In 2009, 750 bicycles were distributed. During September 2009, an international team of volunteers assembled 268 bicycles in the Orange Farm township of Gauteng, South Africa. These were donated to the Catholic Healthcare Association of South Africa for distribution to their affiliates in South Africa, Botswana, and Swaziland. The final two projects for 2009 happened in Kibaha and Bukoba, Tanzania.

In March 2010, 100 Specialized Fuse BMX bikes were distributed to four tracks built by AMA Rider for children in townships around Cape Town. In August 2010, 120 Kona AfricaBikes were distributed in Malawi at the Baylor Tingathe Community Outreach Program. A further 120 bicycles were donated to Foundation Rwanda. In September 2010, 250 bikes were distributed in The Gambia, with assistance from the HopeFirst Foundation.

In 2011, BikeTown Africa was approached by AMA Rider to assist with its children's mountain biking league. BTA volunteers traveled to Lesotho to work with the Lesotho Cycling Association in building a cyclocross track and providing 33 mountain bicycles for all schoolchildren to use for a season of four races. The track was built on the Lesotho Olympic Training grounds in Maseru. After the series of races during the season, all 33 bicycles were handed over to the children who performed best on and off the track.

In 2012 BTA traveled to Mwanza, Tanzania to assemble and give away 100 bicycles to HIV healthcare workers at the Baylor Pediatric AIDS Hospital there.

== Bicycles ==
The primary bicycle used in BikeTown Africa is called the Kona AfricaBike. It was designed by Kona Bicycle Company to fit the unique needs of healthcare workers in Africa. Over the project's lifespan, the bicycle has undergone various changes and additions. BikeTown Africa also has distributed bicycles manufactured by Specialized.

== Current status ==
As of July 2013, the last status update on the Facebook page is a year old. The Kona website still lists the AfricaBike 3 for sale, but links to the project are all no longer active. A search of the current Rodale, Inc. and The Rodale Institute websites returns 'There are no results for "AfricaBike".' The last mention of BikeTown Africa in Bicycling magazine is in 2009. The last tweet was on 28 October 2010. On 4 January 2011, Maria Rodale, then CEO and Chairman of Rodale, Inc., published an article about BikeTown Africa in The Huffington Post.

== See also ==
- Baisikeli Ugunduzi
- Bikes Not Bombs
- Bikes to Rwanda
- Pedaling to Freedom
- With My Own Two Wheels
- World Bicycle Relief
