= Ruth Rodale Spira =

American businesswoman and author (1928–2019)

- Rodale's engagement portrait from a 1954 newspaper
- Born: Ruth Rodale; December 9, 1928; New York City, New York, U.S.
- Died: August 31, 2019 (aged 90); Allentown, Pennsylvania, U.S.
- Spouse: Joel Spira
- Parent: J. I. Rodale
- Relatives: Robert Rodale (brother); Maria Rodale (niece)

Ruth Rodale Spira (December 9, 1928 – August 31, 2019) was an American businesswoman and cookbook author.

== Early life and education ==
Ruth Rodale was the daughter of J. I. Rodale and Anna Andrews Rodale. Her parents founded Rodale Press, a global publisher of books and magazines based in Emmaus, Pennsylvania.

She earned a bachelor's degree in botany at Wellesley College in Wellesley, Massachusetts. Her brother was Robert Rodale, and her niece was Maria Rodale.

== Career ==
After college, Rodale worked at her parents' book publishing business, and edited Organic Gardening. She lived in Paris from 1952 to 1954. In 1961, she co-founded Lutron Electronics, a lighting company, with her husband, who is credited with inventing the solid-state dimmer switch. She was Lutron's co-chair, and headed the company's marketing department from 1982. In 1973, the Spiras founded another company, Subarashii Kudamono, to grow Asian pears in the Lehigh Valley. She published a cookbook, Naturally Chinese: Healthful Cooking for China (1972), considered one of the first American cookbooks to promote Chinese food primarily for its health benefits, rather than as an exotic cuisine.

Spira was an arts patron in the Lehigh Valley, serving on the board of the DeSales University Pennsylvania Shakespeare Festival, and active in the Allentown Arts Commission and the Allentown Art Museum.

== Personal life and legacy ==
Ruth Rodale married Joel Spira in 1954. They had three daughters. She was widowed when Spira died in 2015. She died in 2019, aged 90 years, in Allentown.
