= The New American Diet =

2009 book by Stephen Perrine

- Author: Stephen Perrine with Heather Hurlock
- Cover artist: George Karabotsos
- Language: English
- Subject: Nutrition
- Publisher: Rodale
- Publication date: November 2009
- Publication place: United States
- Media type: Print (Paperback)
- ISBN: 1-60529-464-0

The New American Diet (Rodale, 2009) is a diet book about the effects of "obesogens" on the human body, along with a prescriptive diet plan to reverse what the authors call "The Obesogen Effect." Author Stephen Perrine (former editorial creative director of Men's Health, and former editor-in-chief of Best Life) and co-author Heather Hurlock (former health editor of Best Life) research and discuss the link between obesogens and the American obesity crisis, as well as increases in rates of diabetes, depression, heart disease, declining birth rates and sperm counts, and autism.

Obesogens are described as natural and artificial endocrine-disrupting chemicals found in the food and water supply.
