= Prevention (magazine) =

American magazine

- Michelle Obama on the cover of the November 2009 issue of Prevention
- Editor: Jane Francisco
- Categories: Health
- Frequency: Monthly
- Format: Digest
- Total circulation: 2,143,109 (2014)
- Founder: J. I. Rodale
- Founded: 1950
- Company: Hearst Communications
- Country: US
- Based in: New York City, New York, U.S.
- Language: English
- Website: https://www.prevention.com/
- ISSN: 0032-8006

Prevention is an American healthy-lifestyle magazine published by Hearst Corporation featuring articles about health conditions, wellness, food and nutrition, weight loss, fitness, and beauty.

Founded in 1950 by J. I. Rodale and published initially by Rodale, Inc., in Emmaus, Pennsylvania, Prevention grew out of J. I. Rodale's interest in exploring the connection between human health and organic agriculture. The magazine launched with approximately 50,000 subscribers.

In 2018, Prevention was acquired by Hearst Magazines along with four other Rodale brands: Men's Health, Women's Health, Runner's World, and Bicycling. Today, Prevention is published in both the United States and Australia.

== Editor-in-chief timeline ==
- J. I. Rodale (1950–1971)
- Robert Rodale (1971–1990)
- Mark Bricklin (1991–1997)
- Anne Alexander (1997–2000)
- Elizabeth Crow (2001–2002)
- Rosemary Ellis (2003–2006)
- Liz Vaccariello (2006–2010)
- Diane Salvatore (2010–2012)
- Anne Alexander (2012–2014)
- Bruce Kelley (2014–2015)
- Barbara O'Dair (2016–2018)
- Jane Francisco (2018–present)

== See also ==
=== Competitors ===
- Reader's Digest
- Health
- Guideposts Magazine
- WebMD the Magazine
- Fitness (defunct)
- Shape
- Self (defunct)
- Redbook (defunct)
- Weight Watchers (defunct)
- Whole Living (defunct)
