= Matt Bean =

American journalist (born 1978)

- Born: 1978 (age 47–48); Woodstock, Illinois
- Occupation: Journalist
- Years active: 2004-present

Matt Bean (born 1978) is an American journalist. He currently serves as editor-in-chief of Sunset.

== Early life and education ==
Bean was born in 1978 in Woodstock, Illinois, to Joan Bean and Don Bean. He attended Northwood Elementary and was the school spelling bee winner for several consecutive years.

Bean graduated from the University of Chicago in 2000 with a B.S. in Neurobiology and a B.A. in Psychology. He holds a M.S. in magazine writing from the Columbia University Graduate School of Journalism. Bean has lectured at New York University on mobile applications development and marketing.

== Career ==
Bean first joined Men's Health in 2004 as associate editor, after spending three years at Court TV. Between 2004 and 2012, Bean served various positions including vice president, digital product development, and article editor at Rodale, Inc., the publisher of Men's Health, Prevention and other lifestyle magazines and books. He helped develop a mobile edition for Men's Health and about 50 other mobile apps for Rodale.

From 2008 to 2012, Bean hosted Spike TV's comedy series, The Playbook. He has also appeared frequently as a guest on Good Morning America, The Today Show, Charlie Rose and others. In 2011, the American Society of Magazine Editors awarded him a prize for Top Digital Extension. In 2012, Bean moved to Sports Illustrated, where he served as managing editor of digital properties until 2014. While there, he launched a digital talk show, SI Now, and the online SI Longform and Swim Daily. Between 2014 and 2015, Bean served as editor in chief at Entertainment Weekly.

In February 2015, Bean was named senior vice president of Editorial Innovation at TIME. There, he helped establish digital brands Extra Crispy and The Drive, and oversaw development of The Foundry, TIME's Brooklyn-based content studio.

In September 2016, Bean became vice president and editor-in-chief at Men's Health. In May 2017 he overhauled the magazine's design and editorial direction to include visual streamlining and new sections. Under Bean, Men's Health released several new franchises including online video series, MH Films, the social media studio MH Rec Room, and the online cross-platform series The Adventurist in partnership with Fitbit. In 2017, Bean was selected as one of the Folio: 100 honorees for his work in the magazine media industry. During his tenure, Men's Health was named Editor's Choice and Reader's Choice in Adweek Hot List for the men's health/fitness magazine category, and was also a Print Medal Finalist for the Society of Publication Designers' 52nd Annual Design Competition Awards. Bean left Men's Health after it was acquired by Hearst.

In November 2018, Bean became the editor of Sunset.
