= Australian Art Review =

- Editor: Patricia Anderson
- Categories: Fine arts
- Frequency: Quarterly
- Publisher: Australian Art and Leisure Media
- First issue: March–June 2003
- Final issue: July 2013
- Country: Australia
- Based in: Sydney
- Language: English
- ISSN: 1447-8587

Australian Art Review was a quarterly magazine and website based in Sydney, featuring a mixture of exhibition reviews, artist and gallery profiles, advice for collectors and articles by art critics and scholars. It was published between 2003 and 2013,

== History ==
The first edition of the Australian Art Review appeared in March/June 2003. The founding company was Media Publishing, based in Clontarf, New South Wales. The magazine has its headquarters in Sydney. In 2008, the magazine was purchased by Westwick-Farrow Media, and remained part of the company until August 2011. From number 29 that was published in September-October 2011 the magazine became part of the Australian Art and Leisure Media.

Australian Art Review was started as a quarterly publication, and later it was published three times per year for a short period time. The frequency was later switched quarterly.

The journal ceased publication in July 2013
