= Gay Times =

LGBTQ+ media brand

- Cover of the December 2021 issue, featuring Bimini Bon-Boulash
- Categories: LGBTQ+
- Frequency: Online
- Format: Digital and social
- Founded: 1984
- Company: Gay Times Ltd
- Country: United Kingdom
- Based in: London, England
- Language: English
- Website: www.gaytimes.com
- ISSN: 0950-6101

Gay Times (stylized in all caps), also known as Gay Times Magazine and as GT, is a UK-based LGBTQ+ magazine established in 1984. Originally a magazine for gay and bisexual men, the company began including content for LGBTQ+ communities across a number of outlets, including a monthly digital magazine, a website updated daily with news and culture content, and a number of social-media platforms.

== Publication, content, and impact ==
Gay Times is published digitally each month in the United Kingdom and distributed globally, and includes interviews, fashion, news, features, music, film, style and travel. Gay Times also features an online site as well as social promotion channels under the brand name.

The magazine is published by GAY TIMES Ltd. The CEO of GAY TIMES Ltd. is Tag Warner, who was appointed in January 2019. The magazine ceased print publication in September 2021 and releases a digital issue each month via the Gay Times app, Apple News+, Readly and other digital publication providers. The current editorial director of Gay Times is Megan Wallace, who was appointed in August 2023. Former editorial director, Lewis Corner, was appointed Senior Vice President, Global Content in the same month.

Amplify by Gay Times is a monthly digital cover story which focuses on emerging talent and community conversations. It was created in January 2019.

In September 2021, Gay Times became the first LGBTQ+ publication to pass a million followers on Instagram.

ELEVATE by Gay Times and Apple Music is a collaboration between the companies with the aim to support and platform emerging LGBTQ+ music talent. Previous ELEVATE artists include Arlo Parks, Rina Sawayama, Victoria Monét and Hope Tala.

In 2024, Gay Times announced an official partnership with Uncloseted Media, a U.S. LGBTQ media company, to bring "rigorous, queer-focussed journalism to [their] readers."

== Gay Times Honours ==
The organisation hosts Gay Times Honours, an annual awards show celebrating figures in and beyond the LGBTQ+ community for their contributions.

Previous winners include the cast of Heartstopper, Bella Ramsey, Jonathan Bailey, Edward Enninful, Sir Ian McKellen, Pabllo Vittar, Honey Dijon, Kylie Minogue, Tom Daley and akt.

Gay Times Honours also features live performances by international stars. Previous performers include RAYE, Tove Lo, Rina Sawayama and Cat Burns. Gay Times Honours first began in 2017.

== Awards ==
In 2022, Gay Times won 'Brand of the Year (Consumer Media)' at The Drum Online Media Awards 2022. In the same year, Gay Times won 'Brand of the Year (Consumer Media)' and 'Editorial Team of the Year (Consumer Media)' at the British Media Awards 2022. Tag Warner was listed on the Forbes '30 Under 30' list in 2022 in his role as CEO of GAY TIMES.

Gay Times won the Cover of the Year at the PPA Awards 2022 for its cover story featuring Little Mix star Jade Thirlwall.

Lewis Corner was named Editor of the Year (Consumer Media) at the PPA Awards 2023. Gay Times won 'Editorial Team of the Year (Consumer Media)' at The Drum Online Media Awards 2023. Hollie Wong received a PPA Next Gen Award 2023 in their role as Head of Social at Gay Times.

== See also ==
- List of LGBT periodicals
- List of men's magazines
