= MH-18 (magazine) =

US teen magazine

- Cover of the premier issue MH-18 (U.S.), Oct/Nov 2000.
- Editor: Jeff Csatari
- Categories: Health lifestyle
- Frequency: Bi-Monthly
- Publisher: Rodale, Inc.
- Founded: 2000
- First issue: August 2000
- Final issue: 12 November 2001
- Country: United States
- Based in: Emmaus, Pennsylvania, United States
- Language: English
- Website: mh-18.com

MH-18, published by Rodale, Inc. in Emmaus, Pennsylvania, was a magazine covering teen lifestyle. The magazine was started as a quarterly publication in August 2000. A youth-oriented version of Men's Health magazine, it was targeted at 13- to 18-year-old males. The last issue was published on 12 November 2001.
