= Verve (Indian magazine) =

Indian magazine

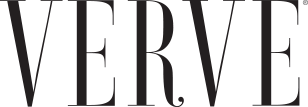

- Radhika Apte on the cover
- Editorial director: Aalika Mahindra
- Categories: Lifestyle, fashion
- Frequency: Web only
- Format: Digital
- Publisher: Anuradha Mahindra
- Founded: 1995; 31 years ago
- Company: Indian and Eastern Engineer Ltd.
- Country: India
- Based in: Mumbai
- Language: English
- Website: www.vervemagazine.in
- OCLC: 37128882

Verve is one of India's premier and home-grown, English-language digital luxury and lifestyle magazines for women.

The magazine has announced that they are not accepting new subscriptions for the print edition and will release a set of subscription packages for the "new normal". Magzter lists the April–May 2020 edition of the magazine as its last print edition. Verve continues to publish new articles on their website.

== History and profile ==
Verve was launched in 1995. Anuradha Mahindra, wife of industrialist Anand Mahindra, is the founder, editor and publisher of Verve. She also launched its sister publication, later called The Indian Quarterly (IQ), which is a literary journal. The South-Mumbai–based publishing organisation also produces specialised in-house magazines, coffee-table books, and supplements for leading brands. Verve has not been owned or run by any foreign company. About 80 per cent of its readership is in cities.

== Focus ==
The luxury magazine-turned-website focuses on women's lifestyle, including trends, national and international fashion, arts and culture, beauty, travel, food and spaces. Verve is known for its strong people focus, with in-depth interviews of famous people, Bollywood stories and a platform for the discovery of new talent.

Verve used to have an annual Power Issue (curated list of the power women of the year in June), an annual Best Dressed Issue (curated list of the best dressed women of the year in October) and a January fresh list which had a curated list of young achievers. Verve had an art-themed issue in July and bridal issue in September too. Verve celebrates its anniversary every December.

== Print cycle ==
Verve started out as a quarterly publication in 1995. It then became a bi-monthly (coming out every 2 months) in 2005 and finally made the change over to a monthly in 2007 to keep pace with growing readership demands. The last Verve issue during the global coronavirus pandemic was the digital Environment Issue in June 2020. Prior to that, the Food Issue was released in March 2020, the Ambition Issue in January 2020, the Celebrate You Issue in November 2019, the Entertainment Issue in August 2019 and the Design Issue in June 2019. Its most recent issue was the digital Cinema Issue in January 2021.

== Verve Man ==
Verve had an annual "Verve Man" supplement that started in 2009 and became a bi-annual property in 2014. Celebrities to have made it to the cover of Verve Man included Kunal Kapoor, Imran Khan, Abhay Deol, John Abraham, Shah Rukh Khan, late Sushant Singh Rajput, and Ranbir Kapoor.

== Team ==
- Anuradha Mahindra (Editor and Publisher)
- Aalika Mahindra (Editorial Director)
- Divya Mahindra (Creative Director)
- Shraddha Jahagirdar-Saxena (Executive Editor)
- Shirin Mehta (Fashion, Features & Lifestyle Editor)
- Minal Shetty (Art Director)
- Arti Sarin (PR & Corporate Communications Director)
- Puneet Dhawan (Regional Manager – North)
- Mala Vaishnav (Editorial Consultant)
