= T-Town =

T-Town may refer to:

== United States ==
- T-Town Velodrome, the Lehigh Valley Velodrome, Pennsylvania
- Tinicum Township, Delaware County, Pennsylvania
- Tampa, Florida
- Tacoma, Washington
- Tallahassee, Florida
- Teutopolis, Illinois
- Texarkana, Texas
- Texarkana, Arkansas
- Tierrasanta, a community in San Diego, California
- Tinsel town, a nickname for Hollywood, Los Angeles, California
- Toledo, Ohio
- Trenton, New Jersey
- Tucson, Arizona
- Tullahoma, Tennessee
- Tulsa, Oklahoma
- Tupelo, Mississippi
- Turlock, California
- Tuscaloosa, Alabama
- Tooele, Utah
- Torrance, California
- Thomaston, Georgia
- Tucker, Georgia
- Tazewell, Tennessee
- Torrington, Connecticut

== Canada ==
- Toronto, Ontario
- Truro, Nova Scotia

== México ==
- Torreón, Coahuila

== Norway ==
- Tønsberg
- Trondheim
- Tromsø
- Tananger
