= Bicycling (magazine) =

American cycling magazine

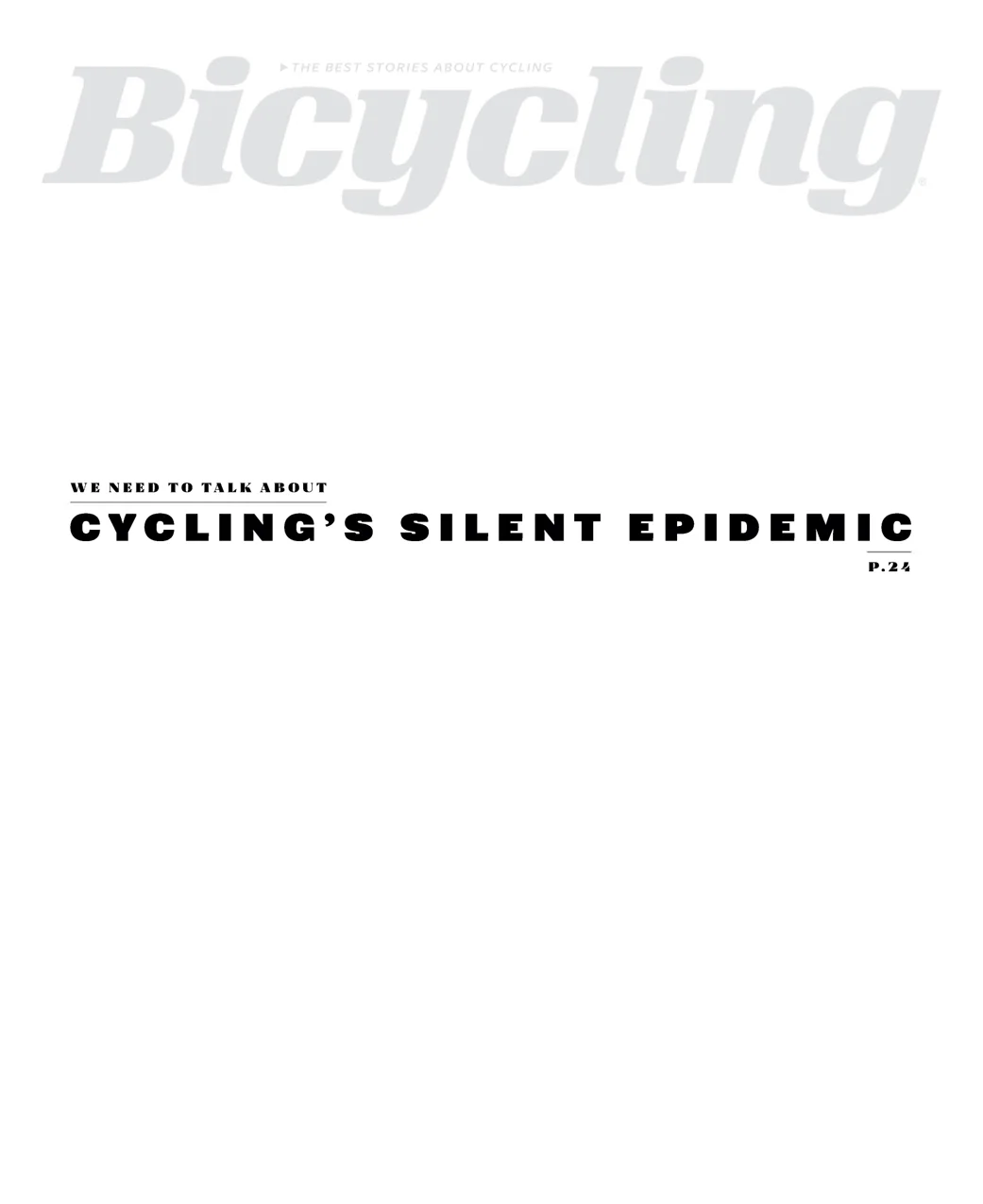
- Cover of the Spring 2024 issue
- Editor-in-Chief: Bill Strickland
- Frequency: 10 issues annually
- Total circulation: 325,000 (2015)
- First issue: 1961
- Company: Hearst Magazines
- Country: United States
- Based in: Easton, Pennsylvania
- Language: English
- Website: bicycling.com
- ISSN: 0006-2073

Bicycling is a cycling magazine published by Hearst in Easton, Pennsylvania.

== History ==
Bicycling started in 1961 as Northern California Cycling Association Newsletter, a four-page mimeographed newsletter (8 ½ x 14) started by Peter Hoffman. It covered the local bicycle scene and grew quickly as Vol. 1 No. 6 took on a 5 ½ x8 ½ offset printing format in December, 1961. The name was changed to American Cycling Newsletter with Vol. 3 No. 1 in March, 1964 issue. The name was changed again with Vol. 5 No. 1 in March, 1965 to American Cycling. The size was changed to a larger format with Vol. 5 No. 1 in March, 1966 to 8 ½ x 11. Peter Hoffman sold the magazine to Leete Publications in August 1968 but stayed on as an editor until late 1969. The last American Cycling titled magazine was the Nov. 1968 issue, Vol. 7 No. 8. The name was changed to Bicycling! with the Dec 1968 Issue Vol 7 No 9. For three months following the name change, "American Cycling" was included on the cover in small print under the Bicycling! masthead. NCCA Newsletter and American Cycling were published ten times a year, March though December; however, in 1968 -the first year under Leete- there were only nine issues. Leete skipped the October issue and called it November both to make it more current, and because they were behind in production as they worked on the design change to Bicycling!. After 1968 the magazine went to publishing twelve issues a year. Pricing of the magazine changed over the years as follows July 62 to December 64, 25 cents, March 65 to June 67, 35 cents, July 67 to July 68, 45 cents, In August 1968 with the Leete purchase the price went up to 50 cents, and the covers were changed to full color; the previous covers had been in red and black.

In April 1973, the magazine was acquired by Capital Management Publications. In early December 1977, Rodale, Inc. in Emmaus, Pennsylvania sent a team to California to arrange to buy Bicycling!. Rodale acquired Bicycling! from Capital Management Publications and published their first issue in February, 1978. In 1980, Rodale purchased a smaller magazine, Bike World, and merged it into Bicycling!. In 1982 Rodale bought American Cyclist and incorporated it into Bicycling. Under Rodale's ownership, the magazine also published a number of books about bicycles and bicycling.

Hearst announced its acquisition of Rodale in 2017. Hearst moved Bicycling to Easton, Pennsylvania in 2018.

== Projects and compilations ==
BikeTown Africa is a project that started in 2006 as a partnership between Bicycling, Rodale, Inc., Bristol Myers Squibb, and Kona Bicycle Company. The project donates bicycles to healthcare workers in Africa, particularly those involved in HIV/AIDS related work. Bicycling then documents the impact these bicycles have on the personal and professional lives of the recipients, such as in the May 2010 issue, where Dr. Travis (of the daytime television talk show The Doctors) is interviewed about his involvement in BikeTown (among other things). In the same issue, Bicycling compiled a list of the 50 most bike-friendly cities in the United States, with Minneapolis, Minnesota as number one.

== Book publishing ==
- David H Bryan, T L Gettings, Bicycling and photography, 1979, ISBN 978-0-87857-282-3
- David Lynn Smith, Eugene A Gaston, Get fit with bicycling, 1979, ISBN 978-0-87857-283-0
- Basic riding techniques, 1979, ISBN 978-0-87857-284-7
- Richard Jow, Reconditioning the bicycle, 1979, ISBN 978-0-87857-285-4
- Basic bicycle repair, 1980, ISBN 978-0-87857-315-8
- Marcia Holoman, John Schubert, et al., The Most frequently asked questions about bicycling, 1980, ISBN 978-0-87857-300-4
- Best bicycle tours, 1980, OCLC 381821071
- Bicycling's best tours, 1980, OCLC 7175346
- Norman Sheil, Pat Griffith, Grand Prix training manual II, 1982/1984, OCLC 41806979
- The bicycling users' magazine, 1982, OCLC 11347893
- Bicycle Repair, 1985
- Easy Bicycle Maintenance, 1985
- Complete Guide to Bicycle Maintenance and Repair, 1986
- Susan Weaver, Ride like a pro, 1988, ISBN 978-0-87857-754-5
- Cycling for Women, 1989
- New Bike Owner's Guide, 1990
- Long-Distance Cycling, 1993
