= Women's Health (magazine) =

Lifestyle magazine

- Cover of the May 2009 issue featuring Zoe Saldaña
- Editor: Liz Plosser
- Categories: women's health
- Frequency: 4 issues per year
- Publisher: Hearst Magazine Media
- Total circulation: 1,589,342 (2011)
- Founded: 2005
- Country: United States
- Based in: New York City, New York, U.S.
- Language: English
- Website: www.womenshealthmag.com
- ISSN: 0884-7355
- OCLC: 1102801076

Women's Health (WH), published by Hearst, is a lifestyle magazine centered on the health, sex, nutrition, and fitness of women. It is published 10 times per year in the United States and has a circulation of 1.5 million readers. The magazine has 13 international editions, circulates in over 25 countries, and reaches over 8 million readers globally. Before its acquisition by Hearst, it was initially founded by Rodale, Inc. in Emmaus, Pennsylvania.

The magazine features multiple sections, such as fitness, sex and love, food, weight loss, health, beauty, and style. Past Women’s Health cover models include Elisha Cuthbert, Ashley Greene, Anna Kournikova, Michelle Monaghan, Zoe Saldaña and Elizabeth Banks.

== History ==
Rodale created Women's Health in 2005 as a sister publication of Men's Health magazine. Bill Stump, a former Men’s Health editor, who was at the time the head of Rodale Inc.’s New Product Development department, led the launch. The magazine's founding editor-in-chief was Kristina Johnson, previously the original executive editor of Teen People. In 2008, David Zinczenko, editor-in-chief of Men's Health magazine, was named editorial director of Women's Health. In March 2009, Jack Essig, SVP/Publisher of Men's Health, was named SVP/Publisher of Women's Health.

Women's Health is published in the United States, Argentina, Australia, Brazil, China, Germany, Indonesia, Malaysia, New Zealand, Philippines, Thailand, and Turkey. The German edition of the magazine was launched in April 2011. A South African version was launched alongside its own Men's Health magazine, for which Media24 issued a license for publication with distribution by Magzter.

Hearst acquired Rodale in 2018.

Bauer Media Australia and New Zealand published Women's Health's Australian edition. In July 2020, the Sydney investment firm Mercury Capital acquired Bauer Media's operations in Australia and New Zealand. This paused the magazine's production in the region due to "declining advertising revenue and travel restrictions caused by the COVID-19 pandemic."

The Polish edition launched in 2013 and ceased publication in 2023.

== DVDs and books ==
Women's Health has also produced DVDs marketed for weight loss, toning, and physical conditioning. The DVDs include Look Better Naked, Ultimate Abs Workout, The Tone-up Workout, The Wedding Workout, and Train for Your Body Type.

The DVDs also have accompanying health and fitness books. Titles include: The Women's Health Diet, The Big Book of Exercises, The Big Book of Abs, Look Better Naked, and Six Weeks to Skinny Jeans.

== Awards and recognition ==
In 2012, Women's Health was ranked #4 on Adweek Media's "Hot List" and #2 on Advertising Age's annual "A-List" for their performance in advertising and circulation. In March 2008, Women’s Health finished #1 on Adweek's "10 under 50" Hot List. The magazine was named #2 on Advertising Age's 2008 A List. In 2009, the magazine was named "Magazine of the Year" by Advertising Age. In 2011, Women's Health won a National Magazine Award for "General Excellence". The brand was named one of Ad Age's "Magazines of the Year" in both 2017 and 2018, and was nominated for a National Magazine Award for "magazine section" in 2016 and for "personal service" in 2017.

== Editors-in-chief ==
The founding editor-in-chief, Kristina Johnson, guided Women's Health from its inception in 2003 until her departure in 2008. In January 2009, Michele Promaulayko took over the editorial responsibility. She was succeeded in 2014 by Amy Keller Laird, the magazine's Executive Editor. On January 9, 2018, Hearst announced that Liz Plosser would take over.
