= KABOOM! (non-profit organization) =

Playground-building non-profit organization

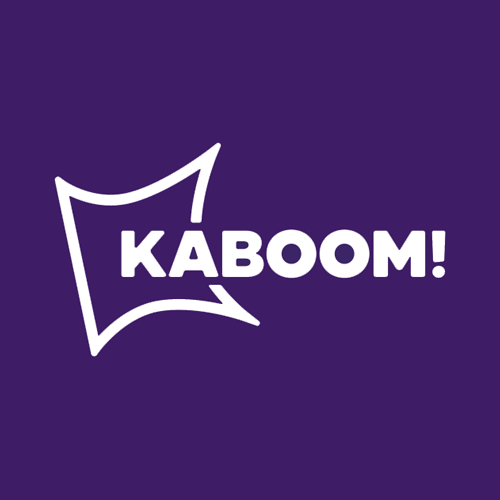
- KABOOM! logo, introduced in 2020
- Formation: 1996
- Founder: Darell Hammond
- Type: Non-profit organization
- Purpose: Charitable
- Headquarters: Washington, D.C.
- Chief Executive Officer: Lysa Ratliff
- Website: kaboom.org

KABOOM! is an American non-profit organization that helps communities build playgrounds for children.

== History ==
Darell Hammond and Dawn Hutchison founded the company KABOOM! in 1996. They were inspired to start KABOOM! after reading a story in The Washington Post about two local children who suffocated while playing in an abandoned car because they had nowhere else to play. Hammond had previously helped build several playgrounds for other charitable organizations. Hammond was also partially inspired by his upbringing in the Mooseheart Child City & School, a group home in Mooseheart, Illinois. Hammond previously studied under Dr. John Kretzmann, director of the Assets Based Community Development Institute in the Northwestern University in Evanston, Illinois. The institute, which focuses on mobilizing struggling communities using resources already at hand, served as a community-build model for KABOOM! Hammond was also influenced by his participation in the Columbus, Ohio, and Chicago engagements of City Year, an AmeriCorps program seeking to build democracy through citizen service and social entrepreneurship.

Hammond and his friend Dawn Hutchison built their first KABOOM! community playground in October 1995. The two were contacted by Youth Service America to plan a day of service. Although not yet operating under the KABOOM! name, they chose to build a playground at Livingston Manor in southeast Washington, D.C. The playground build lasted five days and involved more than 500 volunteers. Inspired by the build, Hammond and Hutchison incorporated KABOOM! in April 1996. Kimberly-Clark, the corporation behind paper-based consumer products like Kleenex, chose to serve as KABOOM!'s first funding partner as a way of celebrating their 125th anniversary. Kimberly-Clark partnered with KABOOM! to build 38 playgrounds in 1997. Hutchison left KABOOM! that year.

In 1997, KABOOM! launched the "Let Us Play" campaign, which sought to build, renovate or provide assistance to develop 1,000 community-built playgrounds by the year 2000. Vice President Al Gore and General Colin Powell helped launch the program. By 1999, KABOOM! had 50 funding partners and was building more than 50 playgrounds a year.

KABOOM! launched Operation Playground in December 2005, an initiative to build 100 playgrounds in the Gulf Coast areas affected by Hurricane Katrina and Hurricane Rita.

In 2003, KABOOM! began building skateparks under the Eskal8 name. However, this program was discontinued in 2009 when the equipment manufacturer contracted by the organization discontinued the line of products that KABOOM! volunteers could use. In 2004, KABOOM! started offering toolkits, training packages and other forms technical assistance to communities seeking to build playgrounds without the charity's direct oversight. Darell Hammond also made the charity's project handbooks, best practices and guidelines available for free on the organization's website.

In 2007, the organization formed the KABOOM! National Campaign for Play, a program focused specifically on rallying individuals and governments to the KABOOM! cause.

== Partnerships with national business ==
The Home Depot has been a long-standing partner of KABOOM! projects. When KABOOM! became incorporated in 1996, The Home Depot became KABOOM!'s founding partner, and has been building playgrounds with KABOOM! every year since. The Home Depot Foundation has supported KABOOM!'s "1,000 Playgrounds in 1,000 Days" initiative,

In 2005, KABOOM! and The Home Depot formed a $25 million partnership for the "1,000 playgrounds in 1,000 days" program. The two groups also build sports fields and ice rink projects, as well as playgrounds. In January 2006, First Lady Laura Bush attended Operation Playground's first playground build at the Hancock North Central Elementary School in Kiln, Mississippi.

In 2009, The Home Depot Foundation became the official "Sustainability Partner" of KABOOM!. The partnership was formed to minimize the environmental impact of playground builds and educate communities on environmentalism and sustainability. Together, KABOOM! and Home Depot have created procedures for environmental-friendly building titled "Guidelines for Eco-Friendly Service Projects". Organizations and community leaders can utilize the Guide when planning construction or building projects.

Pierre Omidyar, founder and chairman of the Internet auction company eBay, contributed $5 million to KABOOM! for the establishment of its website and to support the organization's National Campaign for Play, which advocates the importance and health benefits of play to legislators and policy experts. In addition to Home Depot, KABOOM! has worked in collaboration with such corporations as Target, Fannie Mae and Ben & Jerry's, which created an ice cream flavor "KaBerry KaBOOM" to benefit the organization.

KABOOM! was featured prominently in an episode of the NBC comedy series Parks and Recreation which aired October 22, 2009. The episode, called "Kaboom", included a subplot in which protagonist Leslie Knope (played by Amy Poehler) becomes so inspired by the energy of a KABOOM! playground build that she takes proactive steps to build a playground in her own home town. The episode was part of a campaign in which more than 60 television shows on multiple networks spotlighted real-life charities in an effort to encourage volunteerism.

In 2010, KABOOM! formed a partnership with Amgen, the world's largest biotechnology firm, to build 7 playgrounds across the US and Puerto Rico.

In 2014, KABOOM! became the official distributor of Rigamajig in collaboration with Heroes Will Rise and Cas Holman.

KABOOM! partners with Foresters Financial, the MetLife Foundation, Kraft Foods, Travelers Insurance, and Dr Pepper Snapple Group. Thanks to the partnership with Foresters alone, KABOOM! has built more than 140 playgrounds across the U.S. and Canada as of 2017.

KABOOM! teamed up with Marlon Jackson and his Study Peace Foundation in 2015, to build playgrounds in New Orleans, Gary and Los Angeles, offering programs designed to engage children, adults and the elderly to live in peaceful environments.

== Work with presidential administrations ==
KABOOM! volunteers have worked closely with presidential administrations to serve domestic relief and education programs. In January 2006, then First Lady Laura Bush gave dedication address for a KABOOM! playground built at the Hancock North Central Elementary School in Kiln, Mississippi. The project was commissioned after the Hurricane Katrina catastrophe that hit the Gulf Coast region of the United States.

In June 2009, KABOOM! volunteers worked with United States First Lady Michelle Obama and California First Lady Maria Shriver to build a playground in San Francisco. The playground construction was commissioned under the Obama Administration's summer "United We Serve" initiative.

In 2011, First Lady Michelle Obama inaugurated KABOOM!'s 2000th playground, in Washington, D.C to commemorate the organization's 15th anniversary.

== Methods ==
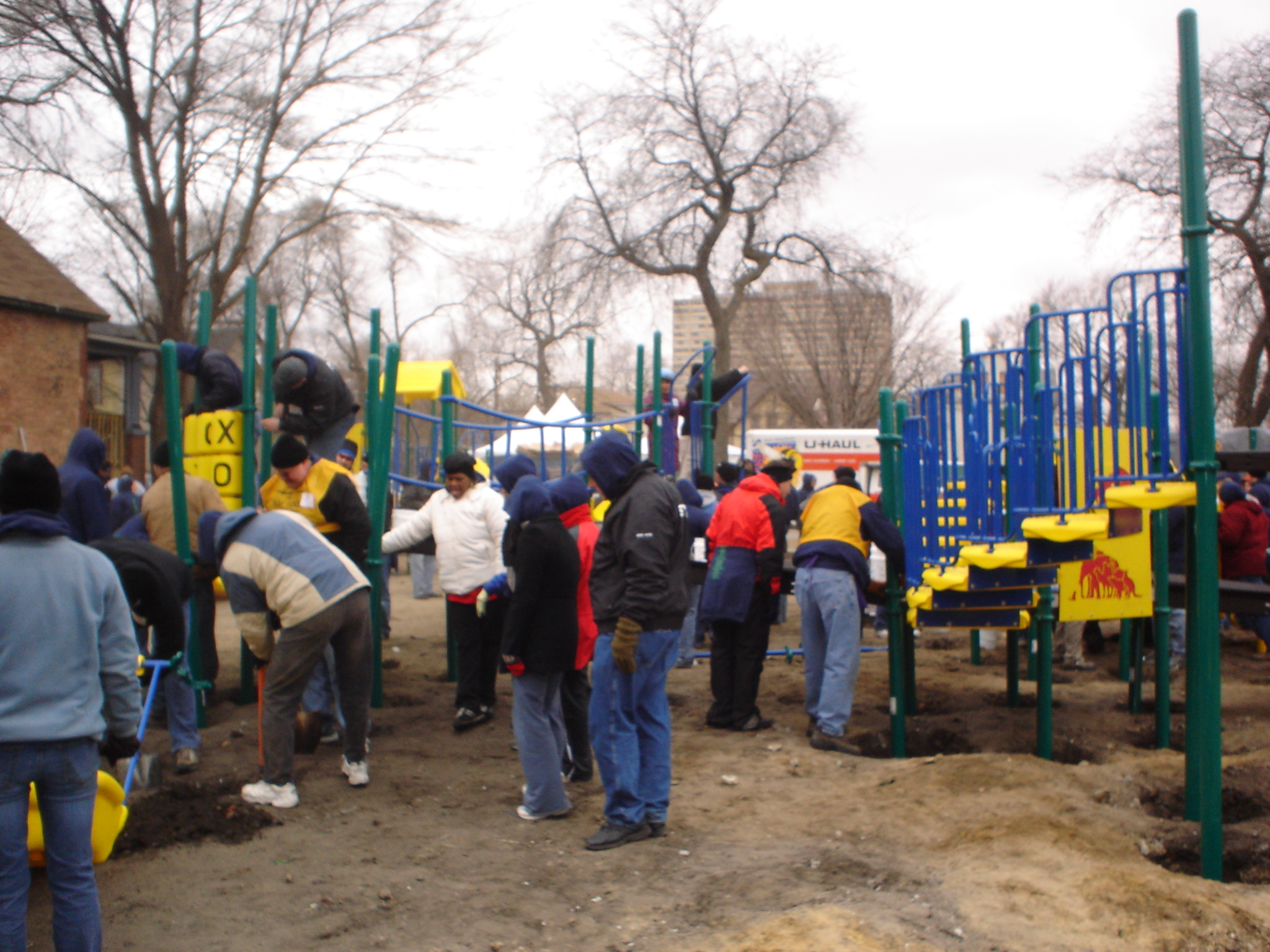
A playground build in Chicago

KABOOM! organizers build a playground set during a single day. The process begins about six months before the actual construction, when KABOOM! seeks a funding partner, searches for an appropriate site and considers the economic needs of the neighborhood. About 10 weeks before the playground build, project managers visit the community and speak to children about what types and colors of playground equipment they prefer. Three different designs are drafted and the community chooses the final one.

A typical playground ranges from between $70,000 and $125,000. KABOOM! requires its local communities to raise about 10% of the cost, which Darell Hammond described as "a way of engaging the community to solve its own challenges".

Since 2007, the charity has been creating additional online education and training online to give those interested in the cause of play access to industry thought leaders and research. The KABOOM! Map of Play offers users an online map to add, find and rate local playgrounds.

The organization follows a strict process for designing and building playgrounds. The organization also offers "Do-It-Yourself" planning tools and how-to guides for those interested in building or improving a playground.

Chrysler chairman Robert Nardelli, who previously worked with KABOOM!, called the charity "one of the best-run nonprofits".

== Programs ==
=== KABOOM! National Campaign for Play ===
The KABOOM! National Campaign for Play program, launched in 2007, is intended to encourage individuals and governments to embrace the KABOOM! cause. It has two components: the Playmaker Network and Playful City USA. The first of these provides tools and training to individuals to assist them in outreaching to their communities in creating and cleaning play spaces. It also recognizes "Playmakers of the month" for their achievements.

The Playful City USA campaign recognized communities across the country that have made a commitment to play. In 2010, 118 cities were designated Playful City USA communities, representing 36 states. The Playful City USA program ended in 2017.
