= J. I. Rodale =

Publisher and author

Jerome Irving Rodale
- Born: Jerome Irving Cohen; August 16, 1898; New York City, U.S.
- Died: June 8, 1971 (aged 72); New York City, U.S.
- Occupations: Publisher; author
- Known for: Organic gardening
- Spouse: Anna Andrews (m. 1927)
- Children: 3, including Robert and Ruth

Jerome Irving Rodale (/ˈroʊdeɪl/; né Cohen; August 16, 1898 – June 8, 1971) was a publisher, editor, and author who founded Rodale, Inc. in Emmaus, Pennsylvania, and The Rodale Institute, formerly the Soil Health Foundation.

Rodale was an early advocate of sustainable agriculture and organic farming in the United States. As an author, his work included several magazines and books, including books featuring different authors, on the subject of health. He popularized the term "organic" as a term for growing food without pesticides. Rodale also published works on other topics, including The Synonym Finder.

On June 8, 1971, Rodale died after suffering a fatal heart attack while appearing as a guest on a segment, which was never broadcast, of The Dick Cavett Show. Rodale was taken to Roosevelt Hospital and pronounced dead on arrival at age 72.

== Early life and education ==
Rodale was born in Manhattan, New York City, on August 16, 1898, the son of an Orthodox Jewish grocer who immigrated from Poland, and was raised in tenements on the Lower East Side. Due to a poor relationship with his father, whose last name was Cohen (originally Lachofsky), he changed his surname to Rodale as an ode to his mother's maiden name, Rouda.

== Career ==
He worked as an accountant for New York City from 1917 to 1920 and worked for the Internal Revenue Service from 1920 to 1921.

Rodale and his brother Joseph co-founded Rodale Manufacturing, a maker of electrical equipment, in New York City in 1923. He married Anna Andrews in 1927; she died in 2000 at 95. They had three children: Robert Rodale (1930–1990), Nina Rodale, and Ruth Rodale.

Rodale was already concerned with his health at this time, since he had heart murmurs and had been rejected from the U.S. Army in World War I for poor eyesight. To improve his health, he read the works of Bernarr Macfadden and invented an exercising device. The Rodale brothers moved Rodale Manufacturing to Emmaus, Pennsylvania, in 1930 to cut costs during the Great Depression. That same year, he founded Rodale Press, which marketed books and magazines.

Inspired by his encounter with the ideas of Albert Howard, Rodale developed an interest in promoting a healthy and active lifestyle that emphasized organically grown foods, and established the Rodale Organic Gardening Experimental Farm in 1940.

In 1942, Rodale Press started publishing Organic Farming and Gardening magazine, which promotes organic horticulture; it was later retitled Organic Gardening. In 1945, he wrote "Pay Dirt", the first American book on organic gardening. To Rodale, agriculture and health were inseparable. He felt that soil required compost and eschewed pesticides and synthetic fertilizers and that plants grown in such soil would help people stay healthier.

One of Rodale's most successful projects was Prevention magazine, founded in 1950, which promotes disease prevention rather than trying to cure it later. It pioneered the popularization of whole grains, unrefined sweets, avoiding fat in food preparation, folk cures, herbal medicines and breastfeeding. It also promoted the consumption of higher than typical amounts of nutritional supplements and forgoing nicotine and caffeine. Rodale opposed the consumption of milk and sugar, which he blamed for many diseases. He was not a vegetarian and frequently denounced vegetarianism. Rodale once stated "I'm going to live to be 100, unless I'm run down by some sugar-crazed taxi driver."

Rodale was also a playwright, operating the Cecilwood Theater in Fishkill, New York and the Off-Broadway Rodale Theater at 62 East Fourth Street in the East Village of New York City. His plays included Toinette (1961) and The Hairy Falsetto (1964).

== Views ==
Some medical experts have described Rodale as a promoter of quackery. For example, Rodale accused sugar of "causing criminals," and blamed various diseases, including bronchitis and pneumonia, on the consumption of bread. He also believed that consumers of cola drinks would become sterile.

Rodale was an anti-vaccinationist, and claimed that polio could be cured with the adoption of a healthy diet, writing that "really healthy children do not get polio." He also made dubious claims about cancer, for instance that "rimless glasses" and "saltwater" could cause cancer. In his book Happy People Rarely Get Cancer (1970), Rodale said, "Negroes get less cancer than whites, for the Negro is a happy race. True, there is their problem of segregation, but the Negro race being what it is, I think a Negro sings just the same, and is not going to let segregation dampen his spirits as much as a similar problem would do to the white person."

It was reported that Rodale took 70 food supplements daily. He was criticized for promoting unsubstantiated claims about vitamin supplements. Stephen Barrett of Quackwatch commented that Prevention magazine was filled with "nonsense promoting dietary supplements... many articles contained therapeutic claims that would be illegal on product labels."

The Oxford Encyclopedia of Food and Drink in America noted that the agricultural establishment "dismissed Rodale as a quack, crank, a gadfly, and a manure-pile worshiper."

== Death ==
On June 8, 1971, Rodale was a guest on an early-evening taping of The Dick Cavett Show in New York City. The episode was slated to air later that evening. During his interview, Rodale said that he had "never felt better in his life!", and made quips like "I'm in such good health that I fell down a long flight of stairs yesterday and I laughed all the way" and "I've decided to live to be a hundred". He had previously said, "I'm going to live to be 100, unless I'm run down by some sugar-crazed taxi driver." Rodale's last interaction with Cavett before dying was "offering the host his special asparagus boiled in urine".

After his interview, Rodale remained onstage and was seated on a couch beside the next interviewee, New York Post columnist Pete Hamill. Rodale suddenly made a "snoring sound" and slumped over. According to Dick Cavett, Hamill leaned over to Cavett and said, "This looks bad." Cavett initially believed that Rodale was feigning disinterest for comedic effect; some in the studio recalled him joking, "Are we boring you, Mr. Rodale?", though he denied any memory of saying this. Upon realizing the severity of the situation, he asked if there were any doctors in the audience. An internist and orthopedic surgeon, both in residency, rushed onto the stage and tried to revive Rodale with cardiopulmonary resuscitation.

During an appearance on The Tonight Show Starring Johnny Carson that originally aired February 5, 1982, Cavett and Carson discussed the incident. Cavett said that "firefighters from across the street" also came to Rodale's aid. Although an electrocardiogram continued to show cardiac activity, Rodale could not be revived and was pronounced dead on arrival at Roosevelt Hospital, aged 72. The episode was never broadcast, although Cavett described the story in public appearances and on his blog.

== Legacy ==
After Rodale's death, his son Robert Rodale ran the publishing firm until his own death in a car accident in Moscow in 1990. That work included editing the high-circulation Prevention magazine. Robert had competed in the Olympics in rifle shooting and was inducted into the United States Bicycling Hall of Fame in 1991.

Rodale's granddaughter Maria Rodale became chairman and CEO of Rodale, Inc. She attributes her interest in the organic food movement to growing up on America's first certified organic farm.

In October 2017, New York City media giant Hearst announced it would acquire the magazine and book businesses of the 90-year-old Rodale Inc. for an undisclosed sum.

== Books ==
- Pay Dirt: Farming & Gardening with Composts, 1945.
- The Synonym Finder, 1978. ISBN 978-0-87857-236-6
- How to Grow Vegetables and Fruits by the Organic Method, 1961. OCLC 171305
- The Word Finder, 1947. ISBN 978-0-87857-138-3 OCLC 174829
- The Encyclopedia of Organic Gardening. OCLC 5288851
- Stone Mulching in the Garden.
- Vegetables.
- The Healthy Hunzas, 1948, Rodale Press, Emmaus, PA. 255 p.
- Are We Really Living Longer?
- Arthritis, Rheumatism, and Your Aching Back.
- Cancer, Facts & Fallacies.
- Happy People Rarely Get Cancer, 1970.
- The Complete Book of Composting.
- The Hairy Falsetto: A One-Act Farcical Social Satire.
- The complete Book of Vitamins, 1966. OCLC 804785
- The natural way to better eyesight 1966.
- The Prostate 1967, Rodale Books, Inc., Emmaus, PA. D-739; Harald Taub, Designer and Editor; Sowers Printing Co., Lebanon, PA.
- Sugar: The Curse of Civilization, 1967.
- Lower your Pulse and Live Longer, 1971.
- Magnesium, the Nutrient that Could Change Your Life, 1978.

== See also ==
- Men's Health (magazine)
