= Darell Hammond =

American philanthropist

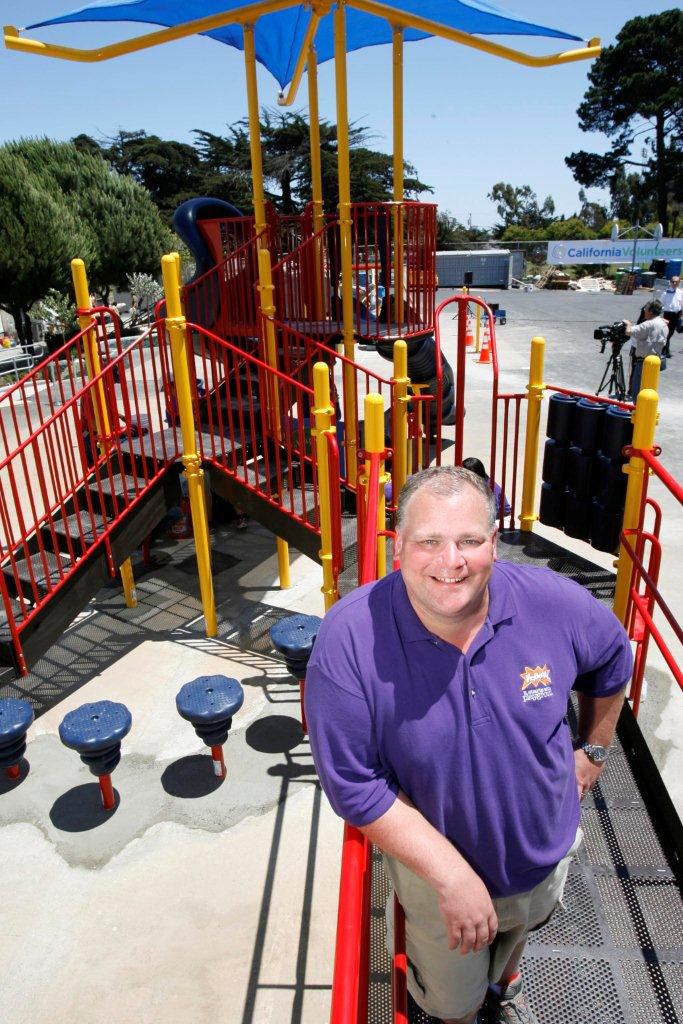

Darell Hammond is an American philanthropist, founder of the non-profit organization KaBOOM! that helps communities build playgrounds for children. Hammond also speaks at conferences and universities about his work and blogs on The Huffington Post. Hammond, who from the age of four enjoyed a happy childhood in a group home founded by Moose International, began building playgrounds in college, founding KaBOOM! with a friend in 1996. He has received multiple honors and awards for his work, including the President's Volunteer Service Award. In 2011, Hammond released his best-selling memoir, KaBOOM! How One Man Built a Movement to Save Play. He was listed in the Forbes 2011 list of the top 30 social entrepreneurs and was named as a "Health hero" by WebMD.

== Early life ==
Born in Jerome, Idaho, to a nursing home employee and a truck driver, Hammond is the seventh of eight children. Two years after Hammond's father abandoned the family, Hammond's mother had a breakdown and found herself unable to take care of the children, and they were sent as wards of the court to the Mooseheart Child City & School, a group home in Mooseheart, Illinois. During the 14 happy years he spent at the home before achieving the age of majority, he enjoyed his experiences on the group home's playground, and in his junior year at Ripon College first took part in helping to build a community playground, assisting the mother of a friend.

Hammond did not complete college, but relocated to Chicago as part of an Urban Studies Fellowship through the Associated Colleges of the Midwest. There, he studied under Dr. John Kretzmann, director of the Assets Based Community Development Institute in the Northwestern University in Evanston, Illinois. The institute, which focuses on mobilizing struggling communities using resources already at hand, would later serve as a community-build model for KaBOOM! After seeing the influence of the playground he had helped build on its community, Hammond also participated in the Columbus, Ohio, and Chicago engagements of City Year, an AmeriCorps program seeking to build democracy through citizen service and social entrepreneurship.

== KaBOOM! ==
In 1995, shortly after he had moved to Washington, D.C., Hammond read a story in The Washington Post about two local children who suffocated while playing in an abandoned car because they had nowhere else to play. This, combined with his prior experiences, inspired Hammond and his friend Dawn Hutchison to address the need for playgrounds for children. The pair were already committed to designing a day of service for Youth Service America and chose to build their first playground at Livingston Manor in southeast Washington, D.C. The project, which involved over 500 volunteers, took five days in October, 1995.

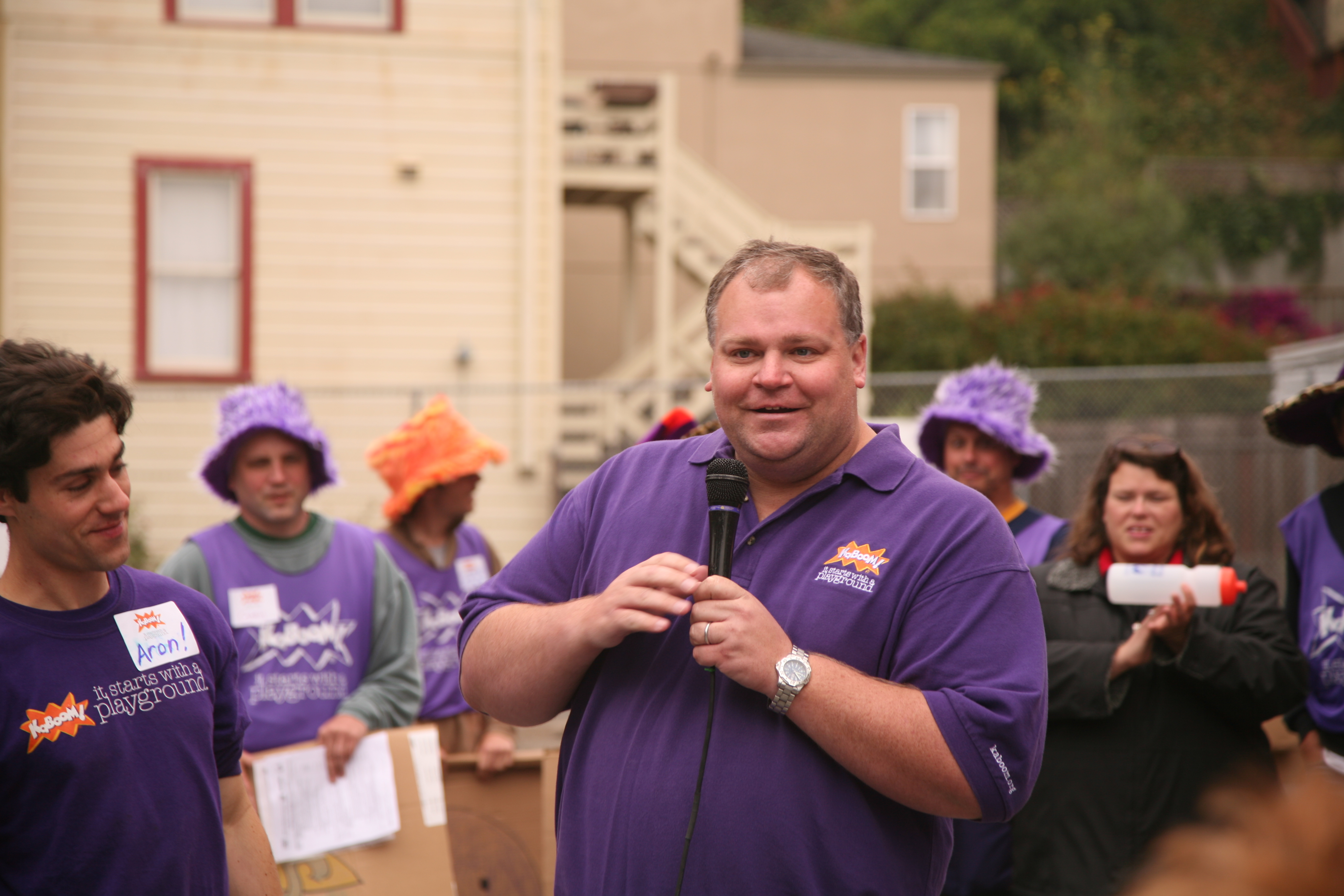
Darell Hammond at an event in July 2008

Inspired by the build, Hammond and Hutchison incorporated KaBOOM! in April 1996, though Hutchison would remain with the new organization for only a year. Hammond became the organization's CEO. When their initial outreach attempts to non-profit foundations proved unsuccessful, they turned to and found support from businesses, beginning with The Home Depot. With the assistance of the business community and Hillary Clinton, who donated money from the sale of her book It Takes a Village, KaBOOM! built 38 playgrounds in 1997. By 2002, the number had risen to 441, and KaBOOM!'s largest corporate partners included The Home Depot, Nike, Target, Computer Associates and Sprint. By 1 October 2010, the organization had completed 1,869 playgrounds.

Hammond remained active in the organization, frequently visiting playground sites under construction or renovation by KaBOOM! around the United States and, in 2000, convincing ice cream manufacturer Ben & Jerry's to create the company's first flavor to be named after a non-profit organization, with an appeal for participation written on the label of the new Kaberry KaBOOM! and different incentives provided around the United States. After hurricanes Katrina and Rita devastated the Gulf Coast in 2005, Hammond pledged to provide 100 playgrounds in the region, a goal he and KaBOOM! surpassed, with 136 playgrounds built as of early September 2010. In 2007, Money magazine indicated that Hammond spent "75% of his work life attending builds, wooing donors, speaking at conferences, and trying to persuade lawmakers of the social value of play." Hammond also attends conferences and universities as a speaker to discuss his work. In addition, he is a blogger at The Huffington Post.

In 2015, Hammond stepped down as CEO from KaBOOM!, but continues to serve KaBOOM! in an advisory capacity.

== Memoir ==
Hammond released a memoir, KaBOOM! How One Man Built a Movement to Save Play, in April 2011. Published in hardcover by Rodale, Inc., the book reached The New York Times' best-selling list for "Hardcover Nonfiction" in May, 2011, at #4. The book traces Hammond's life from childhood to CEO.

== Honors and awards ==
Since launching KaBOOM!, Hammond has personally received a number of honors and awards, including the President's Volunteer Service Award. Diet Coke honored Hammond in 1999 as one of five winners of its national "Making a Difference Award". Hammond was named among the "40 Under 40" by Crain's Chicago Business. Hammond was elected to the Fellowship of Ashoka: Innovators for the Public in 2003. In 2004, he was named among the "Power and Influence Top 50" by Non-Profit Times. In 2008, Hammond was honored by the Jefferson Awards for Public Service for "Greatest Public Service Benefiting the Disadvantaged" and by the New York University Stern School of Business with its "Satter Social Entrepreneur of the Year Award". In 2010, Hammond received the first American Express NGen Leadership Award, given to recognize professionals under 40 in the nonprofit sector who have had a transformative impact on a socially critical issue, and was also honored by the Washington Business Journal among its "40 Under 40" to recognize "the Washington region's brightest young business leaders". In 2008, Ripon University bestowed upon him an honorary degree. He was listed in the Forbes 2011 list of the top 30 social entrepreneurs and was named as a "Health hero" by WebMD. He was also named as a Schwab social entrepreneur by the Schwab Foundation.
