= Joel Spira (businessman) =

American businessman (1927–2015)

Joel Solon Spira
- Born: March 1, 1927; New York City, New York, U.S.
- Died: April 8, 2015 (aged 88); Springfield Township, Pennsylvania, U.S.
- Occupations: inventor, entrepreneur, business magnate
- Known for: invention of the first solid-state-electronic dimmer and founder of Lutron Electronics Company

Joel Solon Spira (March 1, 1927 – April 8, 2015) was an American inventor, entrepreneur, and business magnate.

He invented a version of the light-dimmer switch for use in homes around the United States and led his Lutron Electronics Company into the production of lighting controllers.

== Early life and education ==
Spira was born in New York City in 1927 to a Jewish family.

He received a Bachelor of Science degree in physics from Purdue University in West Lafayette, Indiana, in 1948 and later sponsored, along with his wife, The Ruth and Joel Spira Award for Outstanding Teaching at Purdue's School of Mechanical Engineering.

== Career ==
In the 1950s, Spira worked for an aerospace company, where he was assigned to develop a reliable trigger for atomic weapons. Suggested by others at the laboratory, he used designs based on the thyristor, a solid-state semiconductor switch. During his research, he recognized that the device could also be employed to vary the intensity of light powered by alternating current.

Lighting dimmers existed at the time, but were expensive, complicated, and necessitated the use of large rheostats, about 10 in (25 cm) in size. This was because they operated by resistively dropping the current flowing through lights connected them, generating large amounts of waste heat which had to be dissipated. Though these dimming devices were already in use for theater lighting, they were far too big and bulky for use in homes. Spira successfully implemented a design using thyristors, which were small enough to fit into the wall box that housed a standard light switch. Unlike theatrical dimmers, Spira's standalone device was small enough for home application. Thyristor-based designs (compared to rheostats) instead "chop" the incoming AC mains waveform, quickly switching their level of conductance (and the attached lights' brightness). Compared to a rheostat-based circuit, the use of a thyristor greatly increases efficiency, as far less waste heat is generated. Dimming lights with a solid-state dimmer also reduces total power draw, unlike rheostat dimmers. Spira's design (and most modern dimmers) rely on the use of AC power, and on the characteristics of incandescent lights. Most importantly, incandescent lights take time to cool down when switched off, and so are much less prone to flickering than other kinds of lighting. LED lights are especially prone to flickering when used with traditional dimmers.

He resigned from his job at the aerospace laboratory to concentrate on refining the device. Spira then went on to conduct experiments on a ping-pong table in his Riverside Drive apartment in New York City, leading to his marketable design.

=== Lutron Electronics Company ===
Spira became—as a result of his discovery—best known for his initial, seminal invention: the first successful solid-state-electronic dimmer. He filed for a patent on July 15, 1959 (U.S. 3,032,688). On the basis of the dimmer alone, he and his wife Ruth Rodale Spira, who was an active associate, founded the Lutron Electronics Company in Coopersburg, Pennsylvania, in 1961. The privately held firm, whose headquarters remain there today, has grown into an international manufacturer and distributor not only of dimmers, but also of motorized and automated window-covering systems, as well as lighting fixtures and temperature controls.

Spira headed the firm for 54 years and more recently became chair of the board and research director.

== Death ==
Spira died April 8, 2015, at the age of 88 from a heart attack in Springfield Township, Pennsylvania.

== Legacy ==
Spira was awarded the ASME Leonardo Da Vinci Award in 2000 by the American Society of Mechanical Engineers
