= Best Life (magazine) =

Defunct US luxury service magazine for men

- Jay-Z on the cover of the magazine's April 2009 issue
- Editor: Steve Perrine
- Categories: Health lifestyle
- Frequency: Monthly
- Publisher: Rodale, Inc.
- Founded: 2004
- Final issue: May 2009
- Country: United States
- Based in: Emmaus, Pennsylvania
- Language: English
- Website: www.bestlifeonline.com

Best Life is an American men’s magazine. It was spun off from Men's Health in 2004. Published by Rodale, the print magazine was in circulation until May 2009. Its contributors included David Mamet and Jay McInerney. In May 2012, it was announced that Best Life would be returning in October 2012 as a special-interest publication.
