= Nelson Saldana =

American racing cyclist

Nelson Saldana is a former American track cycling Champion originally from Kew Gardens, Queens, New York. Saldana was a Gold Medal winner in the Team Pursuit at the 1975 Pan American Games He was also the 1977 USA Men's Point Race National Champion as well as 1972 Junior Men's track champion.

In 2006 Nelson Saldana was inducted into the Lehigh Valley Velodrome's Hall of Fame.

== New York State Trooper ==
In 1996, as a New York State Police diver, Saldana participated in the investigation of the crash of TWA Flight 800.
