= Valley Preferred Cycling Center =

Velodrome in Breinigsville, Pennsylvania

VPCC
- Lehigh Valley Velodrome; The Velodrome

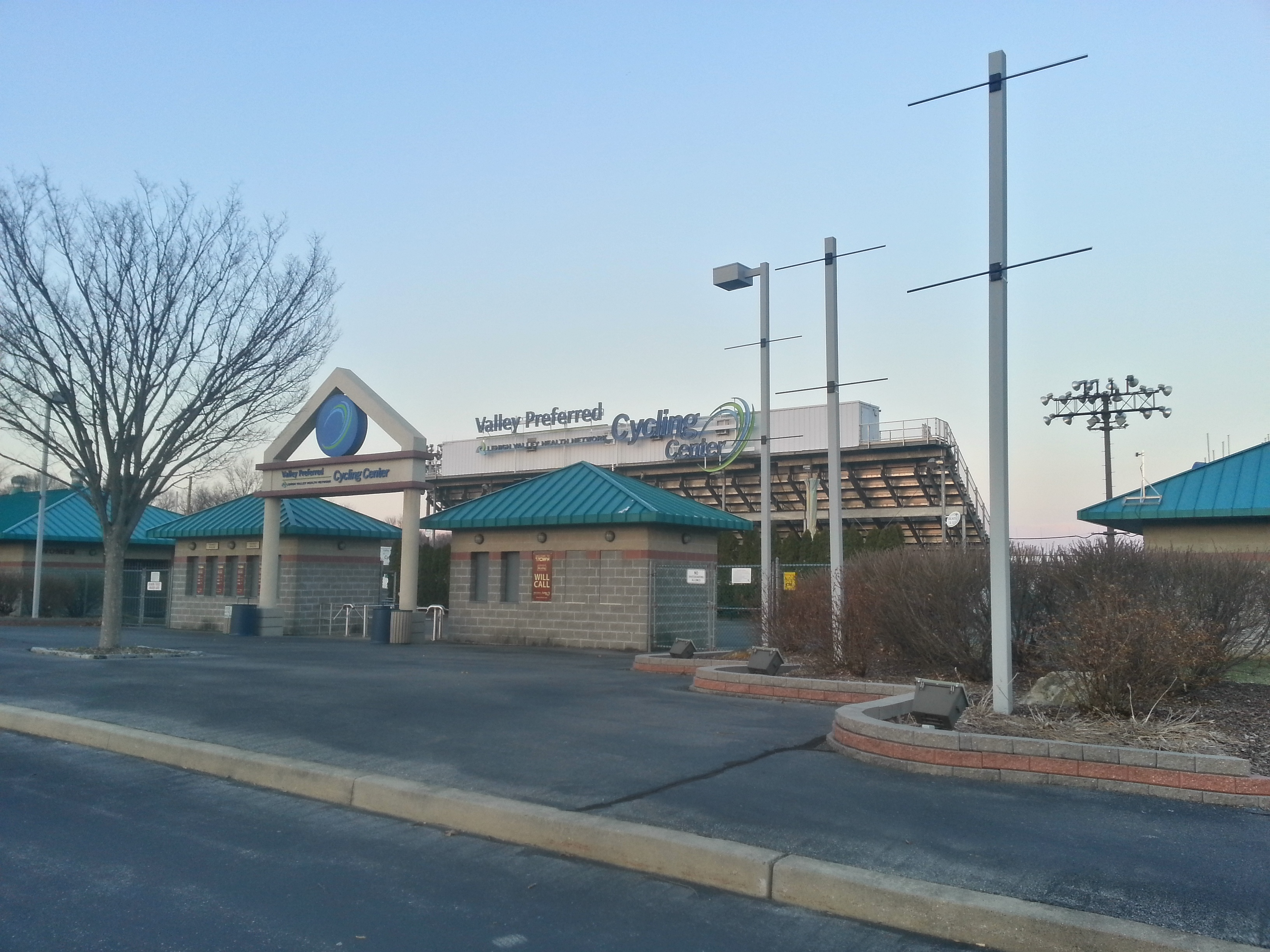
- Valley Preferred Cycling Center in Breinigsville, Pennsylvania, March 2014
- Interactive map of VPCC
- Full name: The Valley Preferred Cycling Center
- Location: 1151 Mosser Rd, Breinigsville, Pennsylvania 18031
- Coordinates: 40°32′51″N 75°36′38″W
- Owner: Lehigh County
- Operator: Velodrome Fund, Inc. (501(c)(3))
- Capacity: 2,500
- Surface: Concrete with a concrete apron
- Field size: 333 m or 1,093 ft track

Construction
- Groundbreaking: 1974
- Opened: August 1975
- Expanded: 1995

Tenants
- Lehigh Valley Cycling Club; T-Town Elite; Individual Olympic cyclists

Website
- www.thevelodrome.com

The Valley Preferred Cycling Center (VPCC), also known as the Lehigh Valley Velodrome or simply T-Town, is a professional cycling center and a velodrome located in Breinigsville, Pennsylvania. It serves as the Lehigh Valley's main track cycling stadium. The velodrome is operated by Velodrome Fund, a non-profit organization. that promotes competitive cycling, youth fitness, and adult wellness activities for the Lehigh Valley.

The velodrome has hosted various cycling championships. VPCC is the home of the World Series of Bicycling. The Velodrome annually hosts the USA Cycling Elite Nationals qualifying event. The center also features a Cycling Hall of Fame. Over the past 40 years, the center introduced tens of thousands of people to cycling, producing over 140 national champions, seven world champions, and three Olympic medalists.

== History ==
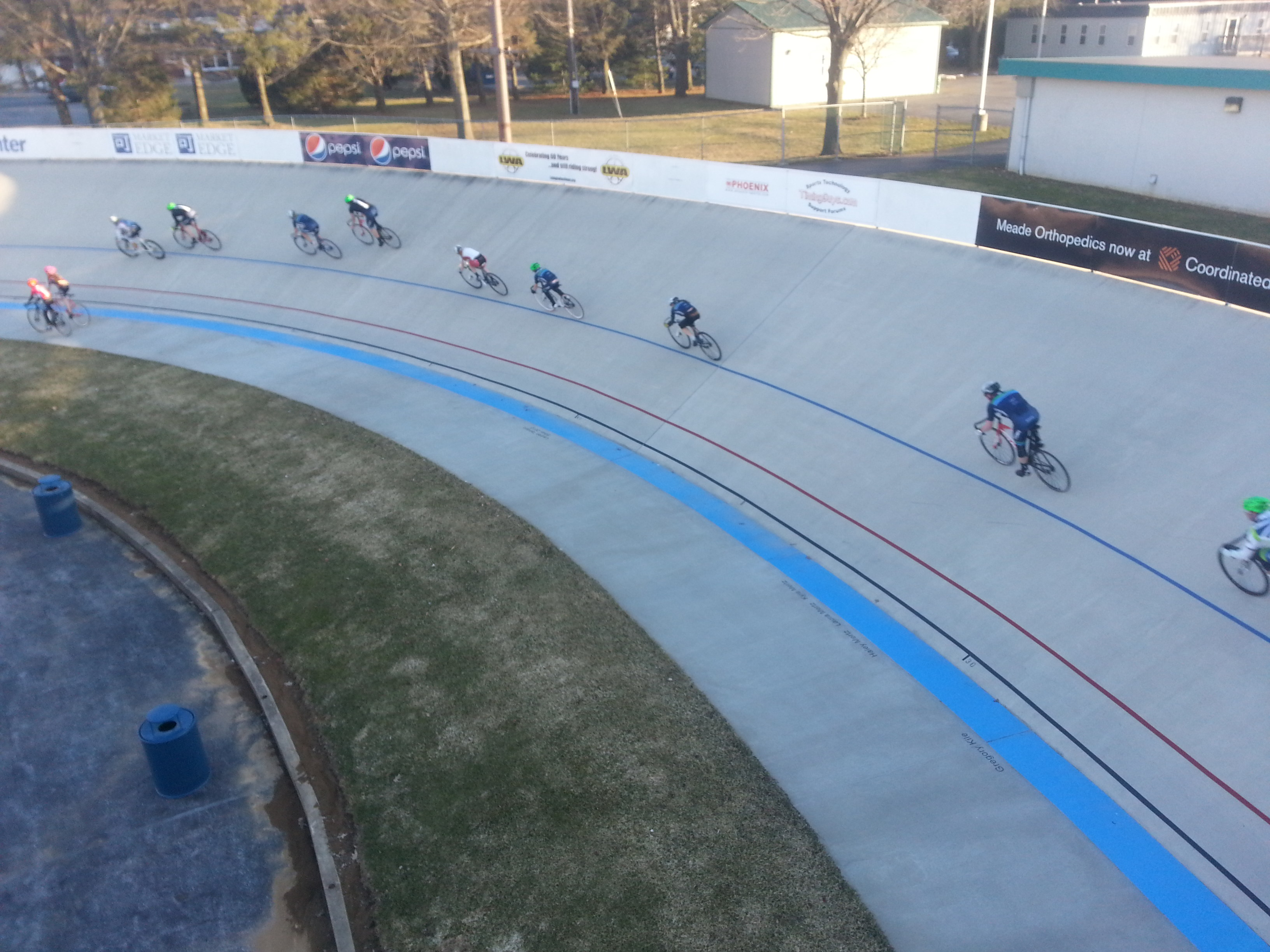
Cyclists practice at Valley Preferred Cycling Center in Breinigsville, Pennsylvania

The velodrome was launched in the early 1970s by Robert Rodale, publisher of Rodale, Inc. in nearby Emmaus. Rodale became interested in cycling while competing in the Pan-American Games in Winnipeg, Canada in 1967. In 1974 construction broke ground on the plot of land that was owned by Bob Rodale and his wife, Ardath. The first race was held on October 12, 1975. The Velodrome was originally called the Lehigh County Velodrome or simply T-town, due to its close proximity to Trexlertown. The center underwent a number of renovations which added rest rooms, seats for the fans, a podium, showers, and changing rooms.

In 1995, the center underwent a major $2.5M renovations in preparation for the 1996 Summer Olympics cycling trials. In 2008, extensive repairs and resurfacing were done to the Velodrome.

In 2007, Valley Preferred Health Network bought the naming rights to the center, and the velodrome's name became Valley Preferred Cycling Center.

In 2008, the town of Breinigsville offered land to expand the center to include a hall of fame. Today, the center is part of a 103-acre Bob Rodale Cycling and Fitness Park.

== Competitions ==
The center hosted various competitions over the years including the UCI Track Cycling World Cup and the UCI Juniors Track World Championships. It is the home of the World Series of Bicycling, a series of races every Friday night between Memorial Day and Labor Day and the annual USA Cycling Elite Nationals qualifying event. Additionally many other smaller regional, national championships and international competitions also take place, bringing many track cyclists from across North and South America. Most recently, the VPCC hosted the 2016 USA Cycling Elite and Junior National Track Championships.

VPCC offers a variety of free or low-cost community cycling programs designed to introduce the public to the sport of track cycling, including Try the Track, the spring and fall Bicycling Racing League, and Air Products Development Program.

== Specifications ==
The velodrome is outdoor and uncovered. The track is 1093.6 ft (333.3 m) in length with a concrete surface. The track has 30-degree banked turns and 12.5-degree straightaways. At the bottom of the track is an 8 feet (2.4 m) concrete apron. Time trial lines are painted on the track as well.

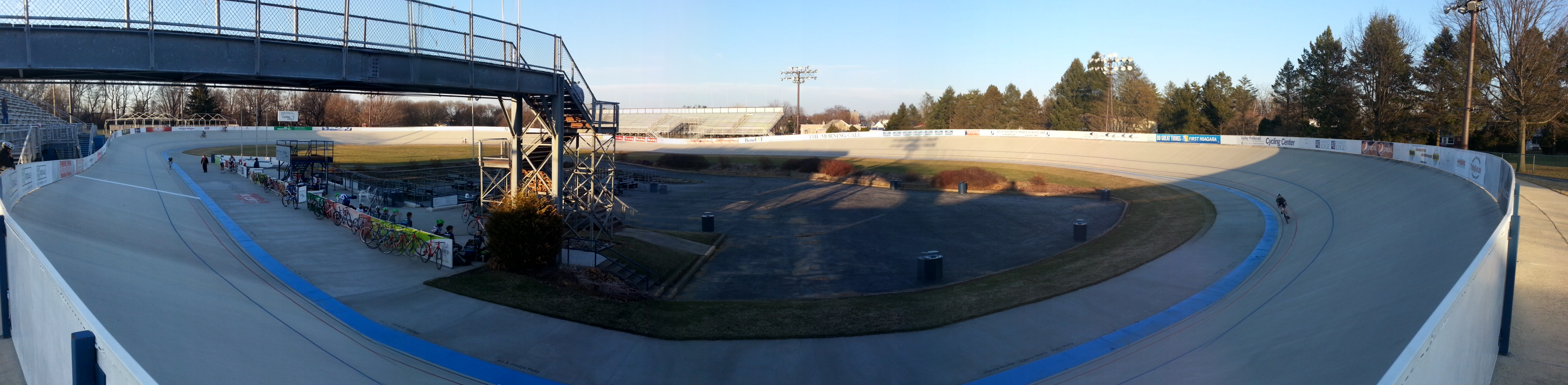
View of the track

== Cycling Hall of Fame ==
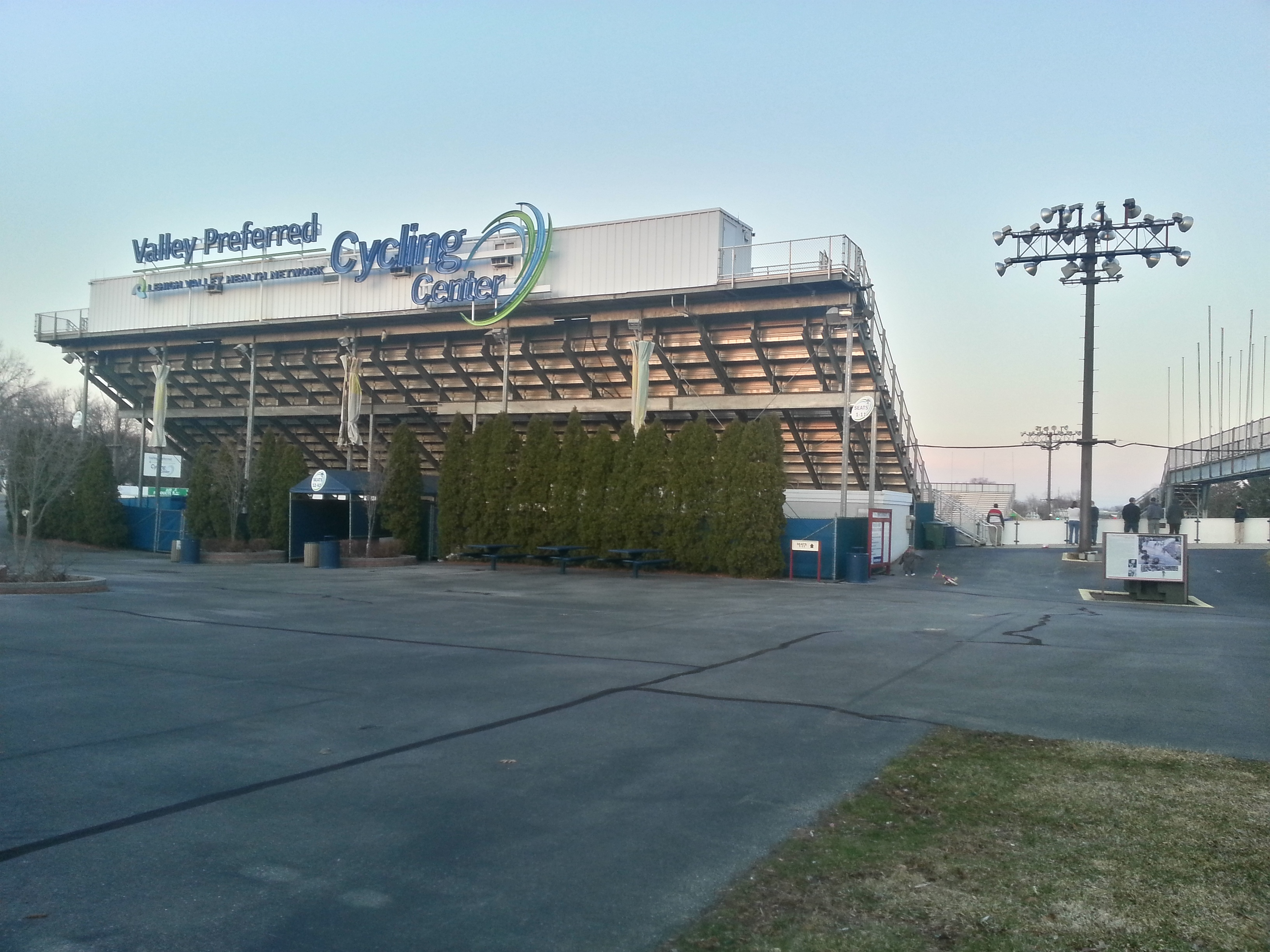
Main seating area of Valley Preferred Cycling Center

The Lehigh Valley Velodrome houses a Cycling Hall of Fame. Members of the hall of fame include:

- Jerry Ash, World Silver Medalist Tandem Sprint 1978
- Leigh Barczewski, American Olympic cyclist
- Karen Bliss, American cyclist
- Dave Chauner, American cyclist
- Danny Clark, Australia Olympic track cyclist and road bicycle racer
- Bruce Donaghy, American cyclist
- Jane Eickhoff, Olympic track cyclist
- Alaric J. F. Gayfer, British National Track Cycling Champion
- Curtis Harnett, Canadian racing cyclist
- Gil Hatton, Junior World Champion 1974
- Patrick Gellineau, Trinidad and Tobago Olympic cyclist
- Artie Greenberg, UCI commissar from Pennsylvania
- Ian Jackson, professional cyclist
- Art McHugh, professional cyclist
- Paul Pearson, professional cyclist
- Nicole Reinhart, American professional track and road racing cyclist
- Mary Jane Reoch, Track Cycling World Champion
- Ardath Rodale, organizer
- Robert Rodale, founder, publisher, Olympic rifle shooter
- Nelson Saldana, American track cycling champion
- Hubert Schleh, Velodrome organizer
- Gordon Singleton, Canada's first World Champion cyclist
- Lucy Tyler, Australian Olympic and World Champion cyclist
- Jack Simes, Olympian and Olympic coach
- Nelson Vails, American Olympic track cyclist
- Shaun Wallace, British Olympic cyclist
- Mark Whitehead, American Olympic cyclist

== VeloFest ==
VeloFest is the largest cycling marketplace in the United States. It's held twice a year in May and October on the infield of the Valley Preferred Cycling Center. The flea market features hundreds of vendors with thousands of cycling enthusiasts visiting each year.

== See also ==
- List of cycling tracks and velodromes
