= Universal Media Co. =

Australian magazine publisher

- Company type: Private
- Industry: Print media, hypermedia
- Genre: Niche Media products
- Founded: 1986
- Headquarters: North Ryde, New South Wales, Australia
- Key people: Prema Perera (CEO); Vicky Mahadeva (CFO); Janice Williams (publisher); Emma Perera (associate publisher)
- Products: Magazines, websites
- Services: Advertising, creative services, publishing
- Subsidiaries: Australian Publishing Company; Universal Online Media; Universal WellBeing; Completehome.com.au Media Group; Paper Pocket Group; Westwick Farrow Media
- Website: umco.com.au www.universalshop.com.au www.paperpocket.com.au www.completehome.com.au www.wellbeing.com.au

Universal Media Co. (formerly Universal Magazines) is an Australian publisher of magazines, websites, and calendar products that cater to niche markets. Prema Perera is currently CEO of the company.

In 2018, Universal Magazines rebranded as Universal Media Co and increased the development of its digital channels.

In 2019, Universal Magazines sold Pool+Spa to the Swimming Pool and Spa Association of Australia. In 2022, Universal Media Co. added its magazines to Readly's selection.

== Media brands ==
=== Home ===
- Australian Country
- Backyard Magazine (relaunched in 2015)
- Bathroom Yearbook
- Build Home
- Complete Home
- Complete Wedding
- Choosing A School
- Grand Designs Australia (launched in 2012)
- Home Design
- Kit Home
- Kitchens & Bathrooms Quarterly
- Kitchen Yearbook
- Luxury Kitchens & Bathrooms
- Outdoor Design & Living
- Outdoor Rooms
- Period Style
- Poolside
- Poolside Design Showcase
- Renovate
- completehome.com.au
- australiancountry.com.au
- schoolchoice.com.au
- bridescollective.com

=== Lifestyle ===
- Australian Country
- Dogs Life
- WellBeing
- Wellbeing.com.au
- dogslife.com.au
- "Wild"
- "Being"

=== Motorbike ===
- Australian Cruiser & Trike
- Australian Road Rider
- Dirt Action
- Retro Bike
- Trail Rider
- roadrider.com.au
- dirtaction.com.au

=== Craft ===
- Australian Beading
- Complete Craft
- Australian Homespun
- Quilters Companion
- Scrapbook Creations
- Homespun.net.au

=== B2B ===
- Outdoor Design Source
- outdoordesign.com.au
