= Kona Bicycle Company =

American bicycle company

Kona Bikes
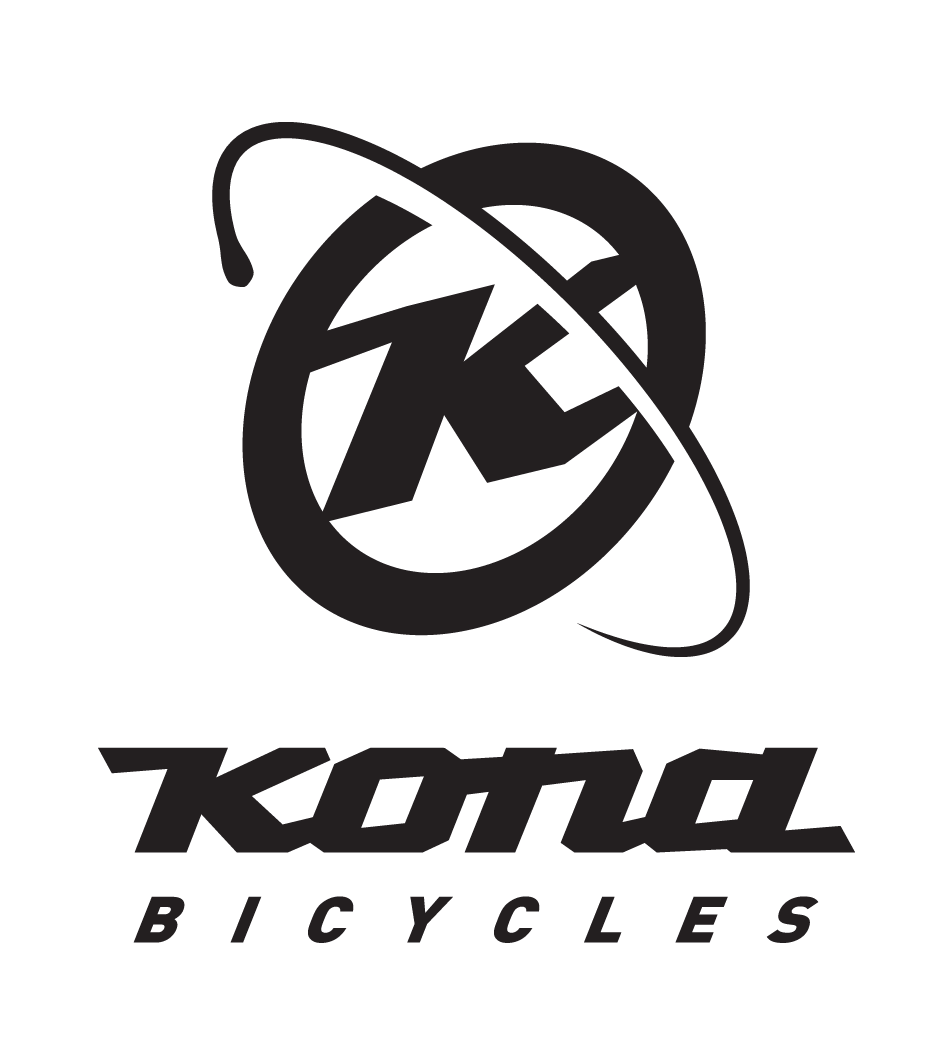
- Kona Logo as of April 2022
- Type: Private
- Industry: Bicycles
- Founded: 1988; 38 years ago
- Headquarters: Ferndale, Washington, United States
- Key people: Dan Gerhard, Jacob Heilbron
- Products: Bicycle and Related Components
- Owner: Dan Gerhard, Jacob Heilbron
- Website: www.konaworld.com

Kona Bikes is a bicycle company based in the Pacific Northwest. The company was founded in 1988 by Dan Gerhard, Jacob Heilbron and Jimbo Holmstrom in Vancouver, BC. Their world headquarters are in Ferndale, Washington, USA with Canadian distribution offices in Vancouver, and European distribution offices in Monaco.

Gerhard and Heilbron worked initially with Mountain Bike Hall of Fame rider Joe Murray to create a range of custom steel hardtails. Kona was the first brand to produce a complete range of sloping top tube design mountain bike frames. Paul Brodie collaborated with the TBG and was likely instrumental in implementing the sloping top tube design from previous work with Rocky Mountain and with his own company. The Canadian headquarters are located near the famous North Shore Mountains of Vancouver, leading Kona to develop a range of Freeride mountain bikes in 1998 known for durability as well as for their ability to handle extremely technical downhill terrain. In the 1990s, provocative names were used on Kona bikes and components like Humuhumunukunukuapua'a, Sutra, Sex One, Sex Too, Stinky, Jackshit, while there are rumors about one of their early logos being inspired by an anus, aiming to be placed as an "alternative" bicycle company or as the "smallest biggest company in the world".

Kona has gone on to develop road, commuter, cyclo-cross, and mountain bikes. Kona's bikes are sold in over 60 countries worldwide.

On January 19, 2022, the founders announced the sale of the company to diversified outdoor equipment maker Kent Outdoors. On April 19, 2024, Kent Outdoors began winding down operations with plans to sell the brand.

On May 20, 2024, Gerhard and Heilbron announced that they had re-purchased the brand from Kent Outdoors with plans to re-launch it.

== Kona Factory Team ==
Kona has a long-standing tradition in the support of bicycle racing, beginning with their first product designer Joe Murray who was also a two-time US National mountain bike champion. Many elite riders have been part of the Kona Team including 2012 Giro D'Italia winner Ryder Hesjedal (CAN), Two time World Champion cross country mountain biker 2001, 2002 Roland Green (Can), World Downhill Champions Steve Peat (UK) and Greg Minnaar (RSA), 2004/2005 World Downhill Champion Fabien Barel (FR), World Cup Downhill Champion Tracy Moseley (UK), and US National Mountain Bike and Cyclo-Cross champions Ryan Trebon and Anne Knapp. Over 200 National and World Champions have been won by Kona riders. The current Kona Factory team competes in National and International events and includes riders from Canada, the UK, Australia, France and the US.

=== Cory Wallace ===
After finishing fourth in the World Solo 24HR Championships in 2015, and 2nd in 2016, Kona Factory Team rider Cory Wallace won the event 3 consecutive years, from 2017 to 2019. Due to the global COVID-19 pandemic, the event was unable to proceed in 2020 and 2021, however in 2022 Wallace once again defended his world title. Wallace won all four championships while riding a Kona Hei Hei CRDL.

== Advocacy ==
Kona has been an International Mountain Biking Association corporate supporter since 1994, and has developed fundraising projects including the Kona Buck-A-Bike program, the Kona Bro Deal program, the Interbike bowling tourney and Kona/IMBA Freeriding grants.

The Kona/IMBA bowling party, held at Interbike from 1998 until 2007, raised money for NEMBA, a New England IMBA-related advocacy group. Its purpose was to help purchase a large area for mountain biking by funding the KONA/IMBA freeride grants. The Kona/IMBA Freeride grants helped clubs throughout the US and Canada including:Rapid City, South Dakota; Grand Junction, Colorado; Hood River, Oregon; Coquitlam, British Columbia; St. Charles, Missouri; Surrey, British Columbia; Anderson, Indiana, and East Burke, Vermont. The grants helped build freeride features on trails, as well as building dirt jump parks in parks.

For 2008, Kona sponsored the IMBA Epic Rides program, helping fund four new rides throughout the United States and Canada. The trails set aside as Epic rides for 2008 were the Mid Mountain Epic in Park City, Utah; Comfortably Numb in Whistler, British Columbia; the trails sponsored by PAMBA outside of Peoria, Illinois, and the Loon Lake Epic in Tamarack, Idaho.

=== Kona Africabike ===
In 2006, Kona began its largest advocacy effort to date - BikeTown Africa. The Kona Africabike was a bike built in partnership with Bristol-Myers Squibb and Bicycling Magazine. The Kona Africabike was designed specifically to assist health care workers treating HIV and AIDS patients with the delivery of home health aids and other services in African Cities, starting with Bobonong, Botswana and Gaborone, Botswana. More recent projects have included Delft and Stellenbosch.

For 2008, Kona pledged to donate 1,000 Africabikes for the project and due to the overwhelming customer support of this project, Kona set up a non-profit/humanitarian organization from their European HQ in Geneva, Switzerland called Kona Basic Needs. This organisation's aim is to continue to raise more funds and awareness of the Kona Africabike program and to continue the donation of these bikes..
