= Maria Rodale =

Maria Rodale is an American businesswoman and author who was chief executive officer and chairman of Rodale, Inc., an Emmaus, Pennsylvania-based publisher of health, wellness, and environmental content. She is the third generation of the Rodale family to lead the company founded by her grandfather J. I. Rodale in 1930, then led by both her father Robert Rodale and subsequent to that by her mother, Ardath Rodale.

A lifelong advocate for organic farming and gardening, Rodale is author of five books, including Organic Manifesto: How Organic Farming Can Heal Our Planet, Feed the World, and Keep Us Safe, published by Rodale Books in 2011. She has a blog entitled Maria's Farm Country Kitchen.

== Early life and education ==
Rodale was born in Allentown, Pennsylvania to Robert David “Bob” Rodale and his wife Ardath Harter Rodale. She grew up on the family's farm along with two sisters and two brothers. She went on to attend Muhlenberg College, also in Allentown, where she double majored in communications and art, earning a bachelor's degree in 1985.

== Career ==
Rodale joined the family business Rodale, Inc. in 1987, first working in circulation and direct marketing and eventually leading Rodale's in-house direct marketing agency. In 1998, she was the company's director of strategy, where she led strategic reviews, planning processes, and management changes that refocused Rodale on publishing information on healthy, active lifestyles. She also led the company's Organic Living division, Rodale's first integrated brand division, where she was editor-in-chief of Organic Gardening magazine and oversaw all of Rodale's gardening books. She joined the Rodale board in 1991 and was elected chairman of it in 2007. In 2009, she was named to Pennsylvania's "Best 50 Women in Business" list, published by the Eastern Pennsylvania Business Journal.

She is co-chair of The Rodale Institute.

== Books ==
Rodale has written or co-authored five books:

- Organic Manifesto: How Organic Farming Can Heal Our Planet, Feed the World, and Keep Us Safe (2011, Rodale Books) ISBN 978-1-60961-136-1
- It's My Pleasure: A Revolutionary Plan to Free Yourself from Guilt and Create the Life You Want (2005, Free Press) with Maya Rodale. ISBN 0-7432-7081-9
- Betty's Book of Laundry Secrets (2001, Rodale Books) with Betty Faust. ISBN 0-87596-933-X
- Maria Rodale's Organic Gardening Companion (2000, Rodale Books) ISBN 0-87596-835-X
- Maria Rodale's Organic Gardening (Your Seasonal Companion to Creating a Beautiful and Delicious Organic Garden) (1998, Rodale Press) ISBN 0-87596-799-X
