= Men's Health =

Magazine

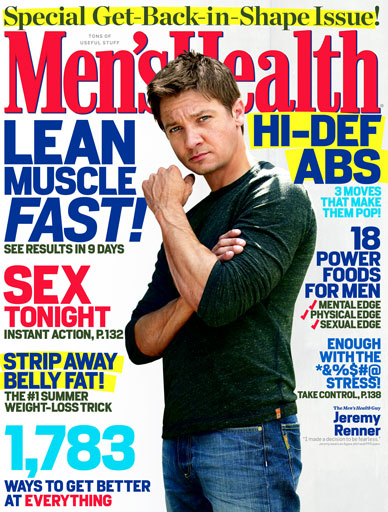
- Cover of September 2010 issue featuring Jeremy Renner
- Editor-In-Chief: Richard Dorment (2018–present)
- Former editors: Matt Bean (2016–2018); Bill Phillips (2012–2016); David Zinczenko (2000–2012); Greg Gutfeld (1999–2000); Mike Lafavore (1988–1999); Mark Bricklin (1986–1988)
- Categories: Physical fitness Nutrition; Human sexuality Fashion
- Frequency: Quarterly
- Publisher: Hearst
- Total circulation: 1,819,151 (December 2014)
- Founded: 1986
- Country: United States
- Based in: New York City, New York, U.S.
- Language: English
- Website: MensHealth.com (US); MensHealth.com.au (Australia)
- ISSN: 1054-4836

Men's Health (MH), published by Hearst, is the world's largest men's magazine brand, with 35 editions in 59 countries; it is the bestselling men's magazine on American newsstands.

Started as a men's health magazine by Rodale, Inc. in Emmaus, Pennsylvania, the magazine currently covers various men's lifestyle topics such as fitness, nutrition, fashion and sexuality. The magazine's website, MensHealth.com, averages over 118 million page views a month.

== History ==
Started by Mark Bricklin in the US in 1986 as a health magazine, Men's Health evolved into a lifestyle magazine, covering fitness, nutrition, relationships, travel, technology, fashion and finance. Bricklin, Rodale, Inc. editors Larry Stains and Stefan Bechtel produced three newsstand test issues. The results led Rodale to start Men's Health as a quarterly magazine in 1988 and begin to sell subscriptions.

Bricklin, who was editor-in-chief of Prevention magazine, appointed Michael J. Lafavore (born April 28, 1952) as editor of Men's Health that year. In his 12 years as editor-in-chief, Mike Lafavore increased the circulation from 100,000 to over 1.5 million, increased publication to ten 10 times a year, and expanded the magazine to Australia, France, Germany, Mexico, Russia, South Africa, and the UK. The South African version, along with Women's Health, is licensed for publication by Media24, with distribution by Magzter.

He created the editorial formula, and hired Steven Slon from service journalism and Greg Gutfeld from Prevention. He worked with longtime staff editor Denis Boyles, a former Playboy contributing editor, to develop the magazine's voice. Lafavore left Men's Health in 2000, the same year Capell's Circulation Report named the magazine Circulation Performer of the Decade. He named Gutfeld his successor. After one year, Gutfeld was replaced by David Zinczenko.

Zinczenko became editor-in-chief in 2000. Circulation increased 30 percent, ad pages by 80 percent from 700 to 1150. In 2000, the brand had 21 international editions. In 2001 the title was consistently selling 400,000 copies at newsstands and circulation was 1.6 million. In 2001, the magazine started the annual list of cities with the healthiest men, based on twenty "live-long parameters, including death rates (both homicide and disease); illness rates (high blood pressure, heart disease, stroke, etc.); body-mass index; fitness training; even environmental factors like number of parks, golf courses, etc." In 2003, the circulation was 1.7 million. In 2006, the circulation was close to 1.8 million.

Men's Health magazine has been criticized for its focus on physical health, which can increase men's anxieties about their bodies, making them more prone to eating disorders and compulsive over-exercising. The New York Times stated, "Since its debut in the late 1980s, the magazine has surpassed traditional men's books like Esquire and GQ by following the formula of best-selling women's magazines—by catering to men's anxieties about their bodies and sexual performance." Columbia Journalism Review stated the magazine "deals overwhelmingly with self-care and, in fact, exaggerates the possibilities for autonomous personal transformation." Editor-in-chief Zinczenko argued that the magazine worked toward "overcoming the resistance of the 86-percent male audience to health as a subject" and redefining health as "inclusive of everything that could improve a man's life. Great sex. Great food. Endorphin-boosting exercise. Looking and feeling your best. We turned health into a concept every guy would want to embrace, starting with the healthy guy on the cover."

Men's Health has been criticized for reusing cover taglines. Zinczenko replied that 80 percent of magazine sales are by subscription, and those covers differ from the newsstand version. "Twenty years of Men's Health has certainly produced several lines that have proven themselves effective at newsstand, which makes up about 20 percent of our print run. We plan to keep using the most effective marketing tools to reach the largest market we possibly can." In July 2010, the magazine was criticized for including tiny credit lines on the cover rather than inside as a possible quid-pro-quo for advertisers. Zinczenko said the lines saved readers from having to dig for information and that Men's Health had been including the lines for over a year regardless of advertiser status. A spokesperson for the American Society of Magazine Editors said that no rules were broken. The director for print strategy at a media firm said the mention was "too small of a plug to get brands excited."

In 2004, Men's Health began putting celebrities and athletes on the cover, and with their shirts on—a departure from the covers of the 1990s. In 2004, Rodale filed suit against Men's Fitness for its redesign, "a copycat version—one that is obviously intended to confuse consumers."

In May 2006, the magazine published a limited edition color cover of Josh Holloway. In the first half of 2006, newsstand sales for Men's Health rose from 492,000 to 544,000 during a price increase from $3.95 to $4.50. In 2006 Rodale's properties, including Men's Health, tried to increase online content by adding video to each section, telling section editors to write blogs, and hiring an online ad sales director.

In 2008, the magazine partnered with Google to make back issues available. In July 2008, Men's Health became the first to "create the first fully interactive advertising magazine in America," where readers could take a picture of an ad, and a promotional "bounce-back" was sent to their phone. For its 20th-anniversary issue in November 2008, Men's Health included an interview and photo shoot with president-elect Barack Obama. In 2010, Obama was again featured about health care and his plans.

In 2009, Men's Health published Belly Off! Diet based on the weight-loss testimonial column in the magazine. The column "Eat This, Not That!" became a book series in 2007, written by Zinczenko and Matt Goulding), and was turned into different versions (children, supermarket, restaurant, diet book) and free iPhone applications. EatThis.MensHealth.com was the most highly trafficked section of MensHealth.com in 2009 with 1 million unique visitors and 15 million page views a month.

Editor-in-chief Matt Bean led the magazine in developing over 40 mobile apps for the iPhone, Android and BlackBerry. "Eat This, Not That! The Game" won an American Society of Magazine Editors award for Best Interactive Tool and was downloaded 500,000 times in two weeks. The magazine's first application, "Men's Health Workouts", was in the top 10 in the Health and Fitness category. In September 2009, the column "Ask Jimmy the Bartender" was turned into an iPhone and iPad application, which was downloaded 50,000 times in its first month. In 2010, Men's Health became one of the first consumer magazines to enter the iPad market.

In 2011, David Zinczenko was replaced by Bill Phillips, who was the executive editor of the magazine and editor of MensHealth.com.

In November 2014, Men's Health featured a reader on the cover for the first time with amputee and veteran Noah Galloway, the winner of the first Ultimate Men's Health Guy Search.

In February 2015, Men's Health won the National Magazine Award for General Excellence.

In 2016, Matt Bean became editor-in-chief. He hired Creative Director Mike Schnaidt to redesign the magazine with visual updates inspired by media, such as auto repair guides, hiking maps, and military field manuals, added "The Exchange", "Unfiltered", "Field Guide" and a column by Tim Ferriss. He introduced the digital franchise MH Longform. In October 2017 Men's Health began the cross-platform series "The Adventurist" in partnership with Fitbit.

== Spin-offs ==
In 2000, MH-18, a youth-oriented version of Men's Health covering teen lifestyle, was spun off but ceased publication in November 2001.

In 2004 under Zinczenko's direction, Men's Health spun off Best Life. May 2009 was Best Life's last issue. Best Life was published 10 times a year and had a circulation of more than 500,000. Stephen Perrine, the former editorial creative director at Men's Health, was the editor-in-chief. David Zinczenko was the editorial director. In March 2008, Best Life finished #2 on Adweek's prestigious "10 under 50" Hot List, which recognizes magazines with fewer than $50 million in ad revenue.

In 2005, Men's Health spun off Women's Health. The test-issue team was headed by Bill Stump, a former Men's Health editor who was then the head of Rodale Inc.'s New Product Development department, and included former director of new product development Andréa Mallard. Within a year the circulation was at 750,000. Women's Health magazine is now published 10 times a year. In January 2009, Michele Promaulayko was named editor-in-chief of Women's Health. In March 2008, Women's Health finished #1 on Adweek's "10 under 50" Hot List. The magazine was named #2 on Advertising Age's 2008 A List. Women's Health has a circulation of 1.1 million.

In 2007, Men's Health spun off Men's Health Living, a newsstand special which was named one of the 30 most notable launches of 2007 by Samir Husni. Samir Husni stated that Men's Health Living is a "new genre of men's magazines that cater to non-woman related issues in a man's life - that has gone unfulfilled for years: interior design and home that meets the needs of the affluent man." The test issue of Men's Health Living was edited by Bill Phillips, executive editor of Men's Health, and Matt Bean. The first issue sold around 200,000 copies at $4.99 each out of 375,000 sent to newsstands. In January 2009, a second Men's Health Living issue was at newsstands, 450,000 copies at $5.99 each.

In 2007, they also spun off Men's Health on Campus as a test with a goal for quarterly publication thereafter.

In 2009, Men's Health spun off Children's Health, a special issue that was part of a Rodale publishing idea to work with President and First Lady Obama to show support for the Patient Protection and Affordable Care Act. The magazine published how-to stories about fitness and nutrition for children.

In 2013, Men's Health launched the radio show Men's Health Live in partnership with Entertainment Radio Network.

In April 2017, under Matt Bean, Men's Health released an online video franchise, MH Films, which has featured people such as Hafþór Björnsson, Erik Weihenmayer and Sam Calagione. In June 2017, the magazine launched MH Rec Room, specializing in shorter videos for social media featuring various fitness trainers, lifestyle influencers, and authors.

== Awards and honors ==
In March 1994, Advertising Age magazine named Mike Lafavore Editor of the Year. [March 6, 1994]. Four years later he won the International Herald Tribune Award for International Editor of the Year for his work on Men's Health foreign editions. The magazine was nominated for several National Magazine Awards, including General Excellence. Since 2000, Men's Health has been nominated for 17 National Magazine Awards, or "Ellies," which are administrated by Columbia University's Graduate School of Journalism and presented by the American Society of Magazine Editors.

Men's Health won the category of Personal Service in 2004, the first win for the magazine and Rodale. In 2010, Men's Health received the General Excellence award. Menshealth.com's "Eat This, Not That!" portion of their Web site won the 2010 Digital Ellies award, also sponsored by the ASME, for best Interactive Tool, an award honoring the outstanding use of interactive tools that enable readers to create or share content, participate in communities, improve the quality of their lives, or enjoy recreational activities. In 2010, Minonline.com deemed menshealth.com's personal trainer channel, the "Best Premium Site," an award recognizing subscription sites oriented around service. In 2011, Men's Health won an Ad Age Media Vanguard Award in the Print-to-Digital Best Reader-Service Website category, a Society of Publication Designers Award for design and photography, and an ASME Ellie in the category of Personal Service for "I Want My Prostate Back" by Larry Stains. It was also a finalist in the 2012 Ellies.

In 2012, Men's Health won the Digital Magazine Awards' Magazine Launch of the Year for its iPhone edition and a 2012 National Magazine Award in the Personal Service, Digital Media category for "Skin Cancer Center".

In 2013, Men's Health won the James Beard Foundation Book, Broadcast, and Journalism Awards for Cooking/Recipes/Instruction and Food Coverage in General Interest Publication categories. The brand was recognized as one of min's Top 20 Magazines on Twitter and the Men's Health "Guy Gourmet" Twitter account was included in the TIME 140 Best Twitter Feeds of 2013. Men's Health won min's Best of the Web award for Overall Digital Excellence and FAME's Best Series of Events Award for its URBANATHALON series. The brand was included in iMonitor's Best Magazine Apps for iPad list.

In 2015, Men's Health won first place in the Service category for the American Society of Journalists and Authors (ASJA)'s Writing Awards for the article "Clucked" by Rachael Moeller Gorman, a min Best of the Web & Digital Award in the "Integration with Print" category, and a FOLIO: Marketing Award in the "Integrated Program" category for the Men's Health Next Top Trainer Program. The magazine also won in the "Lifestyle" category for the American Society of Magazine Editors' Best Cover Awards for its November 2014 cover. It was named Reader's Choice for men's health/fitness magazines in Adweek's 2013, 2014 and 2015 Hot List, and both Editor's Choice and Reader's Choice for the 2016 Hot List.

It was also recognized in 2017 as an Ad Age magazine of the year. In March 2017 Men's Health was named a Print Medal Finalist for the Society of Publication Designers' Annual Design Competition Awards; it was also nominated in 2015 and 2016.

In 2018, Rodale was acquired by Hearst and Men's Health was moved to New York City.

== Global editions ==
June 2014 issues of Australian, German, UK, and US editions showing the use of shared content, in this case a cover image from the same photo set of Hugh Jackman

Although Men's Health was founded in the US, its international editions have made it the world's largest men's magazine brand. These magazines reach over 71 million readers worldwide. Men's Health is published in 35 editions.

International editions account for over 80% of the magazine's trade volume. In each market, local editors commission or purchase articles for their own market and share content with US and other editions. The selected articles are then translated and edited by local staffers to make them match the style of the American edition. Usually, these editions started as translations of the US version of the magazine, but over time many non-US editions became unique, providing material more pertinent to local readers.

- Argentina
- Australia
- Austria
- Bahrain
- Belarus
- Belgium
- Belize
- Brazil
- Canada
- Chile
- China
- Colombia
- Costa Rica
- Croatia (2004–2020)
- Cyprus
- Czech Republic
- Dominican Republic
- Ecuador
- El Salvador
- Estonia
- Germany
- Ghana
- Greece
- Guatemala
- Honduras
- Hungary
- India
- Indonesia (2001–2016)
- Ireland
- Italy
- Japan
- Jordan
- Kazakhstan
- Kuwait
- Latvia
- Lebanon
- Lithuania
- Mexico
- Netherlands
- New Zealand
- Nicaragua
- Nigeria
- Oman
- Panama
- Peru
- Poland (2004–2023)
- Portugal
- Puerto Rico
- Qatar
- Romania
- Russia
- Saudi Arabia
- Serbia (2013–2020)
- Singapore
- South Africa
- South Korea
- Spain
- Switzerland
- Taiwan
- Thailand
- Turkey
- UAE
- United Kingdom: see Men's Health (British magazine)
- Venezuela

== See also ==
- List of men's magazines
- MH-18 magazine
- Nat Mags (British publisher)
