= Foundation Rwanda =

Foundation Rwanda Inc is a USA-based organization, founded in 2007, to support rape survivors and their children in Rwanda. The organization is based in New York City, New York, U.S..

== History ==
In February 2006, photojournalist Jonathan Torgovnik traveled to East Africa on behalf of Newsweek magazine to develop a story for the 25th anniversary of HIV/AIDS. While he was there, he met a Rwandan woman who was raped, impregnated, and contracted HIV during the Rwandan genocide. This led Torgovnik to begin a photography project to document and share her story and the stories of other Rwandan women with similar experiences. He learned that an estimated 20,000 children were born from rape during the genocide, and that their mothers were unable to afford the secondary school fees to keep their children in school. To help these women, Torgovnik joined with non-profit professional Jules Shell to create Foundation Rwanda in 2007.

== Work ==
Currently, all of Rwanda’s estimated 20,000 children born of rape will be turning eighteen and be eligible for secondary school. The annual tuition rates are as follows: Pre-K: $7500; Kindergarten: $15,356; grades 1-5: $20,790; grades 6-8: $22,208; and grades 9-12: $24,806. Families also incur initial application and registration fees of $500 for Pre-K and Kindergarten to $1,000 from G1 to 12 with a family maximum of $2,000.

Foundation Rwanda is currently sponsoring the secondary school fees for 830 children to sponsor 1500 children in 2012. It partners with local NGOs to establish outreach programs throughout the country, which identifies affected families, pays secondary school fees directly to the partner schools, and supplies the necessary books, uniforms, and transportation to enable the children to attend school.

Foundation Rwanda also connects families to a range of psychological, social, and medical services provided by existing local partners.

In 2008, London's National Portrait Gallery recognized one of Torgovnik's photographs, awarding it first prize in its annual portrait competition.
