= Rodale Organic Gardening Experimental Farm =

- U.S. National Register of Historic Places
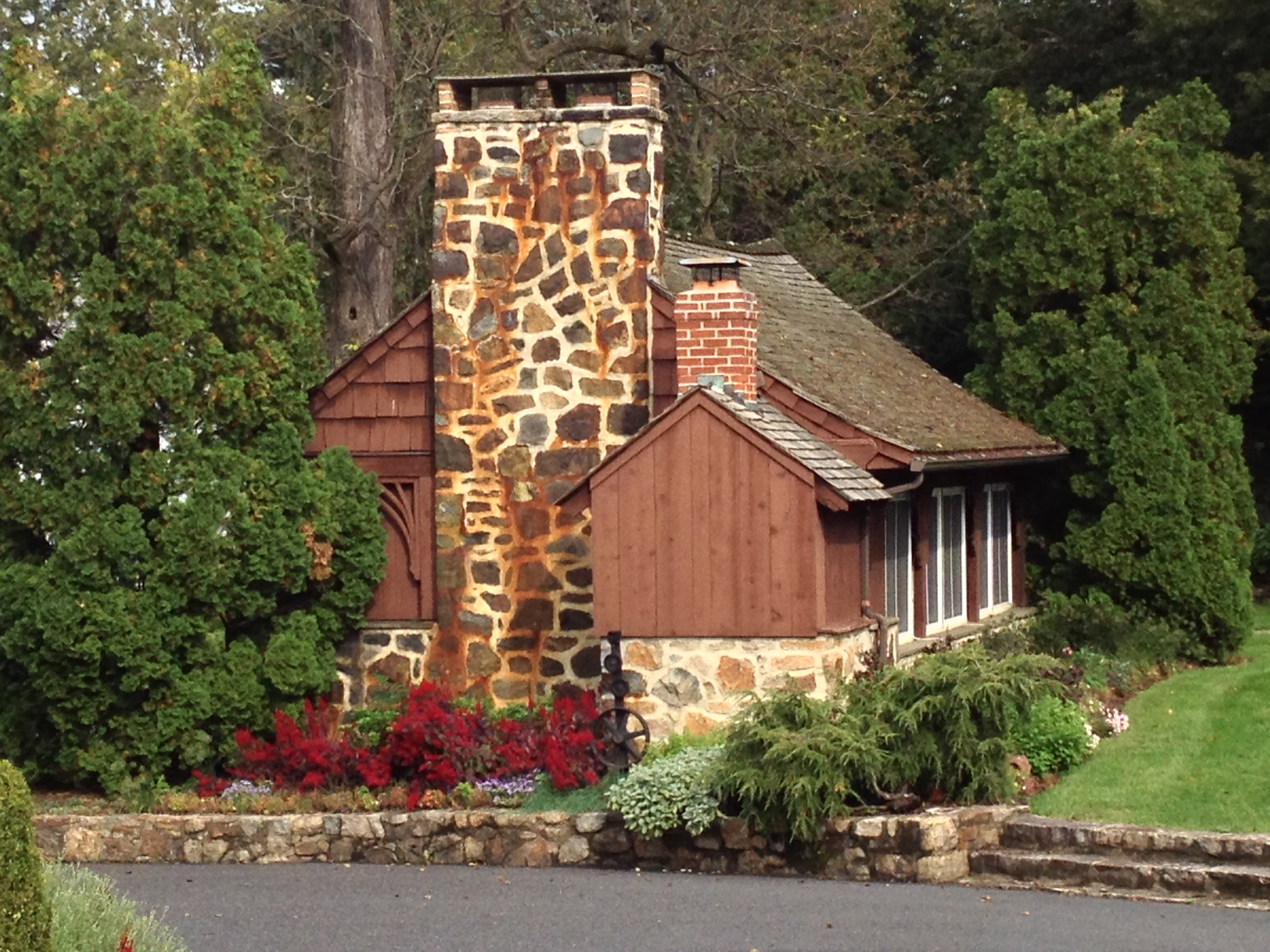
- Rodale Farm Clapboard and Stone Bakeoven in September 2012

- Location within Pennsylvania Location within the United States
- Location: 2056 Minesite Rd., Lower Macungie Township, Pennsylvania, U.S.
- Coordinates: 40°33′17″N 75°31′20″W
- Area: 39.2 acres (15.9 ha)
- Built: 1940
- Built by: J. I. Rodale
- Architectural style: Federal
- NRHP reference No.: 99000515
- Added to NRHP: May 12, 1999

Rodale Organic Gardening Experimental Farm, also known as the Working Tree Center, is a historic home and farm located in Lower Macungie Township, Pennsylvania. It is important in the history of organic gardening and farming in the 20th century.

The property was added to the National Register of Historic Places in 1999.

== History ==
=== 19th century ===
The home on the experimental farm's property is a farmhouse which dates to roughly the year 1830.

=== 20th century ===
The farm was altered by J. I. Rodale (1898-1971) in order to improve the quality of life at his residence and further his work during 1940 to 1971. Also added by Rodale were a farm office and greenhouse (circa 1945), turkey/goose coop, tennis court, cabana and pool, pavilion, and clapboard and fieldstone bake house, as well as five garden sites: the cultivated gardens, the stone gardens, the Sir Albert Howard test plots, and the aerobic and anaerobic compost heaps.

The farm is important in the history of organic gardening and farming in the 20th century. Other buildings and structures which pre-dated Rodale's 1940 purchase include: the Pennsylvania bank barn, implement shed, corn crib, and chicken coop.
