= Readly =

Swedish digital newspaper

Readly AB
- Company type: Public
- Traded as: Nasdaq Stockholm: READ
- Founded: 2012; 14 years ago
- Founder: Joel Wikell
- Key people: Philip Lindqvist (CEO)
- Parent: Cafeyn; Bonnier (Nordics)
- Website: readly.com

Readly AB is a Swedish digital newspaper and magazine subscription service with content from over 1200 third-party publishers, available via browser and mobile app for a monthly fee. It is part of Cafeyn, while the Nordics business is part of Bonnier Group.

== History ==
Readly was founded in 2012 by Joel Wikell.

Readly launched in the United Kingdom in 2014 and thereafter in Germany 2015, In 2016, Readly discontinued its eBook service.

In 2018, Readly expanded to the Netherlands, Italy 2019, and Australia and New Zealand in 2020.

In September 2020, Readly listed its shares on Nasdaq Stockholm Midcap.

In March 2021, Joel Wikell, the founder of Readly, left the board of directors. In November 2021, Readly acquired Toutabo SA, the French editor of the digital newsstand ePresse.

In May 2023, Philip Lindqvist was appointed as the new CEO.

In June 2025, Bonnier Group took their holdings in Readly to 96.45%. They had previously announced their intention to delist Readly and forcibly acquire the remaining 3.55% of shares for full ownership.

In April 2026, French company Cafeyn completed its acquisition and merger of Readly's business outside the Nordics.
