= Magzter =

Digital newspaper and magazine newsstand platform

Magzter Inc
- Type: Private
- Industry: Digital publishing
- Founded: 2011
- Founder: Girish Ramdas, Vijayakumar Radhakrishnan
- Headquarters: New York City, United States
- Area served: International
- Key people: Girish Ramdas (Co-Founder & CEO); Vijay Radhakrishnan (Co-founder and President)
- Number of employees: 80 (July 2022)
- Parent: VerSe Innovation
- Website: www.magzter.com

Magzter is a cross-platform, self-service, global digital newsstand with thousands of magazines and newspapers from 5,000+ publishers. Girish Ramdas and Vijayakumar Radhakrishnan founded Magzter in 2011. The company is headquartered in New York and since 2024, it is owned by VerSe Innovation.

== History ==
Girish Ramdas, the company's CEO, and Vijayakumar Radhakrishnan, the company's President, founded Magzter in 2011. In 2010, Radhakrishnan began the development of a platform to digitally publish magazines and the magazine store's app launch in mid-2011. In 2012, Magzter completed its Series A funding round. In September 2012, Magzter was listed as The Highest Grossing App in Asia on the Apple Store.

In July 2013, the firm entered into collaboration with Amazon's Kindle Fire and introduced books to their publishing platform in September 2013. The company also completed its Series B funding round that year, which raised $10 million. In early 2015, Magzter launched Magzter GOLD, a subscription, that provides unlimited access to over 9,000 magazines and newspapers from around the globe. The company also has Magzter GOLD Lite, that allows unlimited access to five titles.

On 18 April 2024, VerSe Innovation, the parent company of the Indian news aggregator app Dailyhunt, announced its acquisition of Magzter. While the financial terms were not disclosed, Umang Bedi, VerSe's co-founder, described the acquisition as VerSe’s largest to date, highlighting their focus on reaching affluent audiences.

== Business operations ==
Magzter distributes magazines and newspapers from several countries including the United States, the United Kingdom, Europe, China, Hong Kong, Canada, Australia, Sri Lanka, South Africa, Indonesia, India, Thailand, the Philippines, Malaysia, and Singapore. The company works with more than 5,000 publishers in more than 60 languages.

In July 2022, the company had 80 employees. The Magzter app is available on Apple iOS, Android (Google Play) and Amazon Appstore. The company counts among its publisher customers some marquee names including Dotdash Meredith (USA), Condé Nast (USA), Hearst (USA), A360 Media (USA), Bloomberg (USA), Maxim Inc. (USA), Guardian News & Media (UK), Future (UK), Reach Publishing Services Limited (UK), Media24 (South Africa), Tatler Asia (Singapore), India Today Group (India), Worldwide Media (India), HT Digital Streams Limited (India), SPH Media Limited (Singapore), Are Media (Australia) and Grupo Expansión (Mexico). Its headquarters are located in New York and sales offices and teams are in London, Mexico City, Amsterdam, Mumbai, New Delhi, Chennai, Bengaluru and Singapore.

== Business model ==
Magzter participates in a revenue share model with publishers on magazine and newspaper sales.
