= Robert Rodale =

American publisher

Bob Rodale
- Born: Robert David Rodale; March 27, 1930; New York City, New York, U.S.
- Died: September 20, 1990 (aged 60); Moscow, Soviet Union (present-day Russia)
- Known for: Organic gardening Valley Preferred Cycling Center
- Spouse: Ardath Harter (m. 1951)
- Children: 5, including Maria
- Parent(s): J. I. Rodale; Anna Andrews Rodale

Robert David Rodale (Cohen) (March 27, 1930 – September 20, 1990) was an American publisher who was president and chief executive officer of Rodale, Inc., a company founded in 1930 by his father J. I. Rodale in Emmaus, Pennsylvania.

Rodale was an adherent of organic farming, regenerative agriculture, and gardening and a publisher focused on health and wellness lifestyle magazines and books. Rodale was the founder of the Lehigh Valley Velodrome.

== Early life and education ==
Rodale was born in Manhattan, New York City, on March 27, 1930 to J. I. Rodale and Anna Andrews Rodale. The family moved to Emmaus, Pennsylvania shortly after Robert's birth when J. I. and his brother Joseph established an electrical manufacturing company there. He had two sisters, Nina and Ruth.

Robert learned the basics of farming and gardening while growing up on the family farm in Emmaus. He attended Lehigh University in Bethlehem, Pennsylvania from 1947 to 1951, studying English and journalism. In the 1970s, Robert Rodale played a major role in getting the Pennsylvania state government's attention through his Cornucopia Project, which stimulated the publication of state-level analyses of how readily local demand could be met by local supply. At a time of increasing energy prices, a new emphasis on eating local became his platform for a more sustainable way of engaging with his community.

== Career ==
Robert joined his father at Rodale Press in 1951 as an editor. His first assignment was to read galley proofs for The Organic Farmer, a precursor to Organic Gardening and New Farm magazines. He worked alongside his father as president of Rodale Press until his father's death in 1971 during a television interview with Dick Cavett. Robert was the U.S. representative at the November 5, 1972 founding of the International Federation of Organic Agriculture Movements (now IFOAM-Organics International) in Versailles, France.

Rodale was named chairman of the board and chief executive officer of Rodale Press, which grew to exceed $200 million in revenue under his management.

== Sports ==
Rodale competed in the 1968 Olympics in skeet shooting and was inducted into the United States Bicycling Hall of Fame in 1991.

== Personal life ==
Rodale met his wife, Ardath Harter, at a square dance party held at her family home. His father "suggested" her as a wife for Robert after dancing with her himself. Robert and Ardath married in June 1951 after a short courtship. The couple had five children, several of whom became involved in the family-run Rodale Press and Rodale Institute.

== Death ==
On September 20, 1990, Rodale was killed in an auto accident in Moscow while in the Soviet Union to establish a Russian language edition of The New Farmer, one of several Rodale Press publications devoted to chemical-free farming. Yevgeni Gringaut, the Russian publisher of the magazine, and Rodale's interpreter were also killed in the crash. The three were driving to Moscow Airport when their van was hit head-on by a swerving bus. Rodale's wife Ardath died in 2009 at 81.

== Publications ==
- Rodale, Robert (September 1972). Sane Living in a Mad World: A Guide to the Organic Way of Life (1st ed.). Rodale Press. ISBN 0878570101.
