= The Rodale Institute =

Nonprofit organic farming research institute

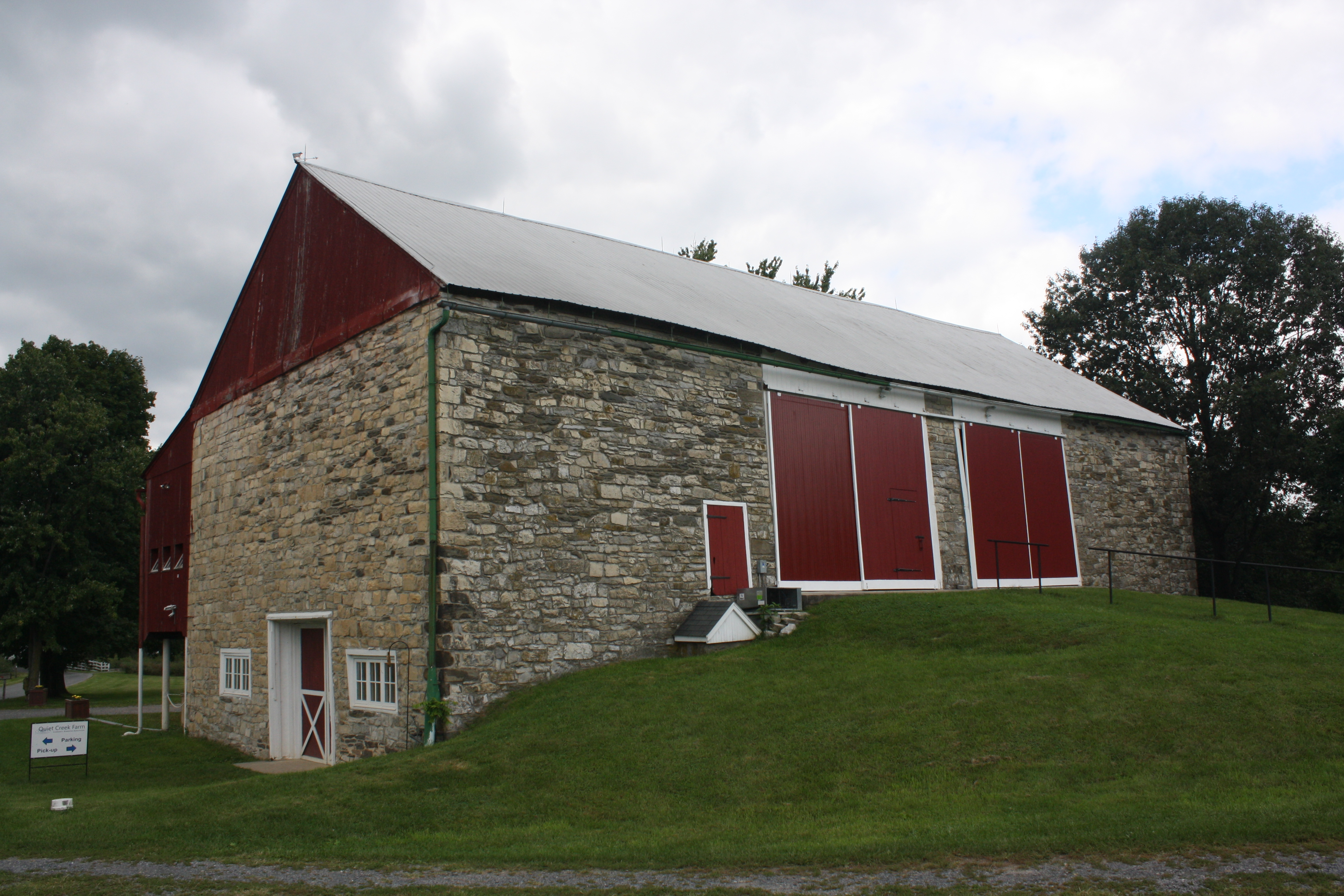
The Henry Siegfried Barn at the Rodale Institute in Kutztown, Pennsylvania in September 2013

Rodale Institute is a non-profit organization that supports research into organic farming. It was founded in Emmaus, Pennsylvania, in 1947 by J. I. Rodale, an organic living entrepreneur. After J.I. Rodale died in 1971, his son Robert Rodale purchased 333 acres and moved the farm to Kutztown, Pennsylvania.

Rodale Institute uses a long-term, side-by-side research trial model to compare organic and conventional agriculture. Its longest running experiment, the Farming Systems Trial, has been running since 1981 and compares organic and conventional corn, soybeans, and other grains. The institute also researches the effects of growing food without chemical pesticides, herbicides and fertilizers on human health, water quality, climate change, and more.

Collaborations with farmers and agricultural science peers throughout the nation and world enable institute researchers to replicate experiments across different geographical regions and benefit farmers with opportunities to test new approaches to organic production. The institute allies with national and state-level organic certification programs, industry leaders and elected officials to help shape policy. The institute also partners strategically with U.S. and foreign government entities, businesses, and organizations to promote regenerative organic farming opportunities and to expand the benefits of organic agriculture to more people.

== History ==
Starting in 1942, Rodale began publishing his views and practical advice in his startup magazine, Organic Farming and Gardening. In the magazine, he avidly promoted a holistic, whole-systems approach to agriculture. After J.I. Rodale died in 1971, his son Robert Rodale expanded his father's agriculture and health-related pursuits with the purchase of a farm east of Kutztown, Pennsylvania. At the Kutztown site, Rodale and his wife Ardath established what is now known as The Rodale Institute to begin an era of regenerative, organic farm-scale research. The Kutztown site was listed on the National Register of Historic Places. It is also known as the Siegfried's Dale Farm.

Rodale proposed the concept of regeneration to argue that any natural system, properly managed, could be productive while increasing its capacity into the future. He wrote that regenerative organic farming can use its own internal resources to improve soil fertility and productivity over time, rather than relying on expensive—and potentially environmentally damaging—outside chemical inputs.

Bob Rodale died in a 1990 automobile accident in Moscow while launching a Russian edition of Rodale's New Farm magazine. John Haberern, who had been hired by Robert Rodale as a Rodale Press book editor in 1961, took over as president of the institute. Ardath Rodale became the institute's chairman. Anthony Rodale, son of Ardath and Bob, became vice-chairman. Anthony and his wife, Florence, developed outreach efforts for children during the couple's period of active program involvement before Anthony became an international ambassador for the institute. Board member Paul McGinley became co-chair of the board with Ardath in 2005. Testimony by Bob Rodale, John Haberern, and farmers and agricultural scientists helped convince the U.S. Congress to fund sustainable agriculture, which was initially called "Low-Input Sustainable Agriculture", in the 1985 Farm Bill.

This validation of an agroecological approach to farming led to the formation of the USDA's Sustainable Agriculture Research and Education (SARE) program in 1990. Federal, state, and local governments, and land-grant universities and other organizations nationally are pursuing sustainable and organic agriculture research and education programs.

J.I. Rodale's great-granddaughter Maya Rodale serves as co-chairman of the Rodale Institute's board of directors along with Whole Foods general counsel Roberta Lang.

== Programs ==
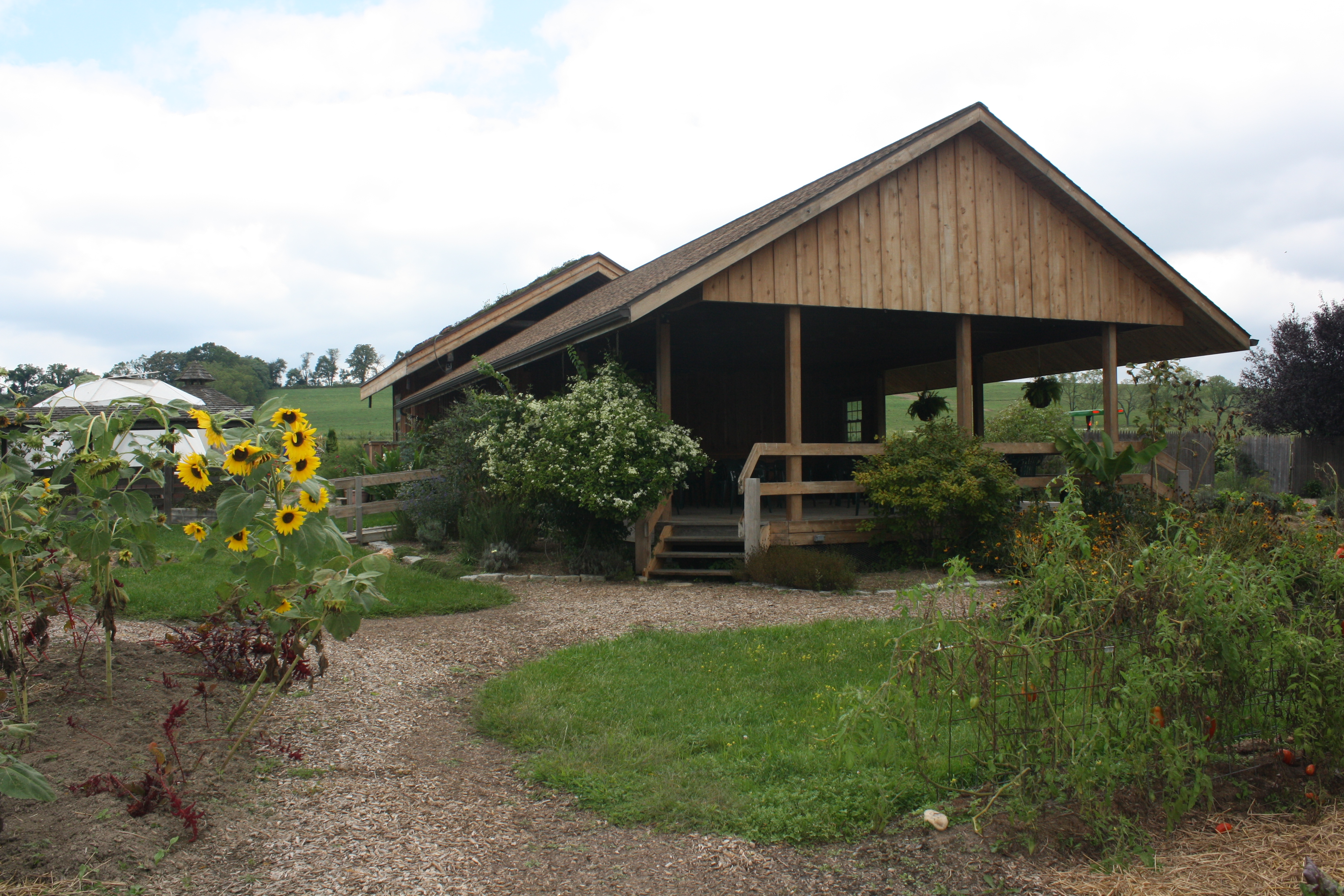
A test garden at the Rodale Institute in September 2013

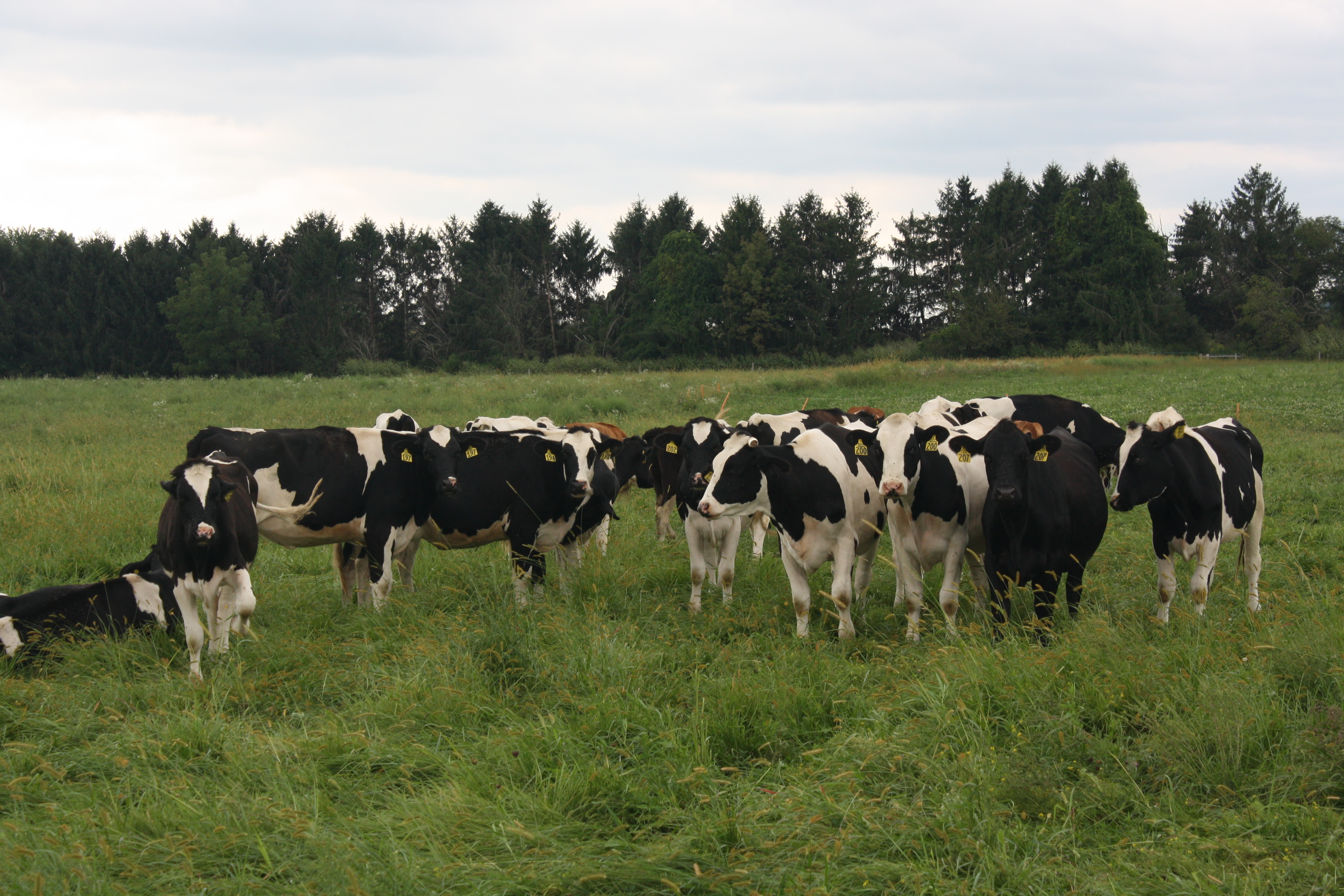
Cows at the Rodale Institute in September 2013

The Rodale Institute conducts research that seeks to improve the viability, productivity and documented ecological services of organic farming using current agricultural technologies and practices.

Focusing on agronomic and some horticultural cropping systems, research trials examine organic and conventional practices, chemical-free weed-management techniques, weed- and disease-resistant crop varieties, compost management and application, soil health, no-till organic planting systems using cover crops and optimal cover-crop uses in organic crop rotations.

Part of the Rodale Institute's research has been the ongoing Farming Systems Trial (FST). Begun in 1981, the FST compares two organic farming systems—manure-based and legume-based approaches—to conventional farming methods, defined as methods using Cooperative Extension-prescribed chemical and tillage inputs.

FST found that after fields undergo a multi-year transition period to restore biological activity, organic yields are comparable to those of conventional systems. Additionally, organic yields exceed those of conventional systems in years of drought and other stress. Furthermore, organic systems have the capacity to sequester significant amounts of carbon.

Current experiments also pursue improvements in no-tillage and minimum tillage systems with the use of Rodale's "no-till roller/crimper" device created by Jeff Moyer. The device simultaneously rolls and crimps a cover crop, forming a mulch layer into which a cash crop can be planted in the same pass with a special no-till planter.

No-till systems with cover crops can contribute to carbon sequestration by adding to and preserving organic matter (57% carbon by weight) in the soil, an important component of the institute's goal to link organic agriculture with the campaign to mitigate global warming.

Other experiments focus on biological pest controls, the use of mychorrhizal fungi – hosted by root systems in a symbiotic relationship – to amplify crops' abilities to uptake nutrients, and time-sensitive planting to avoid insect cycles and maximize the use of growing degree day(s).

== Locations ==
Rodale Institute has 8 locations, including four Regional Resource Centers, satellite campuses in which research into regenerative organic agriculture can be conducted at scale in different climates, soil types, and communities.

- Rodale Institute's headquarters is located in Kutztown, Pennsylvania and hosts the main offices and research trials for the institute. The farm is 386 acres, and its buildings have been listed on the National Register of Historic Places.
- The Rodale Institute Southeast Organic Center is located on Many Fold Farm in Chattahoochee Hills, Georgia. This location is partnered with Serenbe wellness community.
- The Rodale Institute California Organic Center is located in Camarillo, California. This Regional Resource Center is located on the McGrath Family Farm, a fifth-generation farm that has been in operation since 1868.
- In partnership with Frontier Co-op, the Rodale Institute Midwest Organic Center is located in Marion, Iowa. This location is also the hub of Rodale Institute's Midwest consulting arm.
- Rodale Institute's first international Regional Resource Center, The Davines Group-Rodale Institute European Regenerative Organic Center, is located on the Davines international headquarters in Parma, Italy. This center was created in partnership with haircare brand Davines.
- Rodale Institute Pacific Northwest Organic Center at Cascadian Farm, the original home farm of Cascadian Farm (now a General Mills brand) along the Skagit River in Washington State, transferred to Rodale in 2022.
