= Rodale, Inc. =

Defunct American corporation

- Status: Defunct, 2017
- Founded: 1930
- Founder: J. I. Rodale
- Successor: Hearst (magazines); Crown Publishing Group (books)
- Country of origin: United States
- Headquarters location: Emmaus, Pennsylvania, U.S.
- Publication types: Magazines, books
- Official website: rodale.com

Rodale, Inc. (/ˈroʊdeɪl/), was an American publisher of health and wellness magazines, books, and digital properties headquartered in Emmaus, Pennsylvania, with a satellite office in New York City. The company was founded in 1930. In 2017, it was acquired by New York City-based Hearst Communications, a media conglomerate.

The company launched and published health and wellness lifestyle magazines, including Men's Health and Prevention, and books, including the bestsellers An Inconvenient Truth by Al Gore and Eat This, Not That by health writer David Zinczenko.

== History ==
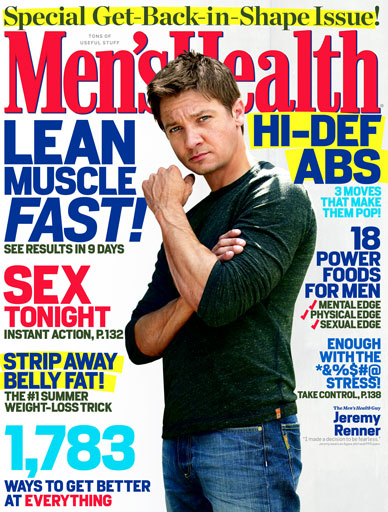
Men's Health magazine, published by Rodale since 1986, has a monthly global circulation of 1.8 million in 59 countries.

Rodale Inc. was founded in 1930 by J. I. Rodale. He was a partner with his brother, Joseph, in Rodale Manufacturing, which produced electrical switches. Joseph moved Rodale Manufacturing to Emmaus, Pennsylvania to take advantage of favorable local taxes, while J. I. dabbled in publishing. In 1942, Rodale started Organic Farming and Gardening magazine. Organic Gardening became the best-read gardening magazine in the world., but in 2015, it was transformed into Rodale’s Organic Life, a new “lifestyle” magazine covering cooking, house and home, style, and gardening. In 1950, Rodale introduced Prevention, a health magazine.

In 1971, J. I. Rodale died during a taping of The Dick Cavett Show, and his son, Robert Rodale (1930–1990), took over the company’s leadership. On September 20, 1990, Robert Rodale was killed in a car accident during a business trip in Russia.

In 1972, Rodale Press was one of the five founding members of the International Federation of Organic Agriculture Movements (IFOAM) (now IFOAM–Organics International), founded at Versailles, France.

Following Robert Rodale's death, his wife, Ardath Harter Rodale (1928–2009), became chairman and chief executive officer of the company. In 2000, Steven Pleshette Murphy joined the company as president and chief operating officer, and was named president and CEO in 2002. On June 18, 2007, Ardath Rodale stepped down as chairman, and her daughter, Maria, was named chairman. Ardath remained a member of the company’s board and took over the new title of Chief Inspiration Officer. On September 1, 2009, Murphy stepped down as President and CEO. Maria Rodale, granddaughter of company founder J.I. Rodale and daughter of previous chairpersons Robert Rodale and Ardath Rodale, succeeded Murphy as CEO.

=== Sale to Hearst ===
In October 2017, New York City–based Hearst Communications announced it would acquire the magazine and book businesses of Rodale. The transaction was expected to close in January following government approvals. Rodale announced some months prior that it would consider a total sale of the company, among other alternatives explored by its board of directors. It hired financial adviser Allen & Co. to lead the search for bidders. According to a source familiar with the negotiations, Hearst outbid Meredith Corporation, another large media company that had expressed interest in Rodale’s portfolio, almost immediately after they solicited offers.

After the sale, Hearst sold Rodale's trade publishing division to Crown Publishing Group, a subsidiary of Penguin Random House.

== Imprints ==
In 2007, Rodale launched Modern Times, an imprint focused on non-fiction, politics, current affairs, and biographical books headed by Leigh Haber, previously of Hyperion. Modern Times was discontinued in 2008.

Rodale Kids, a children's imprint, was launched in 2017, and was absorbed into Random House Children's Books in the 2018 sale.

== Products ==
=== Magazines ===
- Bicycling
- The Bike Mag
- Men's Health
- Rodale's Organic Life
- Prevention
- Runner's World
- Women's Health

=== Books ===
- Agatston, Arthur (2003). The South Beach Diet.
- Gore, Al (2006). An Inconvenient Truth.
- Gore, Al (2009). Our Choice.
- Gore, Al (2017). An Inconvenient Sequel: Truth to Power.
- Hammond, Darell (2011). Kaboom! How One Man Built a Movement to Save Play.
- Kidder, David S. (2006). The Intellectual Devotional.
- Kurzweil, Ray; Grossman, Terry (2004). Fantastic Voyage: Live Long Enough to Live Forever.
- Maher, Bill (2005). New Rules: Polite Musings from a Timid Observer.
- Rose, Pete (2004). My Prison Without Bars.
- Zinczenko, David; Goulding, Matt (2007). Eat This, Not That!.
- Feder, RD David (2010). The Skinny Carbs Diet: Eat Pasta, Potatoes, and More! Use the power of resistant starch to make your favorite foods fight fat and beat cravings!.

== News website ==
Rodale News' website was launched on Earth Day, April 22, 2009, with the tagline “where health meets green".

== See also ==
- Rodale Institute
