= Cycling in the Netherlands =

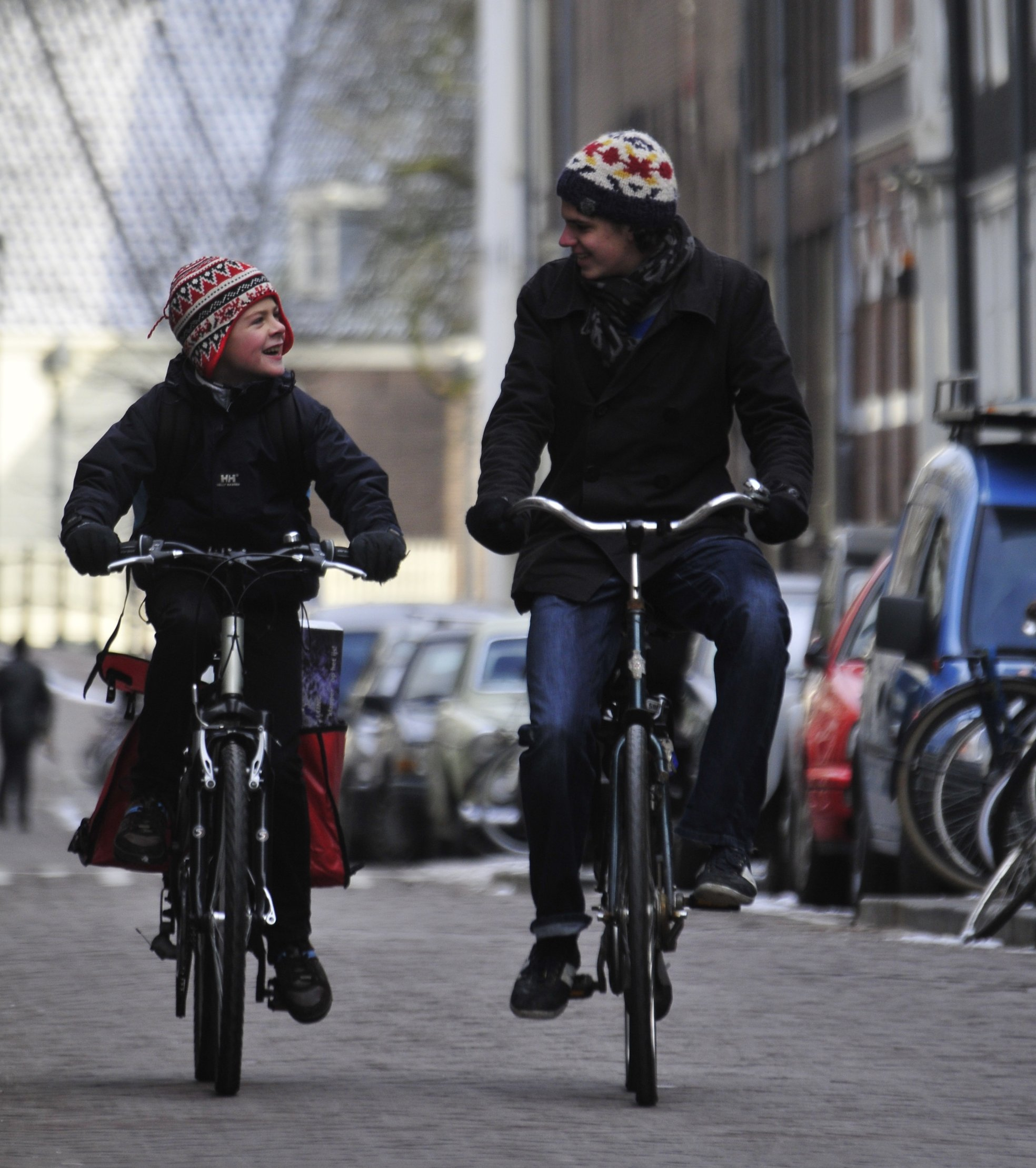
Everyday cycling in the Netherlands (Amsterdam)

Cycling is the second-most common mode of transport in the Netherlands, with 36% of Dutch people listing the bicycle as their most frequent way of getting around on a typical day, (Note: Up from 31% naming the bike their main mode of transport for daily activities in 2011.) as opposed to the car (45%) and public transport (11%). Cycling has a modal share of 27% of all trips (urban and rural) nationwide. In cities this is even higher, such as Amsterdam which has 38%, and Zwolle 46%. This high frequency of bicycle travel is enabled by excellent cycling infrastructure such as cycle paths, cycle tracks, protected intersections, ample bicycle parking and by making cycling routes shorter and more direct (and therefore usually quicker) than car routes.

In the countryside, an increasing number of routes link the Netherlands' villages, towns, and cities. Some of these paths are part of the Dutch National Cycle Network, a well-established system of specially designed routes for bicycle tourism that reaches every corner of the nation, or the newer numbered-node cycle network signage system which facilitates more personalised touring routes.

== History ==
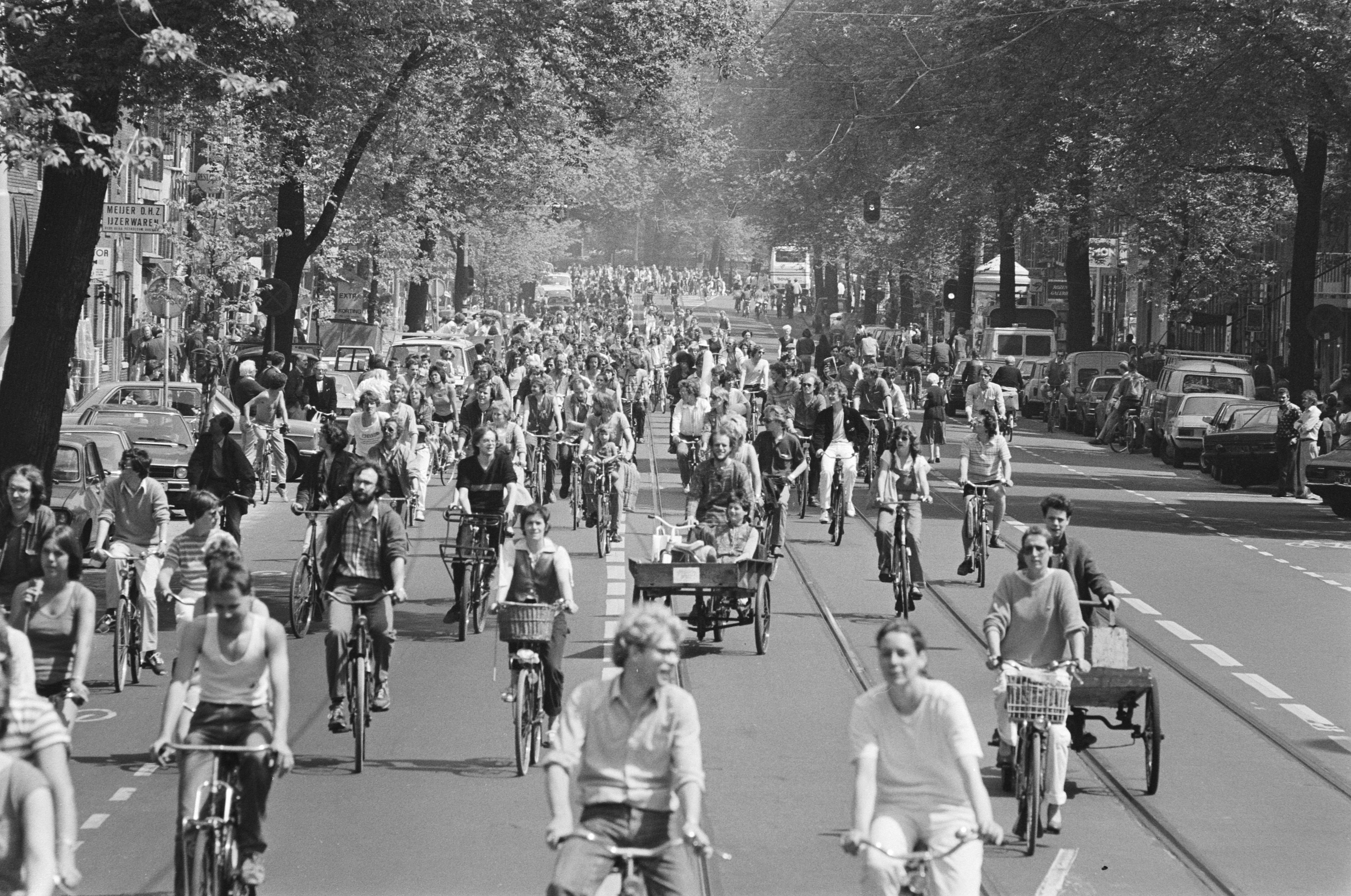
Amsterdam, 1982. Demonstration against 'car terror'

Cycling became popular in the Netherlands a little later than it did in the United States and Britain, which experienced their bike booms in the 1880s, but by the 1890s the Dutch were already building dedicated paths for cyclists. By 1911, the Dutch owned more bicycles per capita than any other country in Europe.

The ownership and use of bicycles continued to increase and in 1940 there were around four million bicycles in a population of eight million. Half of these bicycles disappeared during the German occupation, but after the war the use of bicycles quickly returned to normal and continued at a high level until 1960 (annual distance covered by bicycle for each inhabitant: 1500 km; 1000 miles). Then, much like it had in other developed nations, the privately owned motor car became more affordable and therefore more commonly in use and bicycles as a result less popular. That is: ownership still remained high, but use fell to around 800 km (500 miles) annually. Even so, the number of Dutch people cycling was very high compared to other European nations.

The trend away from the bicycle and towards motorised transport only began to decrease in the 1970s when Dutch people took to the streets to protest against the high number of child deaths on the roads: in some years over 500 children were killed in collisions with motor vehicles. This protest movement, initiated by Maartje van Putten (later a MEP), was known as the Stop de Kindermoord ("Stop the Child Murder"). The success of this movement—along with other factors, such as the oil shortages of 1973–74 and the publication of the CROW Design Manual for Bicycle Traffic—turned government policy around. The country began to restrict urban motor vehicle use and direct its focus on growth towards other forms of transport, with the bicycle perceived as critical in making streets safer and towns and cities more people-friendly and livable.

== Overview ==
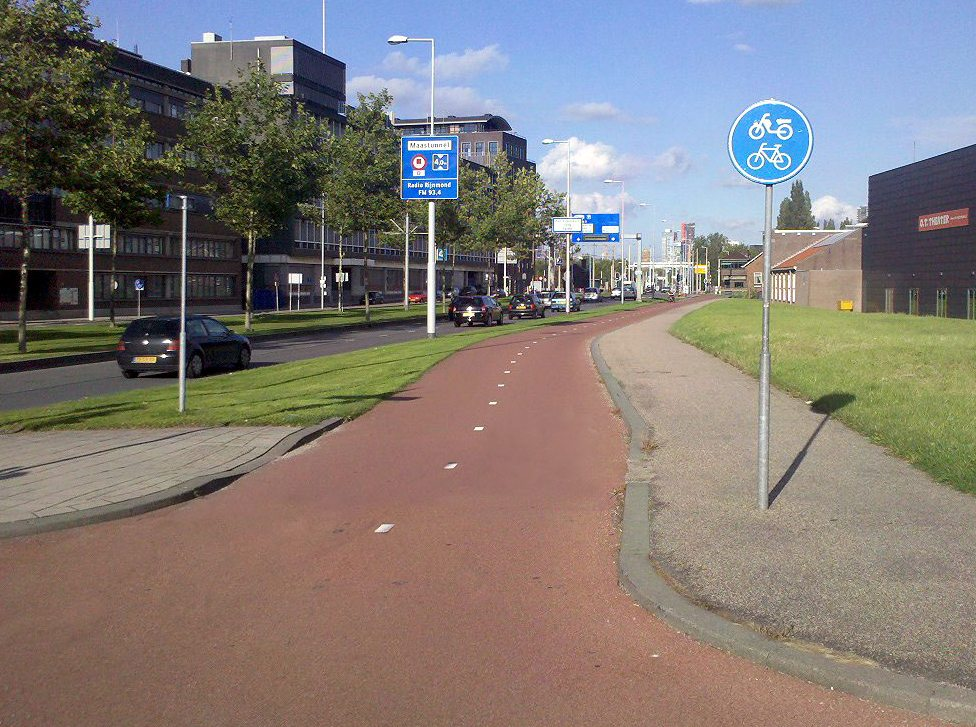
A typical Dutch bike path, Rotterdam

Besides the history and social movements, there is no single reason as to why cycling remains so popular in the Netherlands: many bicycle friendly factors reinforce each other:

- Geography, built environment and weather
  - The Netherlands is a relatively densely populated and very flat country, which means that journey distances tend to be short, even between towns. (It can be very windy though.)
  - The cool climate of the Netherlands means that one can cycle very short distances without breaking into a sweat. This means that people can cycle to work or school without having to shower or wash straight afterwards, as they more often might have to do in warm, hot or humid climates.
    - Though likewise, chilly and cold weather may not be considered pleasant to cycle in compared to other cities
- Bike-friendly infrastructure
  - There is a continuous network of cycle paths, clearly signposted, well maintained and well lit, with road/cycle path junctions that often give priority to cyclists. This makes cycling itself convenient, pleasant, and safe.
  - There is also a good network of bicycle shops throughout the country.
- Bike-friendly public policy, planning and laws
  - The needs of cyclists are taken into account in all stages of urban planning. Urban areas are frequently organised as woonerven (living streets), which prioritise cyclists and pedestrians over motorised traffic.
  - The Netherlands employs a standards-based approach to road design, where conflicts between different modes of transport are eliminated wherever possible and reduced in severity as much as possible where elimination is not possible. The result of this is that cycling is made both objectively and subjectively safe. Towns have been designed with limited access by cars and limited (decreasing over time) car parking. The resulting heavy traffic and very limited car parking makes car use unattractive in towns.
  - A form of strict liability has been law in the Netherlands since the early 1990s for bicycle-motor vehicle accidents. In a nutshell this means that, in a collision between a car and a cyclist, the driver's insurer is deemed to be liable to pay damages (n.b. motor vehicle insurance is mandatory in the Netherlands, while cyclist insurance is not) to the cyclist's property and their medical bills as long as 1) the cyclist did not intentionally crash into the motor vehicle, and 2) the cyclist was not in error in some way. If the cyclist was in error, as long as the collision was still unintentional, the motorist's insurance must still pay half of the damages—though this does not apply if the cyclist is under 14 years of age, in which case the motorist must pay full damages. If it can be proved that a cyclist intended to collide with the car, then the cyclist must pay the damages (or their parents in the case of a minor).
  - No compulsory bicycle helmet laws. In the Netherlands, bicycle helmets are not commonly worn; they are mostly used by young children and the extremely few road cyclists and mountain bikers there who ride road bikes or mountain bikes. In fact, the Dutch Fietsersbond (Cyclists' Union) summarized existing evidence and concluded that, for normal, slow, everyday cycling a compulsory helmet law would have a negative impact on population health.
- Cycling and environmental sustainability
  - Through higher use of bikes and lower usage of cars and public transportation, the Dutch lower their ecological footprint and help the environment.
  - Bike usage significantly lowers fossil fuel consumption and energy per capita use, leading to less pollution and other environmental damage.
- Cycling culture
  - Cycling is a symbol of Dutch culture. It has been considered a national symbol since 1920 and a very patriotic means of transportation since 1938.
  - Bicycling is presented in Dutch qualities and civil virtues of independence, self-control, modesty and stability.
  - Cycling has had a positive effect on tourism—people visit the Netherlands to experience its specific cycling culture.
- Health effects and the economics of cycling
  - Cycling prevents about 6500 deaths each year, and Dutch people have half-a-year-longer life expectancy because of cycling.
  - The health benefits correspond to more than 3% of the Dutch gross domestic product.
  - It is confirmed that investments made in bicycle-promoting policies (e.g., improved bicycle infrastructure and facilities) will likely yield a high benefit-cost ratio in the long term.
- Very slow bicycles and equipment
  - The long-standing bike culture has meant that most bicycles are slow, heavy utility bicycles rather than road and mountain bikes (though all types of bikes are to be seen, from road bikes, to recumbents, right through to velomobiles, though they are extremely rare—ridden by less than 1% of the Dutch population). The Dutch mainly choose to ride roadster bicycles, like the ubiquitous Omafiets, which are practical (for the Netherlands, due to its almost complete lack of hills and urban sprawl), low-maintenance and suited to load carrying, with mudguards and skirt-guards, and where the rider is seated in an up-right position, making for a comfortable (for very short distances of no more than 3–4 miles), very slow (between 8 and 15 mph), leisurely ride on flat terrain.
  - Bicycle baskets, panniers and load-carrying trailers are common for carrying items to school or work or for carrying shopping items back home from the shops.
- Training
  - The Dutch train their children to ride so they can confidently ride in the roads when they are around 12 years of age, just before they start secondary school. Only if they pass their traffic exam are they awarded their Verkeersdiploma (traffic certificate). This training is deemed necessary as 75% of secondary school students cycle to school, rising to 84% riding for those living within 5 km (3 miles) of school. Even for distances of 16 km (10 mi) or over, some 8% of secondary school children cycle in each direction to school, though this is mainly in rural areas where the closest secondary schools can be a fair distance away. (Some 49% of primary school children ride to school, but distances are shorter and adults often accompany the younger ones.)
  - Dutch motorists are also trained for interaction with cyclists as part of their driver training when going for their driving licence. For example, trainee motorists are trained to check and re-check their right-hand side for cyclists before making a turn to the right.

These factors together far outweigh the negative factors of wet and windy weather, strong winds due to the flat terrain, and frequent bicycle thefts. Over a quarter of all journeys made in the Netherlands are by bicycle. Even the over 65 age group make nearly a quarter of their journeys by bicycle—though, among this age group, electric bikes are very popular. In some cities over half of all journeys are made by bicycle.

By 2012 cycling had grown tremendously in popularity. In Amsterdam alone, 490,000 cyclists took to the road to cycle 2 million kilometres (1 million miles) every day, according to its city council statistics. This has caused some problems as, despite 35,000 kilometres (22,000 miles) of bicycle paths, the country's 18 million bicycles (1.3 per citizen old enough to ride) sometimes clog Dutch cities' busiest streets. This is being addressed by building even more bike lanes to tackle a problem many other cities in the world would envy—that of bicycle traffic congestion. The Netherlands' busiest cycleway, Vredenburg in the city of Utrecht, sees some 32,000 cyclists on an average weekday, and up to 37,000 on peak days, rivalling the numbers claimed for the busiest cycleway in the world in Copenhagen, Denmark.

In 2011 cycling advocate David Hembrow argued that the Dutch make more cycle journeys between them than the American, British and Australian people added together, and with greater safety than cyclists in any of those countries.

In 2012, the Dutch Fietsersbond (Cyclists' Union) said that a quarter of all deadly crashes in the Netherlands involve cyclists. Research in 2013 showed that 60% of fatal cycling accidents took place at junctions and in two out of five of those accidents, cyclists were not given priority by the driver. From 2007 to 2012, the number of fatal accidents decreased in the Netherlands from 850 to 600, while the number of cycling fatalities remained roughly constant. In 2015, cycling deaths made up 30% of road deaths in the Netherlands, 185 out of 621.

== Infrastructure ==
Many roads have one or two separate cycleways alongside them, or cycle lanes marked on the road. On roads where adjacent bike paths or cycle tracks exist, the use of these facilities is compulsory, and cycling on the main carriageway is not permitted. Some 35,000 km (22,000 miles) of cycle-track has been physically segregated from motor traffic, equal to a quarter of the country's entire 140,000 km road network. On other roads and streets, bicycle and motor vehicles share the same road-space, but these are usually roads with a low speed limit. The surface quality of these bike lanes are good and the routing tends to be direct with gentle turns making it possible to cycle at good speeds for considerable distances. Cycleways come with their own sets of rules and systems—including traffic signals/lights, tunnels and lanes.

Tunnels and bridges may or may not be accessible for cycling; if pedal cycles are prohibited, there is usually a separate facility. For example, the Western Scheldt Tunnel is not accessible for pedestrians, cyclists or moped riders. They have to use the ferry at another location, or take the bus through the tunnel. Unlike the vast majority of bus services in the Netherlands, three services that cross this tunnel carry bicycles and mopeds. There is a fee for this service and reservation is recommended.

Pedestrians use the pavement where one is available, otherwise they use the same position on the road as the cyclists: on the cycleway or lane if available, otherwise on the road (but in the latter case pedestrians preferably walk on the left, while cyclists go on the right). Roads and tunnels accessible for cyclists are also accessible for pedestrians. Most pedestrian paths are available to cyclists who dismount and walk the bike.

=== Separate bike paths, parallel to the roadway ===
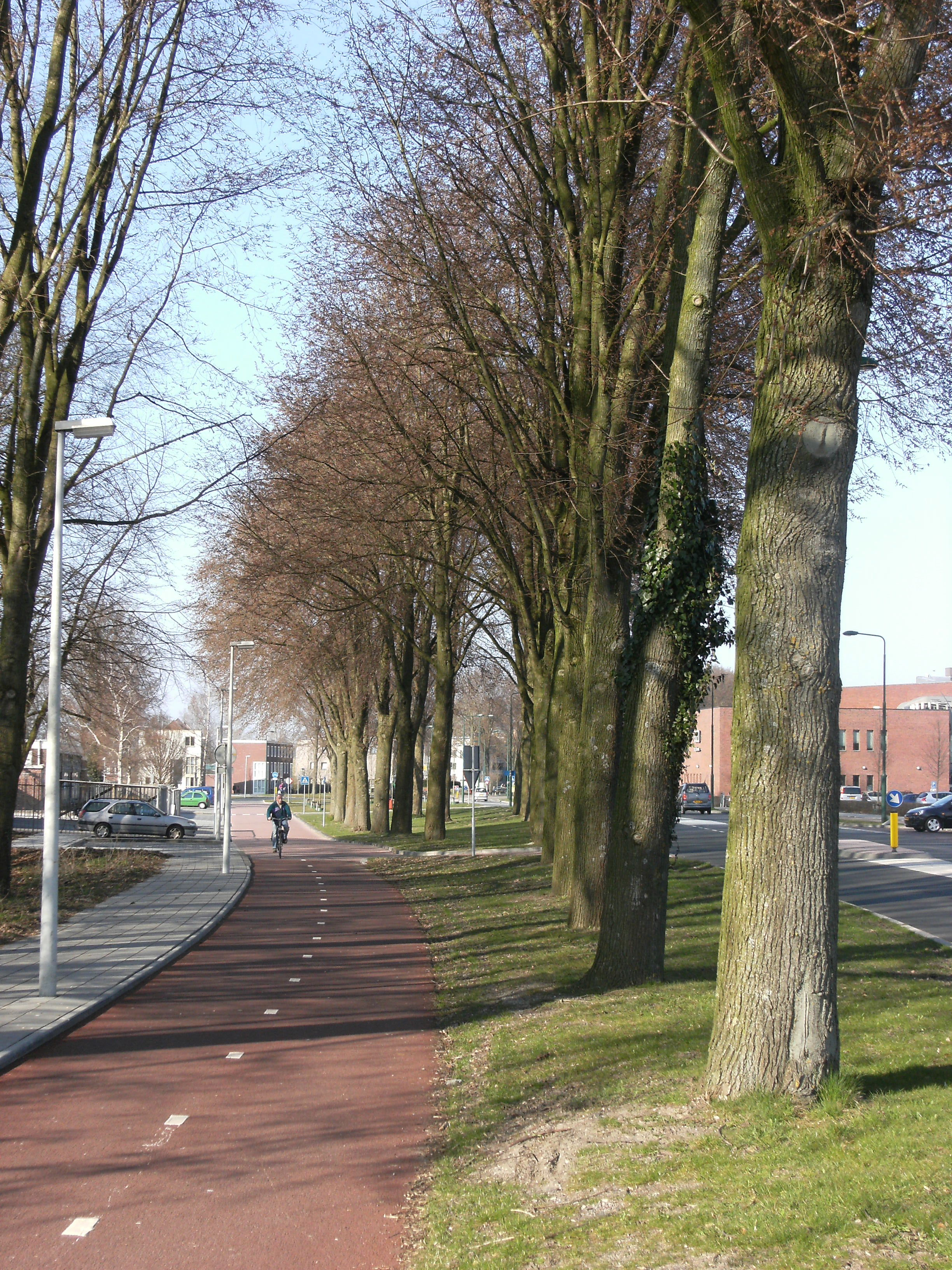
A typical bi-directional cycle path design (middle, in red), a roadway on the right with a green verge in between. There is a footpath (in grey) to the bike path's left.

When enough space is available, larger roads are fitted with a parallel fietspad (bike path) that is physically separated—for example by means of a verge, hedge, or parking lane—from the roadway. In most cases, these bike paths are also physically separated from an adjacent footpath.

Where protected bike paths exist, their use is in most cases obligatory for cyclists. Mopeds, mofas and the like are allowed and obliged to use them when their maximum speed is no more than 25 km/h (15 mph) (with a blue license plate) (though this has become controversial). When the maximum speed is 45 km/h (30 mph) (yellow license plate), mopeds are only allowed to use the cycle paths if that is indicated (mostly outside of the built-up area). Motorists are not allowed on bike paths, and to enforce this the entry of cars is often made physically impossible by using obstacles. In any case, a single-directional bike path is usually too narrow for cars to travel on.

Bi-directional bike paths on one side of the road are common in towns as well as in the countryside: they are divided into two lanes, similar to roads, by a dashed line. Occasionally bi-directional cycle ways exist on both sides of the road; this reduces the number of times cyclists have to cross the road.

The colour of the pavement on a bike lane or path may vary, though red is the standard colour to identify bike paths and on-road bike lanes in the Netherlands: either red asphalt or brickwork is used to visually distinguish cycle ways from car lanes and footpaths. Standard black asphalt is also commonly used and some older cycle paths are made of the square tiles commonly used for sidewalks.

=== On-road bike lanes ===
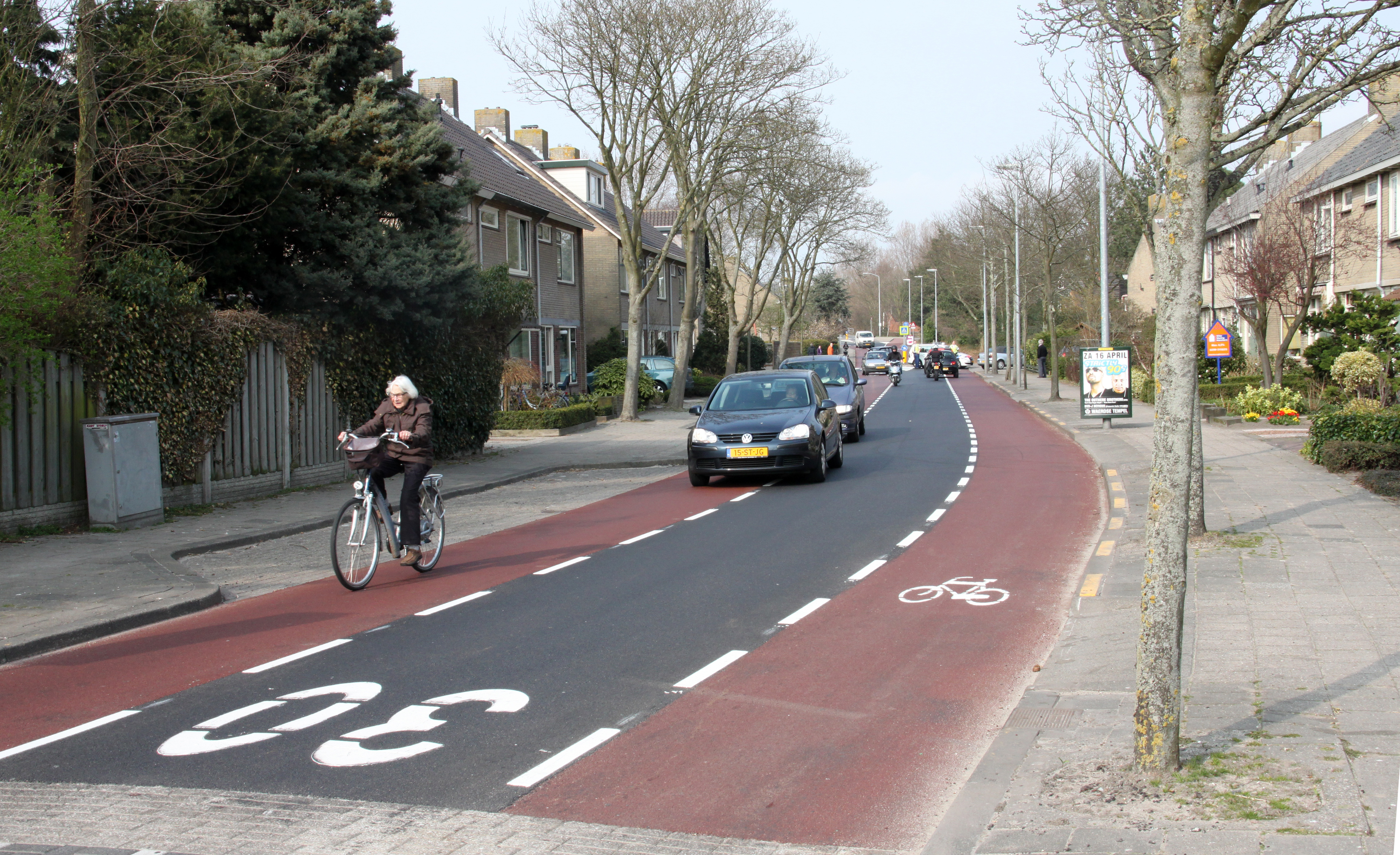
Fietsstrook type cycle lanes (red) that may be used by motorists as well when other cars approach from the opposite direction. The cars must use them safely, however, and not crowd out the cyclists.

On-road bike lanes in the Netherlands are marked by either a dashed line or a solid line: lanes marked by a dashed line may be used by motorists provided that they do not impede cyclists, while those marked with a solid line may not be used by motorists. Solid lines are interrupted on crossings to allow motorists to enter or leave the road. Car parking is never allowed in either type of lane.

Bike lanes are usually surfaced with red or black asphalt. The red colour has no legal meaning, it is there for visibility; the on-road bike lane is delineated by the solid or dashed line by which it is separated from the roadway.

National guidelines advise a minimum width of 1.25 metres (4 feet) for cycle lanes.

When a cycle lane is present on a road, cyclists are obliged to use it. Since 15 December 1999 mopeds are not allowed on cycle lanes.

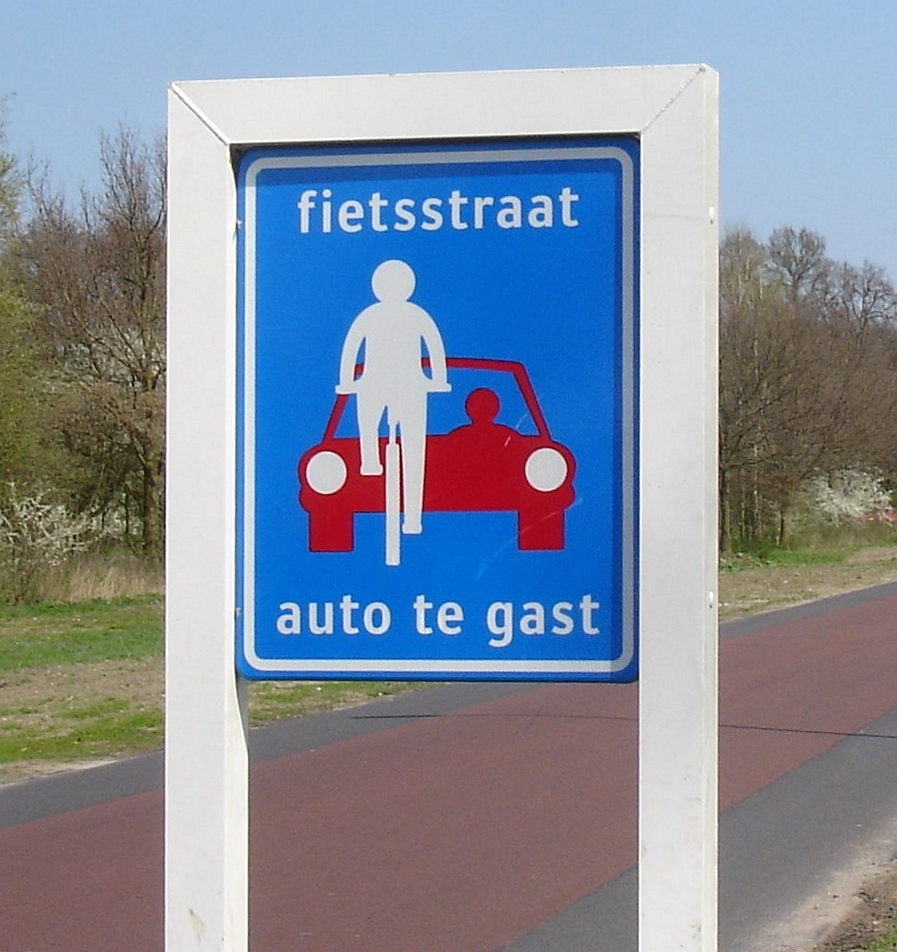
"Fietsstraat" road signs indicate priority for cyclists.

=== Fietsstraat (cycle street) ===
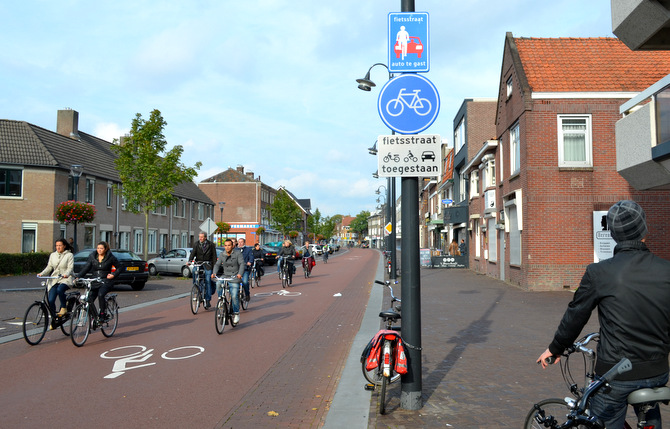
A fietsstraat (cycle street) where bicycles are the main form of transport and cars are considered "guests".

A fietsstraat (cycle street) is a road where bicycles are considered to be the primary and preferred form of transport and where cars and other motorised vehicles are allowed "as guests". Designs vary, but most examples incorporate red asphalt and have a speed limit of 30 km/h (20 mph).

Fietsstraat streets exist mostly in residential areas where low-traffic roads exist anyway. A fietsstraat was in most cases originally a road that had low-traffic volumes beforehand and was therefore easily converted. They are an important type of infrastructure which makes Dutch towns and cities safer for cyclists. They can also be used for route separation to enable cyclists to avoid busier roads and have direct routes into and through towns.

=== Separation of traffic routes by mode ===
In Dutch towns and cities, many bike-only routes are not alongside the roadway, nor do they run close by and parallel to major car routes: rather, cycle routes are often completely separate from motor vehicle routes. In many cases, dedicated bike routes are far more direct than the local car routes are to common destinations, such as town centres. This complete separation of bicycle routes from motor vehicle routes is called the unravelling of modes and is an important feature of modern Dutch urban design and traffic management.

For instance, many Dutch towns and cities have a "soft" green core that is only accessible to cyclists and pedestrians. Therefore, while drivers wishing to cross the town may have to take a lengthy detour via a ring road, cyclists can take a direct route through the town centre.

Other cycle routes work similarly. On a small scale, short sections of cycle path can provide a short cut between streets that cars cannot take, while on a larger scale entire streets are sometimes converted to cycle paths to provide more room for cyclists and discourage the use of motorized vehicles.

Free-running cycle paths also exist for recreational purposes, in parks and in the countryside. These are usually bidirectional.

=== Countryside ===
On busy and important routes, cycling facilities in the countryside are similar to those in the cities. Cycle paths are made where possible, and cycle lanes otherwise. If the available space is too limited even for a cycle lane, for example when a road passes through a village, speed-reducing measures are usually taken to ensure that the difference in speed between cyclists and motorists is tolerable.

Highways and "provincial roads" (main roads for which a province is responsible), are usually fitted with separate cycle paths. Motorways, on the other hand, rarely have cycling facilities associated with them. If a cycle path is bundled with a motorway it usually lies at a relatively large distance from the road, outside the traffic barriers and noise barriers.

Apart from these utility paths and lanes, many recreational paths are available in the countryside. Their pavement varies from gravel through asphalt. Crushed seashells are a popular variant.

=== Doorfietsroutes (continuous cycle routes) ===
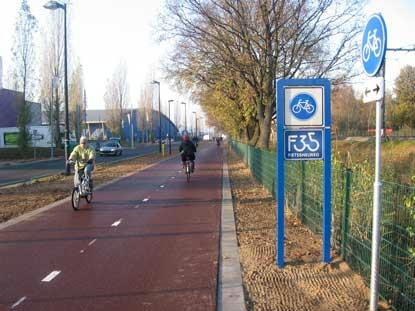
Cyclists on the F35 doorfietsroute in Enschede.

A doorfietsroute (a continuous cycle route, literally through-bicycle route) is a bicycle-only route intended for cycling longer distances quickly, safely and directly. These are mainly used for practical reasons, i.e. for getting quickly from A to B, particularly for commuting to work or to school, but are also used for sport and exercise or leisure. Since 2022, doorfietsroute has been the agreed national term in Dutch national and provincial policy, and has been formally adopted by a growing number of provinces; nevertheless, some provinces and organisations use other terms such as snelfietsroute (fast bicycle route) or fietssnelweg (bicycle highway).

Some characteristics of a doorfietsroute as determined by local governments, the national government, and traffic experts are: bi-directional paths with recommended uni-directional lane widths of 2 metres (6 feet) and minimum widths of 1.5 metres (5 feet); very level and straight stretches (i.e. few ups and downs, curves or turns); the absence of traffic lights and level crossings with motorised traffic; and superior pavement quality. Some provinces, notably Groningen and Drenthe, require that they must keep these routes snow- and ice-free in winter.

As of 2026, about 1,118 km of doorfietsroutes had been completed in the Netherlands, with a further 1,200 km funded and planned by around 2030; by 2030, another 2,300-plus km of more complex crossings of motorways, railways and waterways are planned to be built. (A list of operational doorfietsroutes can be found here.)

An example of a doorfietsroute is the Fietssnelweg 35 (F35) in the eastern province of Overijssel. The F35 is a 4.6 m (15 ft) wide, 62 km (39 mi) long two-lane route of red-coloured asphalt (dubbed the “red carpet”) whose surface is smooth and congenial to cycling. The route has its own lighting; it does not depend upon nearby street lighting. The F35 has two branch routes leading to towns off the main route; the 62 km total length of the F35 includes the length of main route (45.4 km) plus the length of its two branch routes (16.7 km). The 4.6 metre width includes the two grey concrete edges of 30 cm each; these edges are important parts of the route as they distinctively mark (both visually and by haptic feedback) the separation of the cycleway from its surrounds and thus contribute greatly to safety, helping cyclists to stick to the path and helping to keep vehicles off of it.

Most doorfietsroute projects are not entirely purpose-built, but consist of upgrading existing infrastructure and connecting existing cycling paths by building the missing stretches between them.

Cycling interest groups and national and local governments advocate doorfietsroutes as being a solution for the further reduction of vehicular traffic congestion: this is because, as cyclists can achieve higher average speeds on these routes than on the usual types of cycling infrastructure, so cyclists are better able to compete with the car for longer commutes on them.

=== Roundabouts ===
Some roundabouts have cyclist lanes around them, with signposts directing the cyclist to a destination. Traffic on roundabouts in the Netherlands usually has priority over entering traffic, and when a cycle lane is bundled with it this priority also applies to the cyclists. This means that cars have to give priority to bicycles both when entering and exiting the roundabout.

Other roundabouts have separate cycle paths around them. Signs indicate whether the cycle path or the crossing road has priority. Many authorities give priority to the crossing roads, as this is thought to be safer. For fairness, others retain the priority that the cyclists would have had if they had not been using a separate cycle path (which they are obliged to use).

A very busy roundabout in Eindhoven uses tunnels and an interior roundabout for cyclists to keep the two traffic streams completely apart.

==== The Hovenring ====
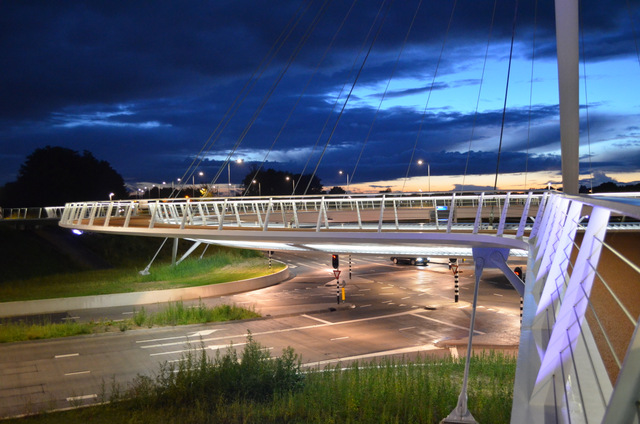
The Hovenring at night

The Hovenring is an architectural first for bicycle infrastructure. Opening on 29 June 2012, it is an elevated circular suspension bridge and bicycle-only roundabout built in between the localities of Eindhoven, Veldhoven and Meerhoven (thus the name, being Dutch for "Ring of the 'Hovens'") in the province of North Brabant. Built over a large and busy road intersection, where before its construction cyclists had to cross busy roads, it is the first suspended bicycle roundabout in the world.

=== Crossing rivers and motorways ===
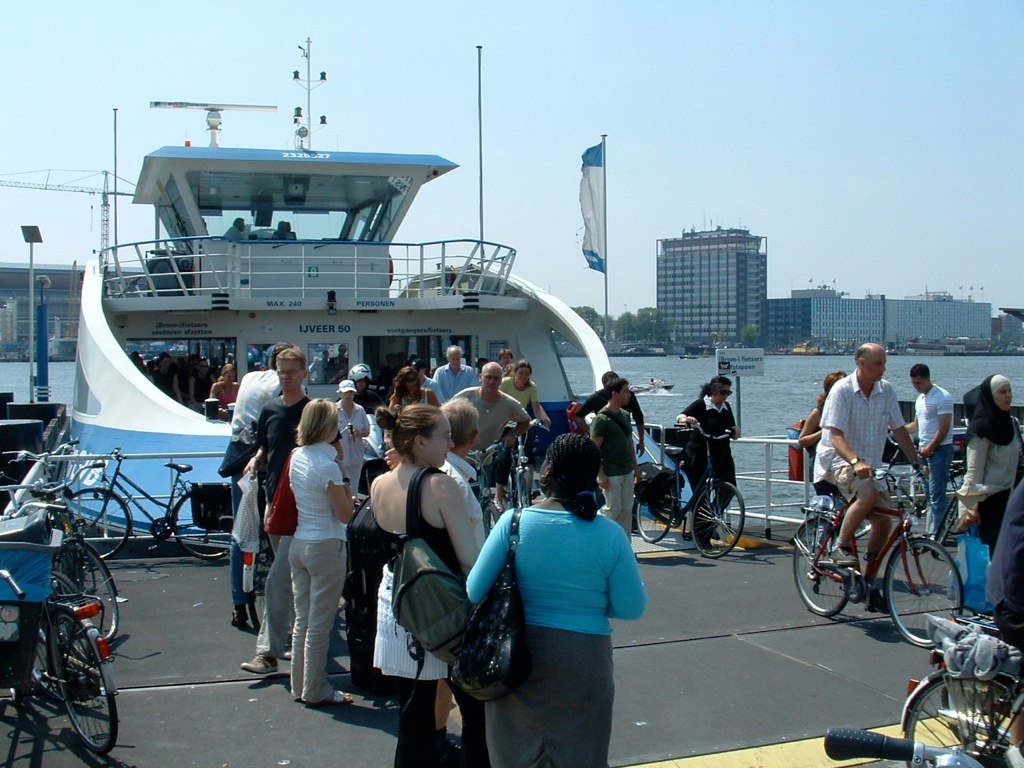
Ferry across the IJ near Amsterdam Central Station

To protect cyclists from motorised traffic when they need to cross motorways and other busy roads, dedicated cycling bridges and tunnels for cyclists are built. Such facilities are often shared with pedestrians.

The small waterways such as canals, which abound especially throughout western Holland, will often have dedicated bridges for cyclists or ones that they share with pedestrians. However, to cross large waterways, cycle paths are often situated alongside roads (for instance the Hollandse Brug) or sometimes railroads (for example the Nijmegen railway bridge). Long road tunnels are rarely open to cyclists.

When roads and railroads are too far away, ferries often provide an alternative in the Netherlands. In many cases, ferries operate exclusively or primarily for cyclists and to a lesser extent for pedestrians.

=== Traffic signals ===
Because of their constant use, cycleways are complete with their own system of traffic signals. These are present at junctions, one set for motorised vehicles and a visually smaller set for cyclists. Sometimes this is similar to a pelican crossing, where the cyclists wait to cross the junction. These lights come in two forms—firstly the miniature version of the vehicle lights and secondly a regular sized signal with bicycle-shaped cutouts.

In many locations more direct cycle routes exist which bypass traffic signals, allowing cyclists to make more efficient journeys than motorists.

Occasionally, cyclists are explicitly allowed to pass a red traffic light if they make a right turn on an intersection. They are also allowed to ignore a red light if they go through the top of a T junction on a cycle path, as there is never interaction between motorists and cyclists, and cyclists can negotiate easily with other cyclists and pedestrians.

=== Signage ===
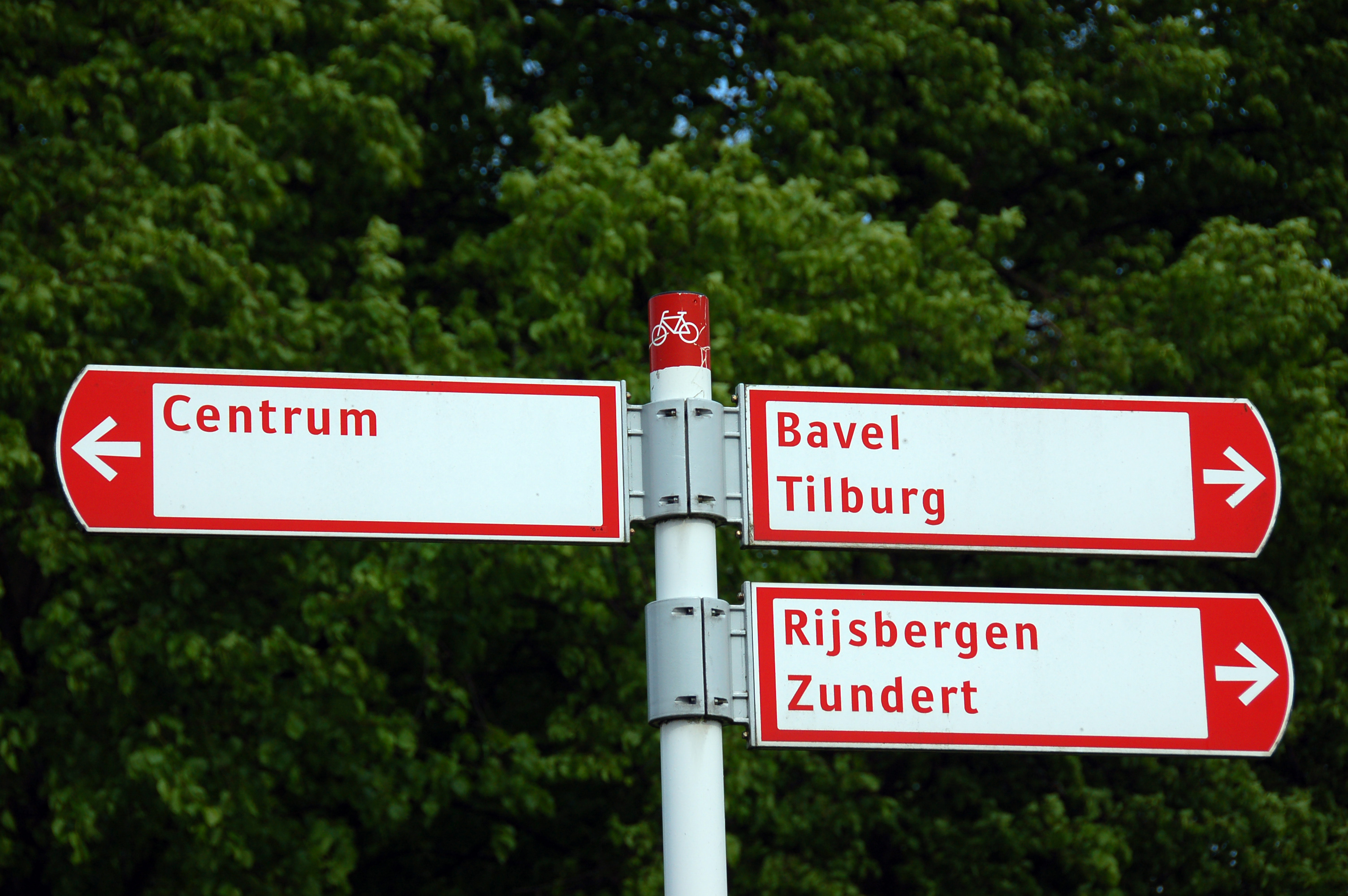
Directional signpost for cyclists

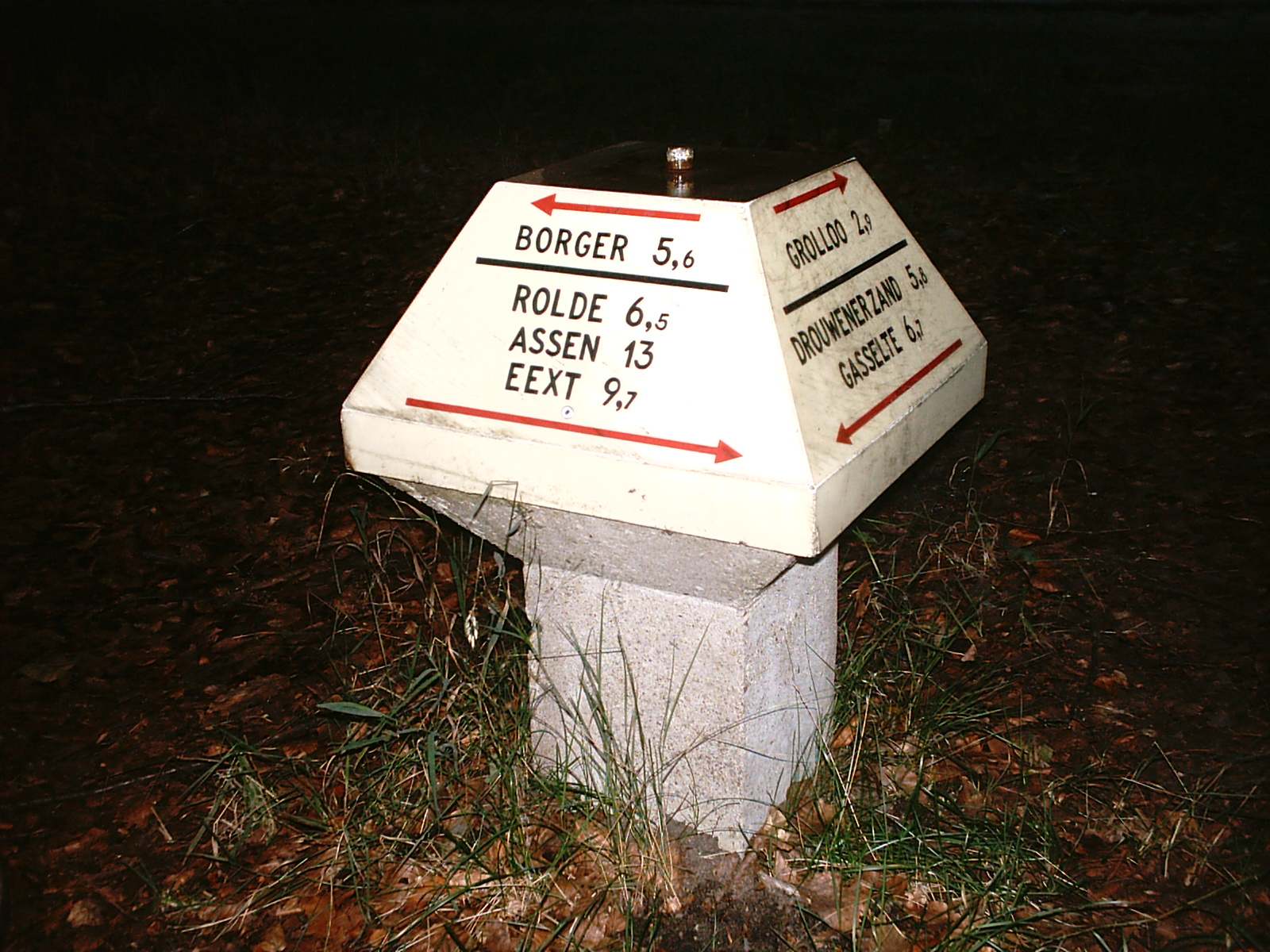
The "padstool" type of signpost

Signposts take on the form of road signs, with directions stating the distances to nearby cities and towns. Signposts come in two different forms: the common directional signpost which is a miniature version of the vehicle signs and padstool signs, mushroom-shaped direction posts. Padstools are used in the countryside where it is thought to blend in better with its surroundings. Sometimes it can be hard to notice in long grass.

In contrast to the signposts for traffic in general, which feature white lettering on a blue background, the signposts for cyclists have red or green lettering on a white background. Red is used for the usual route and green for more scenic routes where mopeds are not allowed. The mushroom-style signpost can also have black lettering on a white background (as it is obvious that it is not meant for motorists). A newer style of "mushroom" has red lettering.

When a general (white on blue) signpost is not applicable for cyclists because it relies on a motorway, this is indicated with a small car sign or a motorway sign behind the name of the destination. In such cases, a separate signpost for cyclists is usually nearby.

Most road signs for cyclists that are used in the Netherlands are universal. However, some are specific to the country and may even include some Dutch text, e.g. fietspad (cycle path), racer te gast (racers (road cyclists) are guests), (brom)fietsers oversteken (cyclists and moped riders must cross the road), uitgezonderd fietsers (except for cyclists) or rechtsaf fietsers vrij (turning right free for cyclists).

The numbered-node cycle network was first introduced in the Netherlands in 1999, and by 2014, the entire Netherlands was part to the network. The system is displacing more traditional national cycling route network signage (long, named routes, each individually signposted, called LF routes in the Netherlands). In 2017–2021, the Netherlands reduced its LF-routes, amalgamating some of them. The ways themselves remained part of the numbered-node network.

=== Parking ===
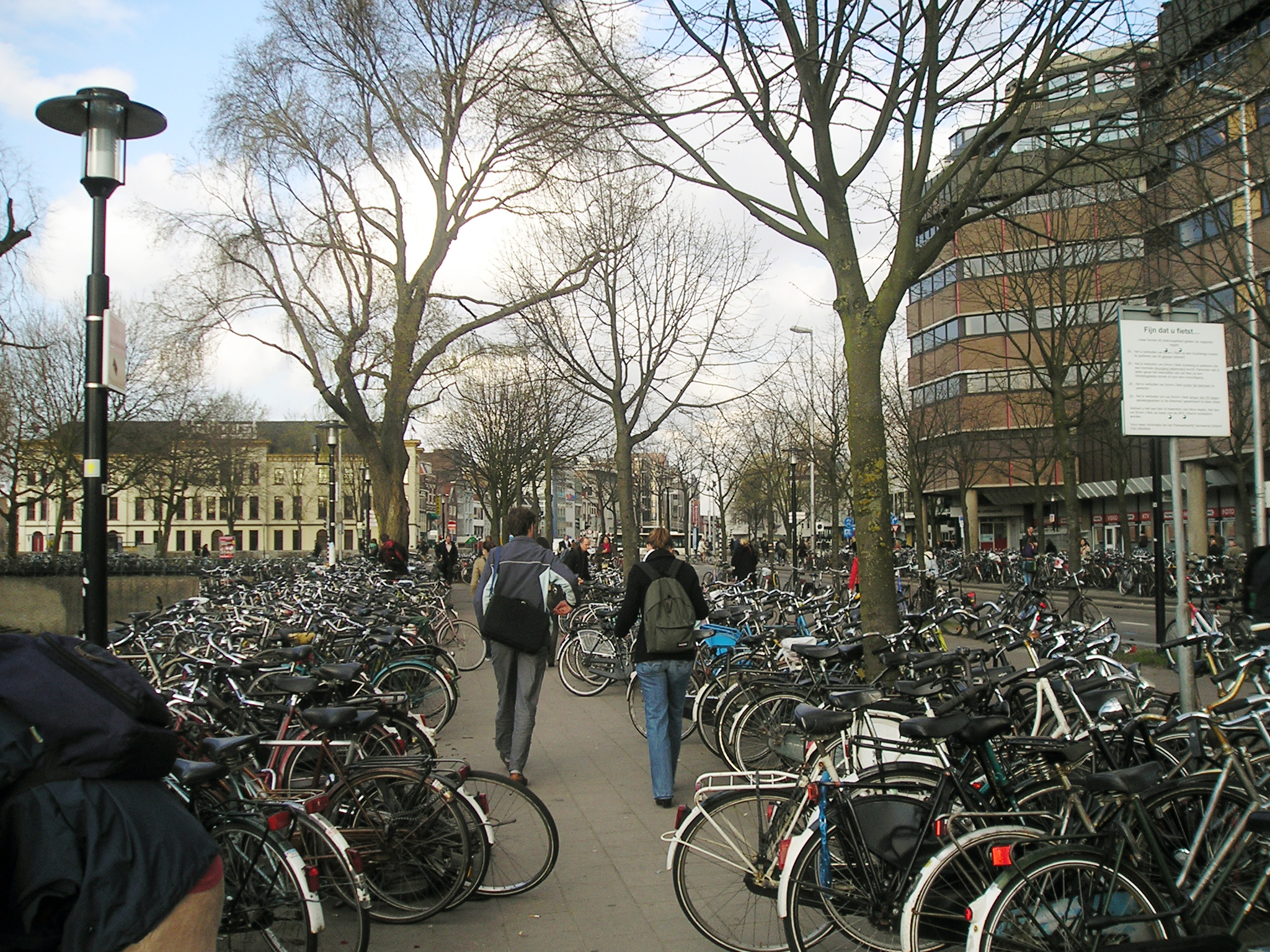
Bicycle parking in Utrecht (2006)

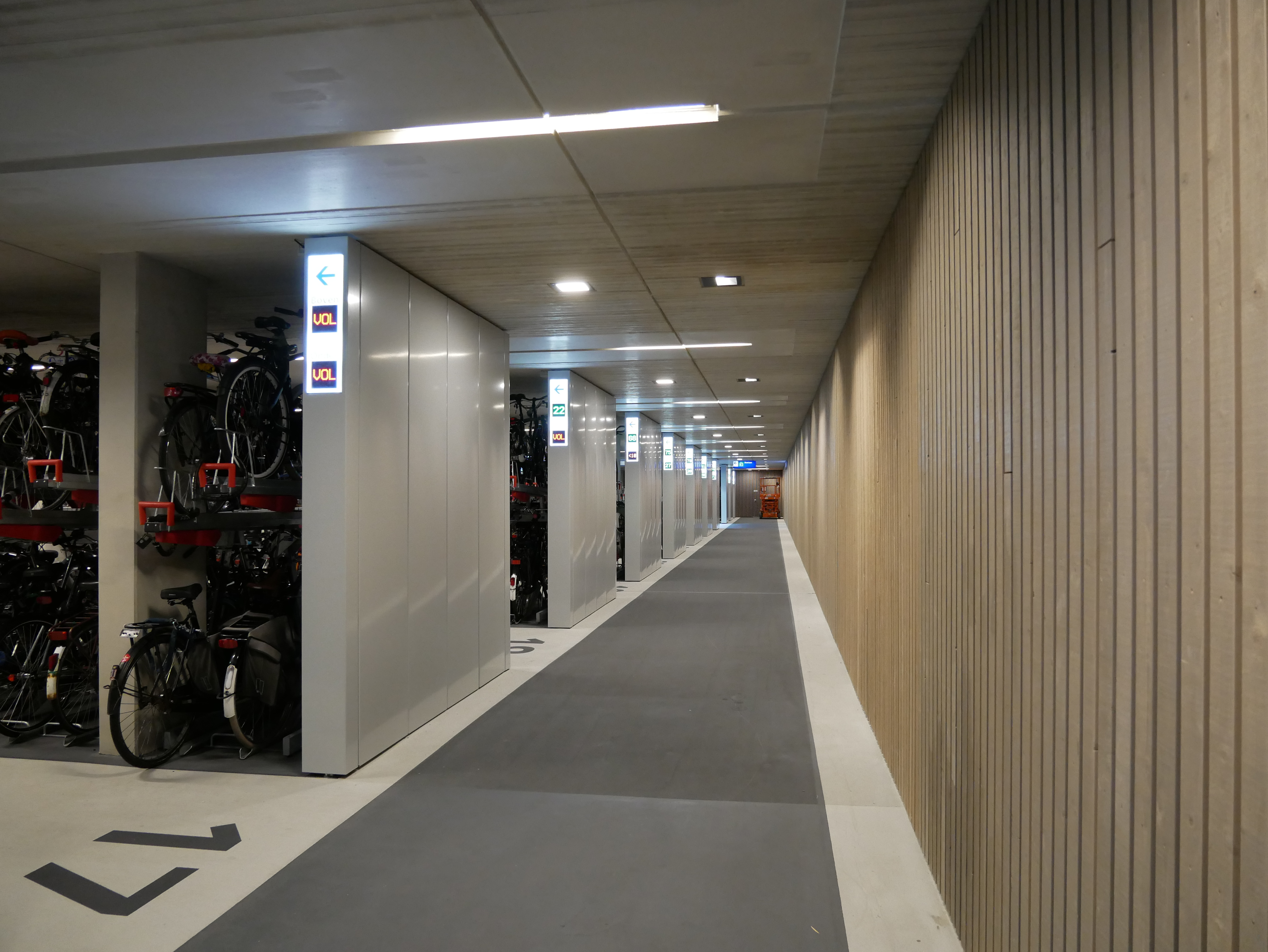
Bicycle parking in Utrecht (2019)

By policy in the Netherlands, bicycle parking is supposed to be provided next to every shop. Bicycle stands are common around the Netherlands, an alternative to chaining the bike to a post. In most, the front wheel of the bicycle rests on the stand. As bike theft is very common in the Netherlands, cyclists are advised to lock their bicycle with a built-in lock and attach a chain from the bike frame to the stand.

There are many bicycle parking stations, particularly in city centres and at train stations, some of which hold many thousands of bicycles. Every railway station has a cycle parking attached, and most also offer guarded cycle parking for a nominal fee. Since the start of the 21st century, parking spaces for 450,000 bicycles were built and modernized at over 400 train stations, and Dutch railways organizations ProRail and NS are calling for expansion by another 250,000 by 2027. Already half of all Dutch train travellers cycle to the station, amounting to half a million cyclists daily. These types of bicycle parking stations also exist in other places around most cities, for example, there are 20 watched bicycle parking stations situated in the city of Groningen (population ≈198,000).

Most city councils enforce the parking of bicycles in their jurisdictions by regularly removing any bicycles that are not placed in the bike stands. The locks are cut and for the owner to reclaim their bicycle they must pay a fine of around €25. Cyclist journeys are made more convenient by such actions as it prevents sidewalks being littered with bikes.

== Bike rental ==
Bikes for all ages are readily available for rent across the country and most large towns have bike shops with all the necessary equipment and repair services. All cities possess multiple bike stands, mainly at the supermarkets and other commonly used shops. Bikes should also come with a lock so as to keep the bike from being stolen. A national scheme, Cycleswap, supports small businesses privately renting bicycles out for short-term use.

=== OV-fiets ===
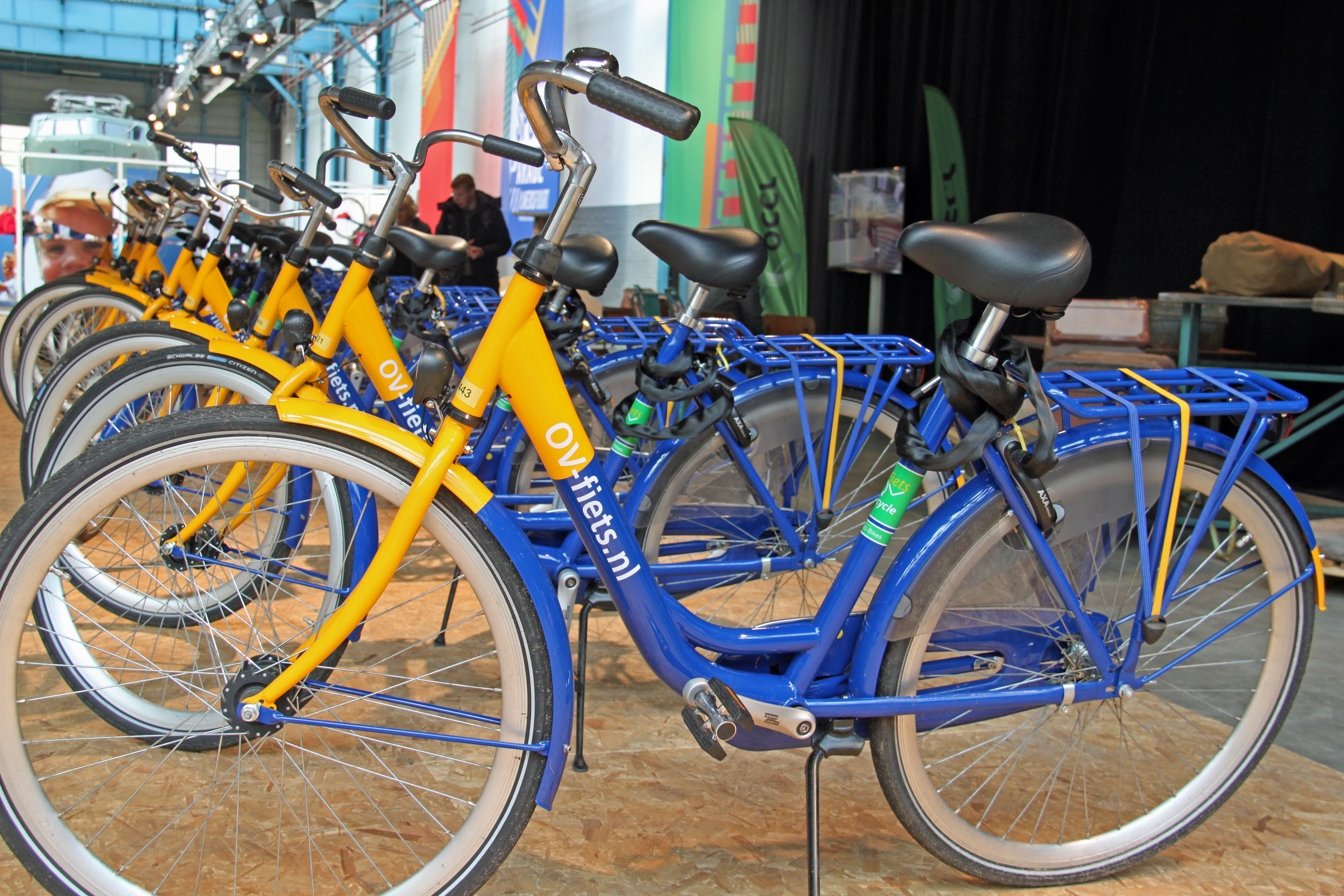
OV-fiets share bikes in the Netherlands

OV-fiets (literally: "Public Transport bicycle") is the name of a very large, nationwide bicycle rental / sharing system run by Nederlandse Spoorwegen aka NS (Dutch Railways)—by far the Netherlands' largest rail service operator. Almost 15,000 OV-fietsen are offered for rent at over 300 locations across the Netherlands; at many train stations, at bus or tram stops, in several city centres and at P+R car parks. When you arrive at a town's station by train, you can quickly rent an OV-fiets to cycle to your destination.

The OV-fiets program, which started on a small scale in 2003, has steadily grown in popularity, first registering 1 million rides in 2011, but Dutch Rail expected 3 million rides in 2017, up 25% from 2.4 million in 2016. However, this was even exceeded—the number came out at 3.2 million.

In recent years Dutch Rail expanded their rental fleet by around 1000 bicycles a year to keep up with demand. However, a surge in demand forced NS to rush order an extra 6000 bicycles in 2017. The company aimed to have 14,500 bicycles available by the end of 2017.

Membership to the OV-fiets scheme is free with a free OV-fiets season ticket (and automatically included for those with any other NS subscription). Bikes can be accessed using the normal OV-Chipkaart —and 24-hour rental costs €4.55 as of November 2024. Since the new policy is in place, the number of registered users has jumped from ≈200,000 to ≈500,000.

The nature of the OV-fiets bike sharing program differs somewhat from that of similar schemes in other countries, partly because of the already high bike ownership of the population. The Dutch system is highly integrated with the public transport network, so that people who cycle to the station in their place of origin can continue travelling by bike from the station of their destination.

=== Swapfiets ===
Swapfiets is a bike rental service for residents of several European countries that, for a fixed monthly price, provides a bicycle and covers all repair costs. It requires the use of a smartphone app. The service started as a startup that rented refurbished bikes but has since developed an in-house design featuring a distinctive blue front tire.

== Bicycle touring ==
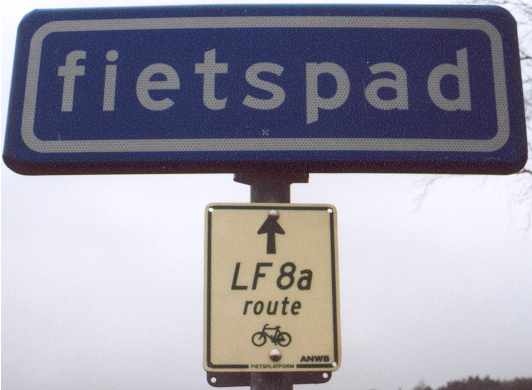
Sign for national cycle route LF 8a under the general cycle track sign

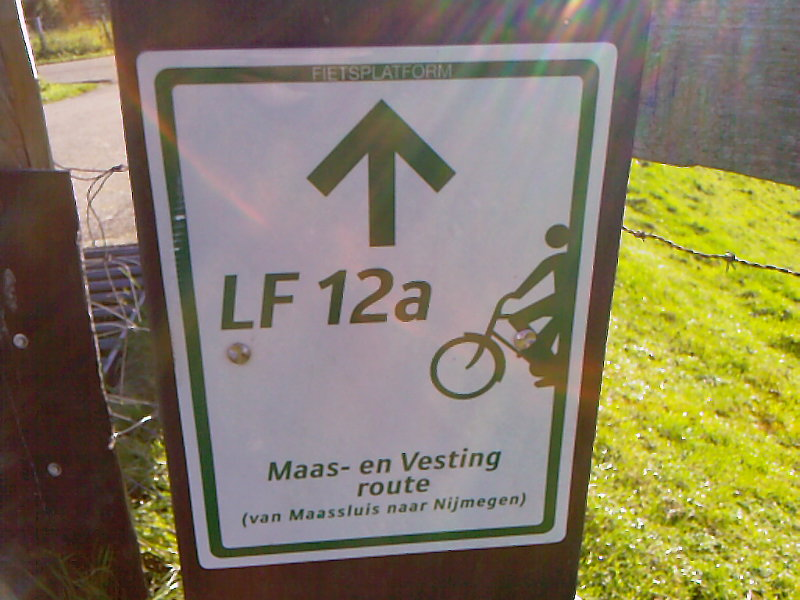
Sign for route LF 12a a.k.a. the Maas- en Vesting route

For bicycle touring, all Dutch cities can be accessed on the dedicated cycling routes. There are two main signage systems, the older named-route Dutch National Cycle Network—the LF-routes—and the numbered-node cycle network or knooppunten network. There are also additional regional cycle paths. Some of the LF routes have been amalgamated and removed in 2017–2021, and may not be shown accurately on older maps; the former LF routes are now part of the knooppunten network, which is displacing named long-distance routes in Belgium and the Netherlands. An average cyclist can typically expect to cover between 15 and 18 kilometres (10 and 12 miles), on average, in an hour by bike throughout most areas of the Netherlands.

Print cycling maps are widely available and come in two forms:

- Route maps: a national map which shows route information rather than general topography. Only the routes are marked and related information are shown. They are often used for holidays and are sold at most tourist shops.
- National maps: These cover the whole country, with markings and symbols about the cycleways of the Netherlands. Most national cycle maps will include the LF-routes and the other routes of the numbered-node cycle network. These are used for cycling in unfamiliar towns and cities, and also for cross-country use.

There are also comprehensive digital maps and route planning tools in a variety of languages, available online or in downloadable apps. OpenStreetMap, a Wikipedia-style map, has extensive information on the numbered-node network, available as downloadable maps and datasets under the Open Database License.

Though the LF-route network is the national cycling route network of the Netherlands, some of its routes extend into the neighbouring countries of Belgium and Germany; the LF1 even extends all the way down the North Sea coast to Boulogne-sur-Mer in France.

There is also a professional cycle-tour industry in the Netherlands, run by professional cycling-tour operators.

== Transporting bicycles ==
It is possible to take bicycles on trains, aircraft and ferries. Buses, however, will only carry folded bicycles.

=== Trains ===
Bicycles may be carried on trains under certain conditions. Folding bicycles can be taken more easily than other types as regular bicycles must be placed in designated areas. Taking a folded bicycle inside a train is free, but for unfolded bicycles and regular ones a special ticket is required. As of 2022, these tickets cost €7.50 per bicycle and are valid for a whole day. In all trains it is prohibited to carry normal size and (partly) unfolded bikes during peak hours, though this restriction does not apply in the summer in July and August when bikes can be carried for at any time of day with a bike ticket. All bicycles are allowed, even a recumbent or a tandem. However, it is prohibited to take a tricycle or a bicycle trailer on trains.

Travellers are expected to place their bicycles in the designated areas: blue stickers on or near the doors indicate where they are.

=== Ferries ===
Ferries are commonplace in the Netherlands for crossing both rivers and canals, including numerous foot ferries that operate especially for cyclists and foot passengers saving them from making long detours. There are ferries as well as to the islands in the North (Texel, Vlieland, Terschelling, Ameland and Schiermonnikoog). It is important to know where ferries are and when they run.

Some ferries (such as those to Texel, Vlieland, Terschelling, Ameland and Schiermonnikoog) impose an extra charge for bicycles, while others (such as those across the IJ in Amsterdam) carry bicycles for free.

=== By air ===
It is possible to take bicycles by air, but the airline's procedures must be followed to pack the bicycle and possibly dismantle it. There may also be extra fees as the bicycle will count as luggage. Again, travelling with a foldable bike is easier.

== The Fietsgemeente awards ==
In 2000, the Dutch Fietsersbond (Cyclists' Union) inaugurated the Fietsstad awards where a town or city was bestowed the honour of being a recognised Fietsstad (bicycle city). In 2022, the awards were expanded to include all of the Netherlands’ municipalities (gemeente), not just towns and cities, and was therefore retitled the Fietsgemeente (bicycle municipality) awards, with additional awards being given for different sized municipalities. Since 2014, the awards have been held every two years.

Today, the awards are typically awarded based on large-scale cyclist surveys (often 40,000+ responses) combined with objective data on infrastructure, safety, and related factors, with recent winners generally excluded from competing for about 10 years. This differs from the original main criteria where the award was given solely by a jury to the municipality that was already great for cycling and had improved the most, not necessarily the one that had the best overall cycling environment as that might mean that the same municipality would win every year. In addition, between 2008 and 2016 there was a unique theme that the jury used to decide the winner.

As of 2026, the municipalities that have been awarded the title of Fietsstad or Fietsgemeente are:

| Year | Winner | Notes |
|---|---|---|
| 2000 | Veenendaal | |
| 2002 | Groningen | |
| 2008 | Houten | Theme: Veilig en fietsvriendelijk (Safe and bicycle friendly) |
| 2011 | 's-Hertogenbosch | Theme: Veilige schoolomgeving (Safe school environment) |
| 2014 | Zwolle | Theme: Fietsen zonder hindernissen (Cycling without obstacles) |
| 2016 | Nijmegen | Theme: Bikenomics |
| 2018 | Houten | Houten also won in 2008. |
| 2020 | Veenendaal | Veenendaal also won in 2000. Last recipient to be awarded the title of Fietsstad. |
| 2022 | Schiermonnikoog (overall winner and also winner of best small municipality), as well as: Best medium-sized municipality: Gooise Meren; Best large municipality: Zoetermeer; Fastest-rising municipality: Alphen-Chaam | These are the first recipients to be awarded the title of Fietsgemeente. |
| 2024 | Noord-Beveland (overall winner and also winner of best small municipality), as well as: Best medium-sized municipality: Kampen; Best large municipality: Zoetermeer; Fastest-rising municipality: Texel | |
| 2026 | Tubbergen (overall winner and also winner of best small municipality), as well as: Best medium-sized municipality: Pijnacker-Nootdorp; Best large municipality: Zwolle; Fastest-rising municipality: not awarded | Zwolle also won in 2014. |

== Gallery ==
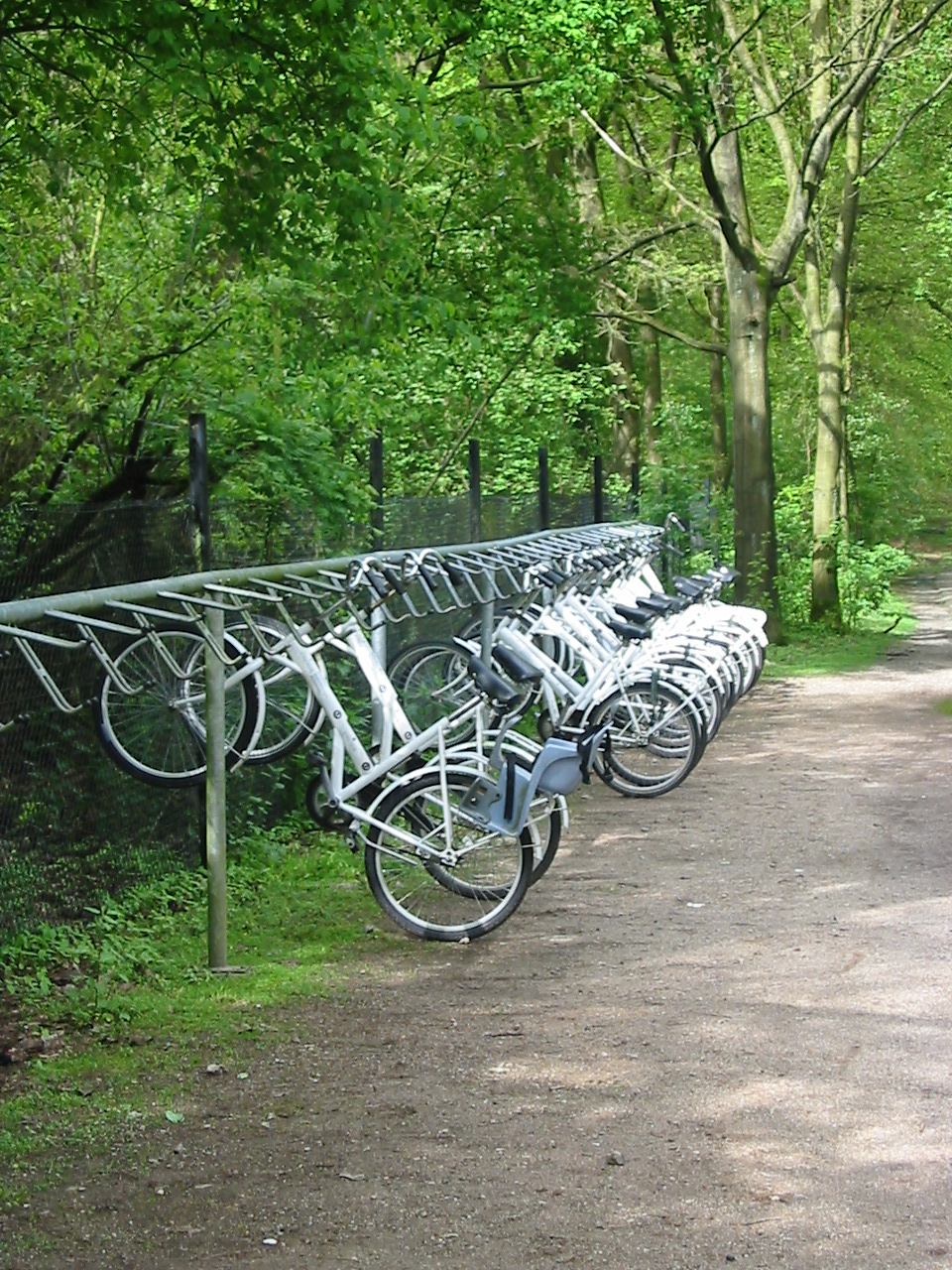
White bicycles, for free use, in Hoge Veluwe National Park

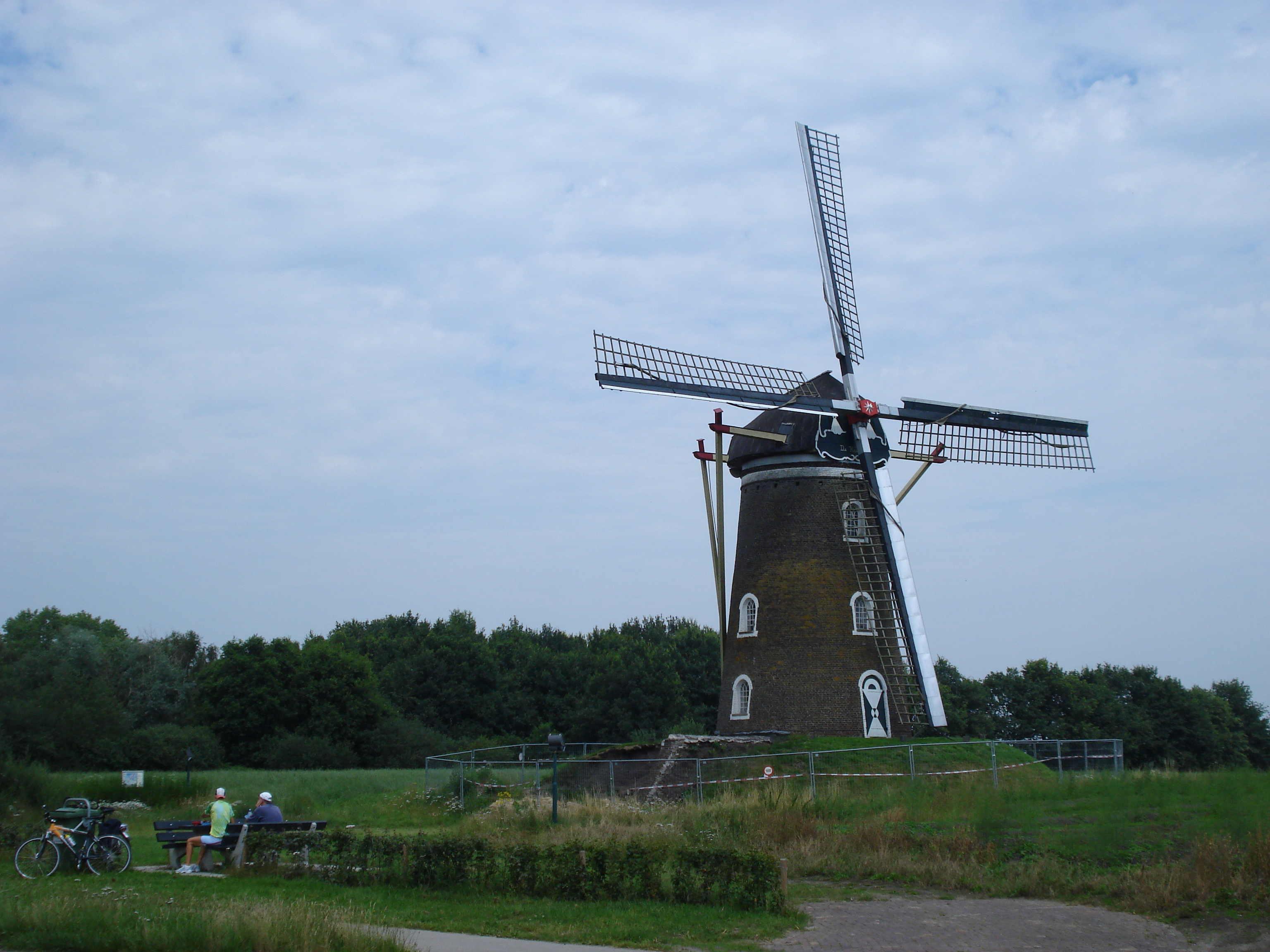
Riders taking a break at the St Hubert windmill

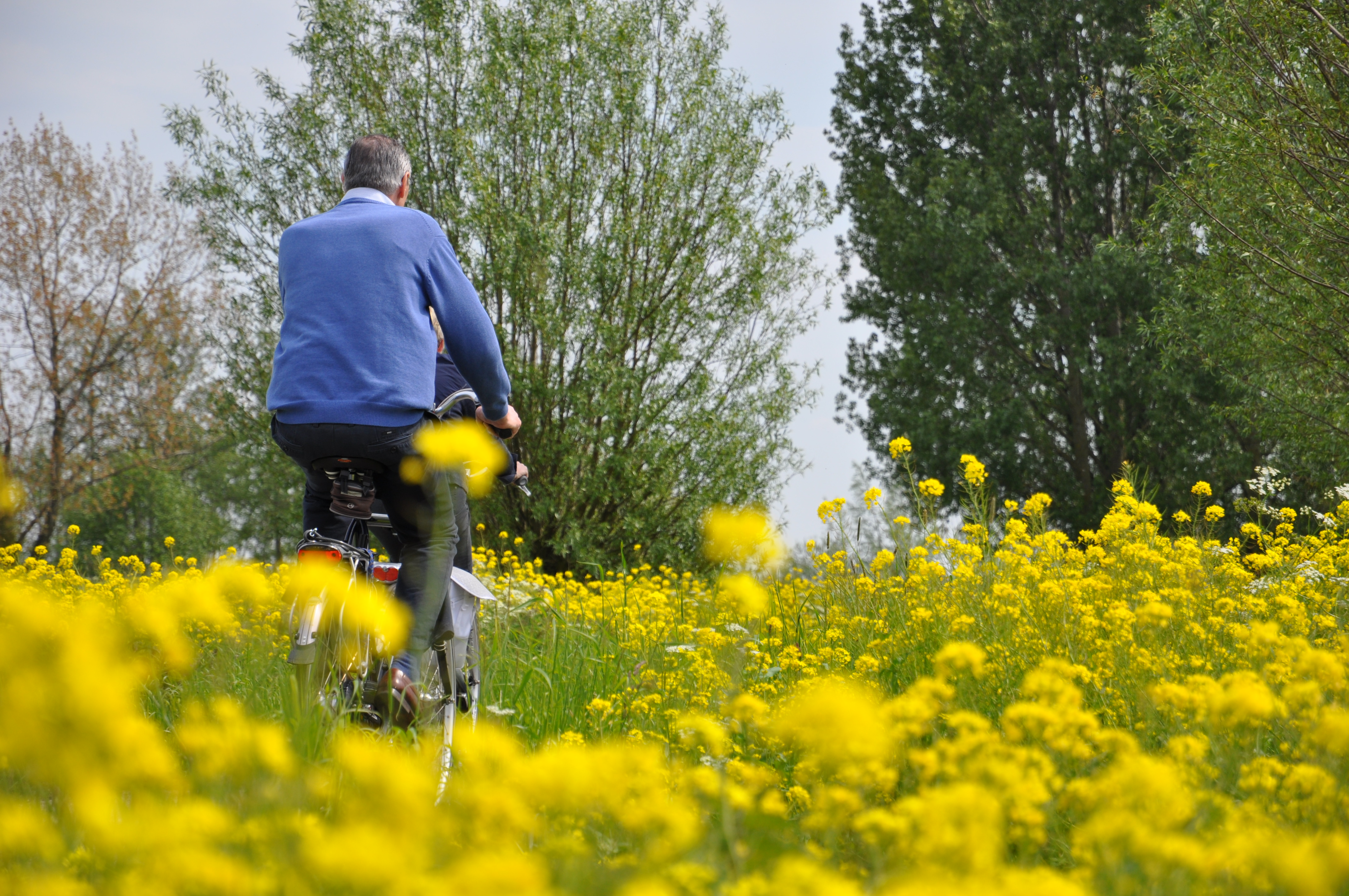
Cycling through rapeseed fields, Polsbroekerdam

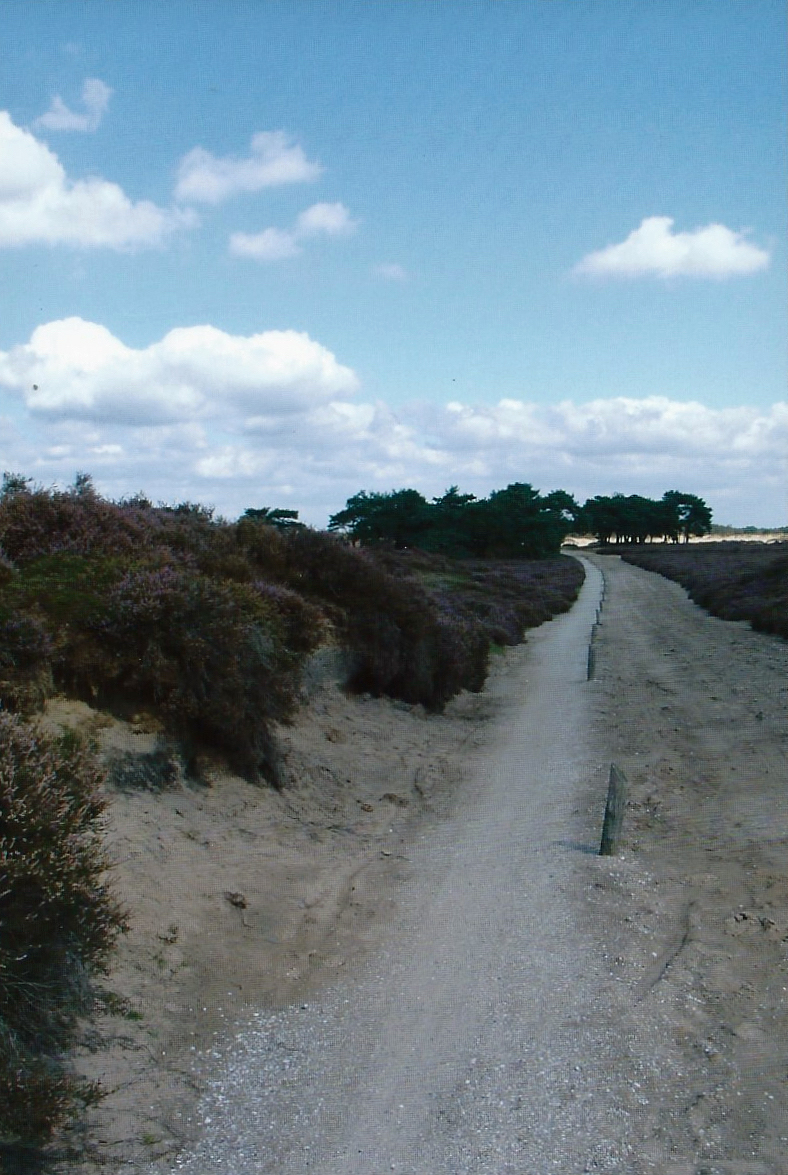
A recreational cycle path made of crushed seashells, Balloërveld

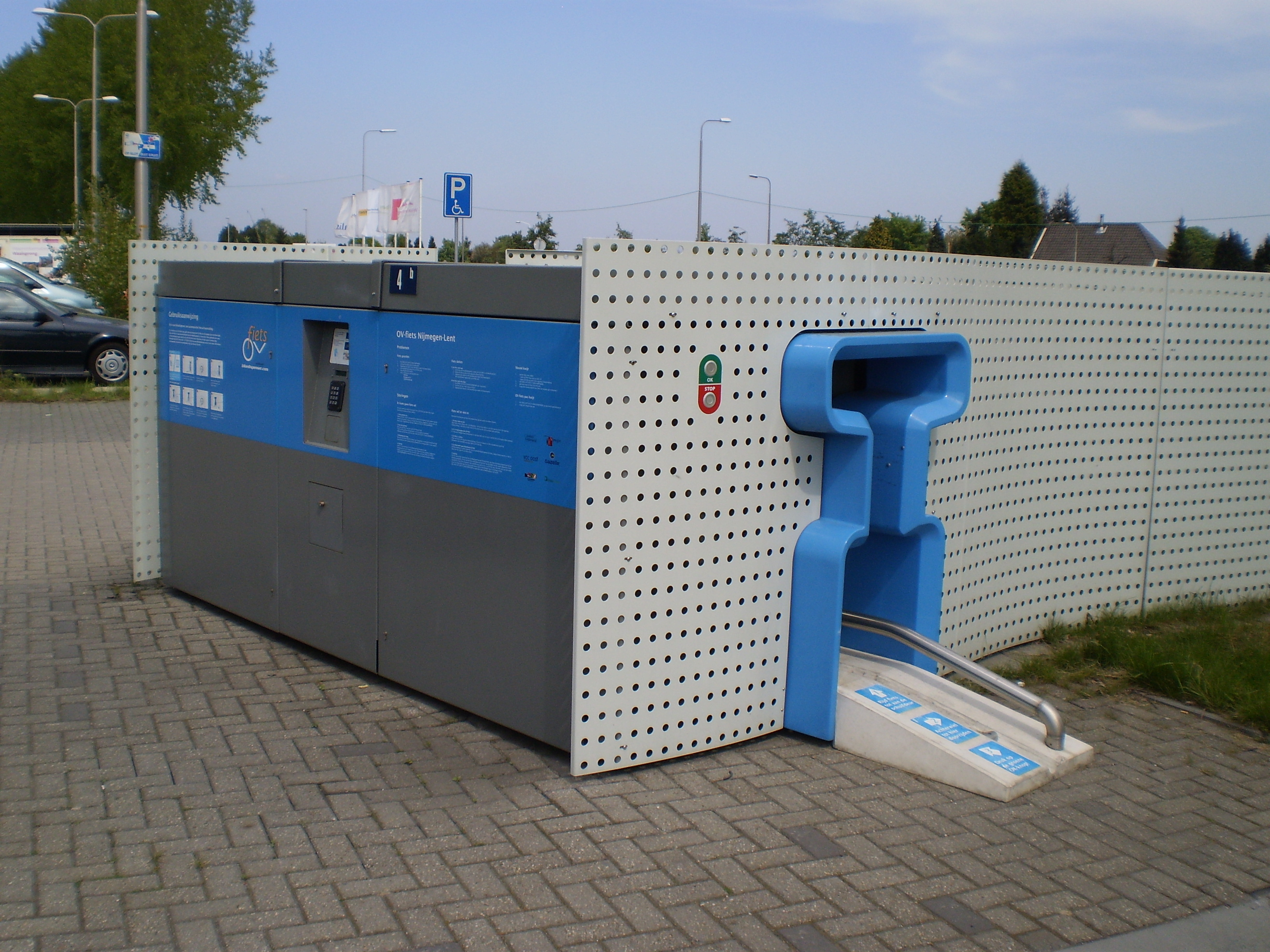
An OV-fiets dispenser at Lent train station

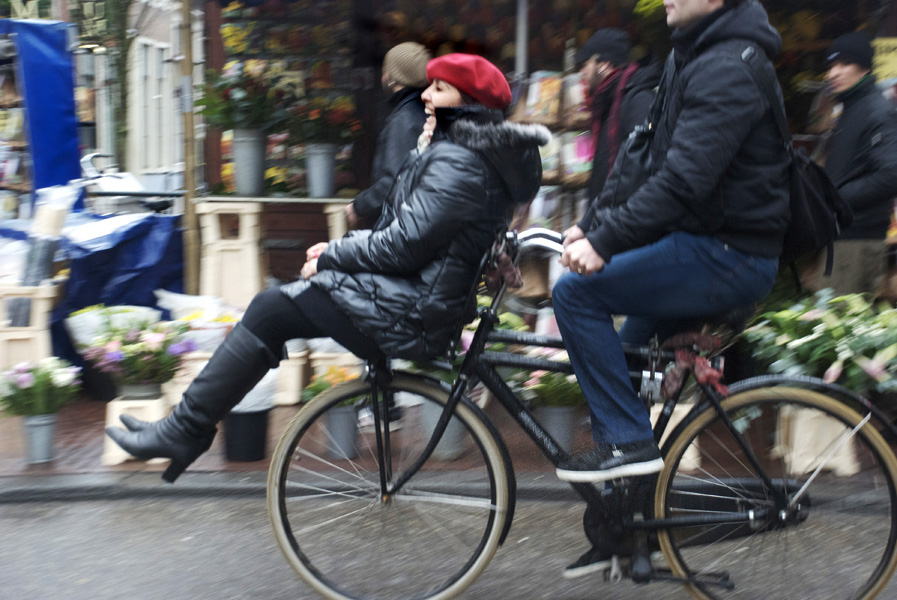
Chauffeur-driven bicycle, on Damstraat in Amsterdam

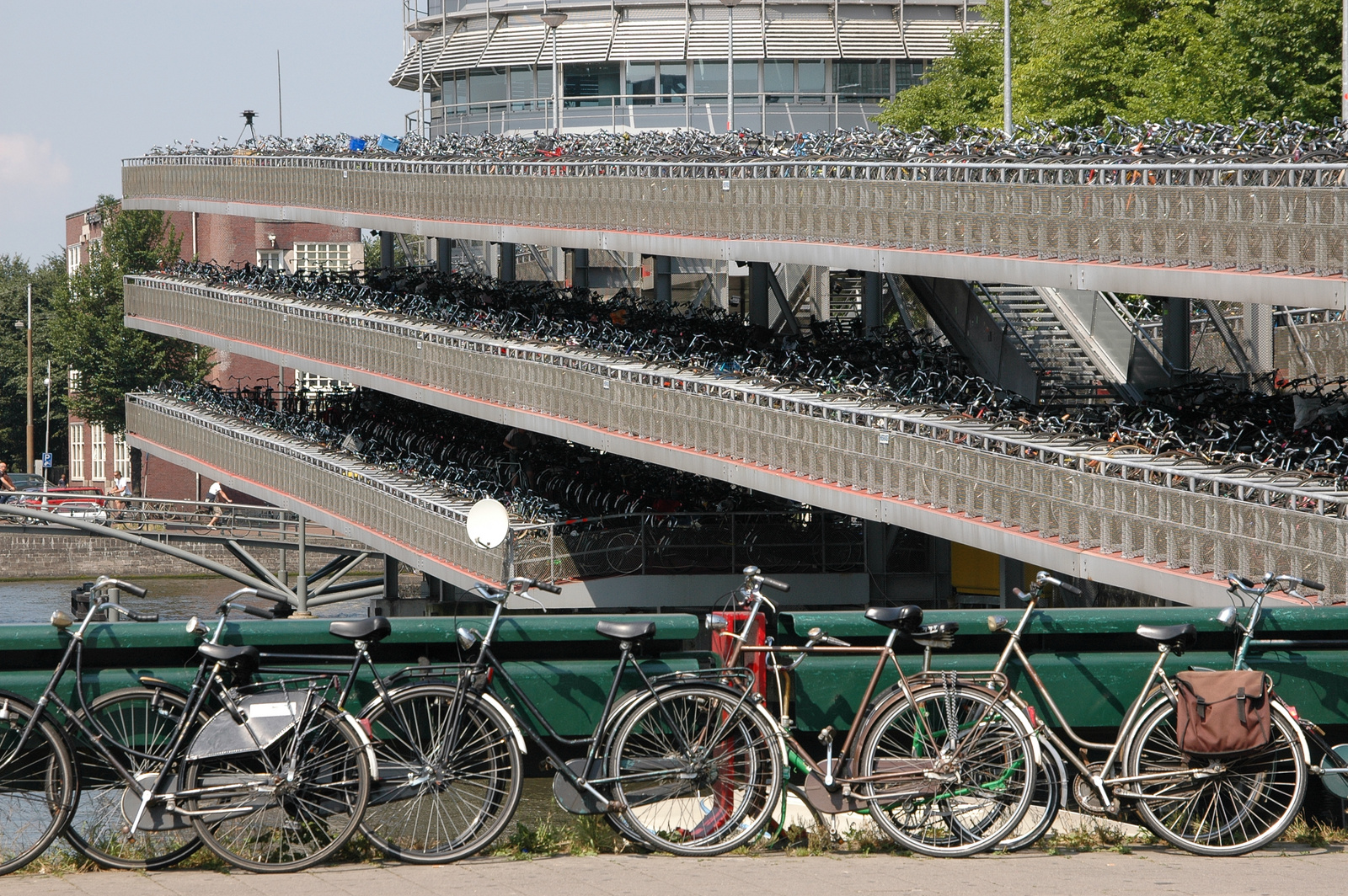
Amsterdam's Fietsflat, a three-storey bicycle parking station at Centraal train station

== See also ==
- Bicycle monarchy, nickname for a royal family with more informal and modest personal style
- Cycling in Amsterdam, known as one of the world's most bicycle-friendly cities
- David Hembrow, a British-Dutch cycling advocate
- Dutch National Cycle Routes, network of long-distance cycling routes
- Fietsersbond (the Cyclists' Union), an organisation working for bicycle friendly infrastructure
- List of bicycle-sharing systems
- Outline of cycling
- Transport in the Netherlands
