= Hembrow =

Hembrow is a surname. Notable people with the surname include:

- David Hembrow, Dutch cycling advocate
- David Hembrow (swimmer) (born 1947), British swimmer
- Mark Hembrow (born 1955), Australian actor
