= Fietsersbond =

Voluntary association for cyclists in the Netherlands

The logo of the Dutch Fietsersbond (Cyclists' Union).

The Dutch Fietsersbond (Cyclists' Union) is an organisation which represents the interests of cyclists in the Netherlands by working towards the expansion and improvement of bicycle friendly infrastructure. The Fietsersbond does this by lobbying, and working with, all levels of government on urban planning, policies, and laws, etc. to improve cycling conditions and make Dutch cities, towns and country areas safer and easier to get around in for anyone who rides a bike — which is a large proportion of the population: approximately 5 million Dutch people ride every day out of the country's total population of 16.8 million.

The Fietsersbond lobbies politicians and the civil service on all levels — national, provincial and local — to achieve (among other things):

- excellent and direct cycling infrastructure with a constant aim for new ideas and innovative designs,
- more and improved parking spaces for bikes,
- effective action against bicycle theft, and
- greater safety for cyclists.

They provide and/or conduct:

- development of a crowdsourced cycling route planner, maintained by volunteers (routeplanner.fietsersbond.nl)
- giving advice to local, regional and national authorities about cycling policy
- national and regional campaigns about cycling facilities, road safety and bike lighting.
- research about cycling in the Netherlands

The Fietsersbond has 32,000 members, has more than 1500 active volunteers, is organised into 150 local branches across the country, and is organised from its national office at Utrecht which has 25 staff members. It is a member of the European Cyclists' Federation (ECF) and through that the World Cycling Alliance and is a principal partner of the Dutch Cycling Embassy. It publishes a quarterly members' magazine called the Vogelvrije Fietser (a play of words meaning both "Free-as-a-bird Cyclist" and "Outlawed Cyclist"). The organisation also conducts the Fietsstad (Cycling City) awards every few years where a Dutch town or city that has done extraordinarily well in improving and expanding its cycling infrastructure, is honoured.

(Note that Flanders, the Dutch-speaking part of Belgium, has its own cyclists' union, also called the Fietsersbond.)

== See also ==
- Cycling in the Netherlands
- Cycling in Amsterdam
- Royal Dutch Cycling Union (KNWU), the governing body of cycle racing in the Netherlands
