= Maartje van Putten =

Dutch politician (born 1951)

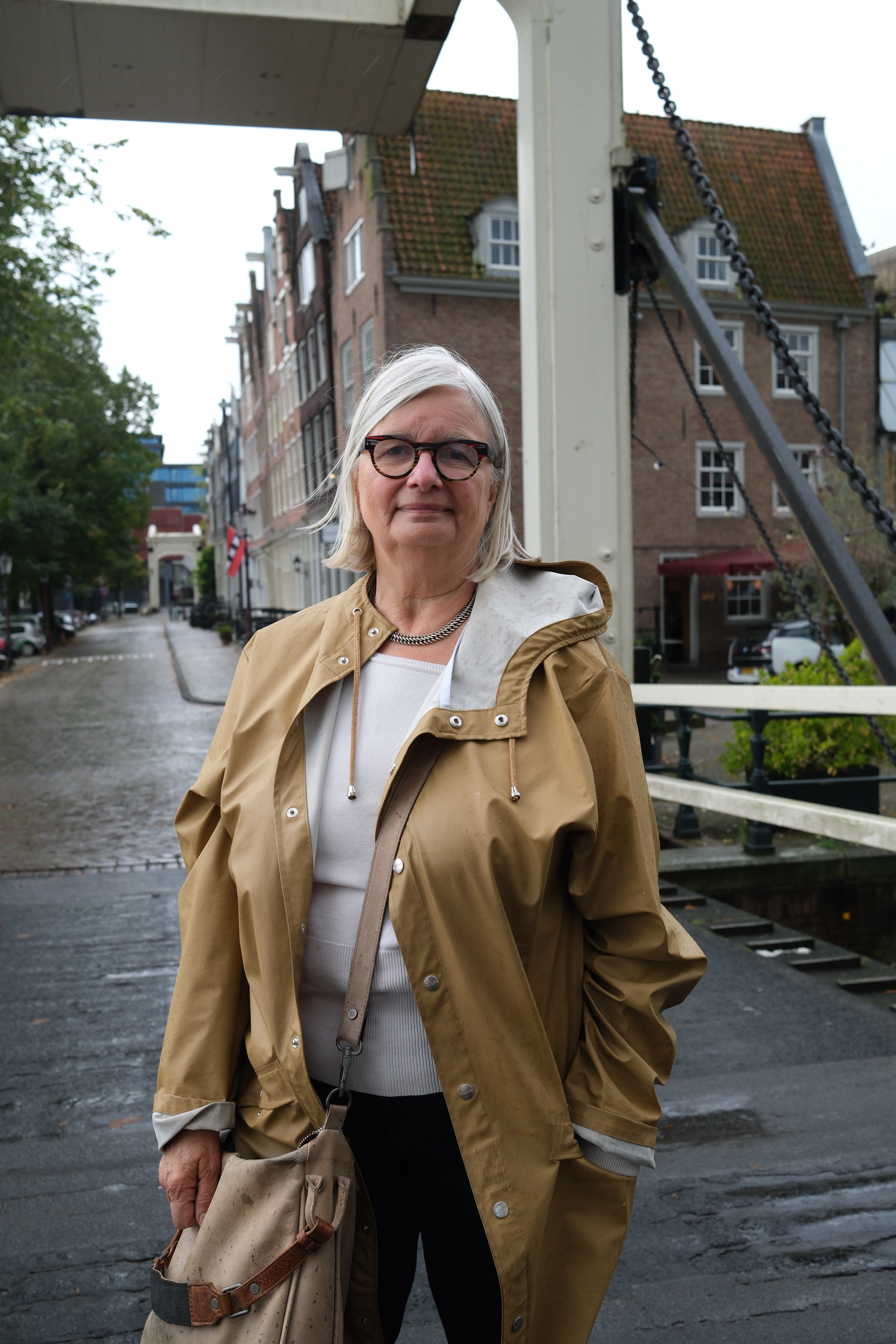
- Maartje in Amsterdam
- Born: 5 July 1951 (age 75); Bussum, the Netherlands

Maria Jeanette Anna (Maartje) van Putten (born 5 July 1951, in Bussum) is a Dutch politician.

In her early 20s she was instrumental in shifting Dutch transport policy towards safer streets, with the lasting effect that the Netherlands has excellent cycle infrastructure.

Her actions included organising a mass cycle ride to the home of the Dutch Prime Minister, broadcast live on national radio, and a children's cycle ride through a car-only tunnel in the north of Amsterdam.

She was a Member of the European Parliament (MEP) for the Dutch Labour Party (PvdA) between 1989 and 1999, in which she was committed to the protection of nature and environment in developing countries.

She later served as a member of the World Bank's Inspection Panel and wrote her PhD thesis on accountability mechanisms. She is a member of the Independent Review Mechanism of the African Development Bank (AfDB), and CEO of Global Accountability.
