= Cycling in Amsterdam =

Mode of transport in Amsterdam, the Netherlands

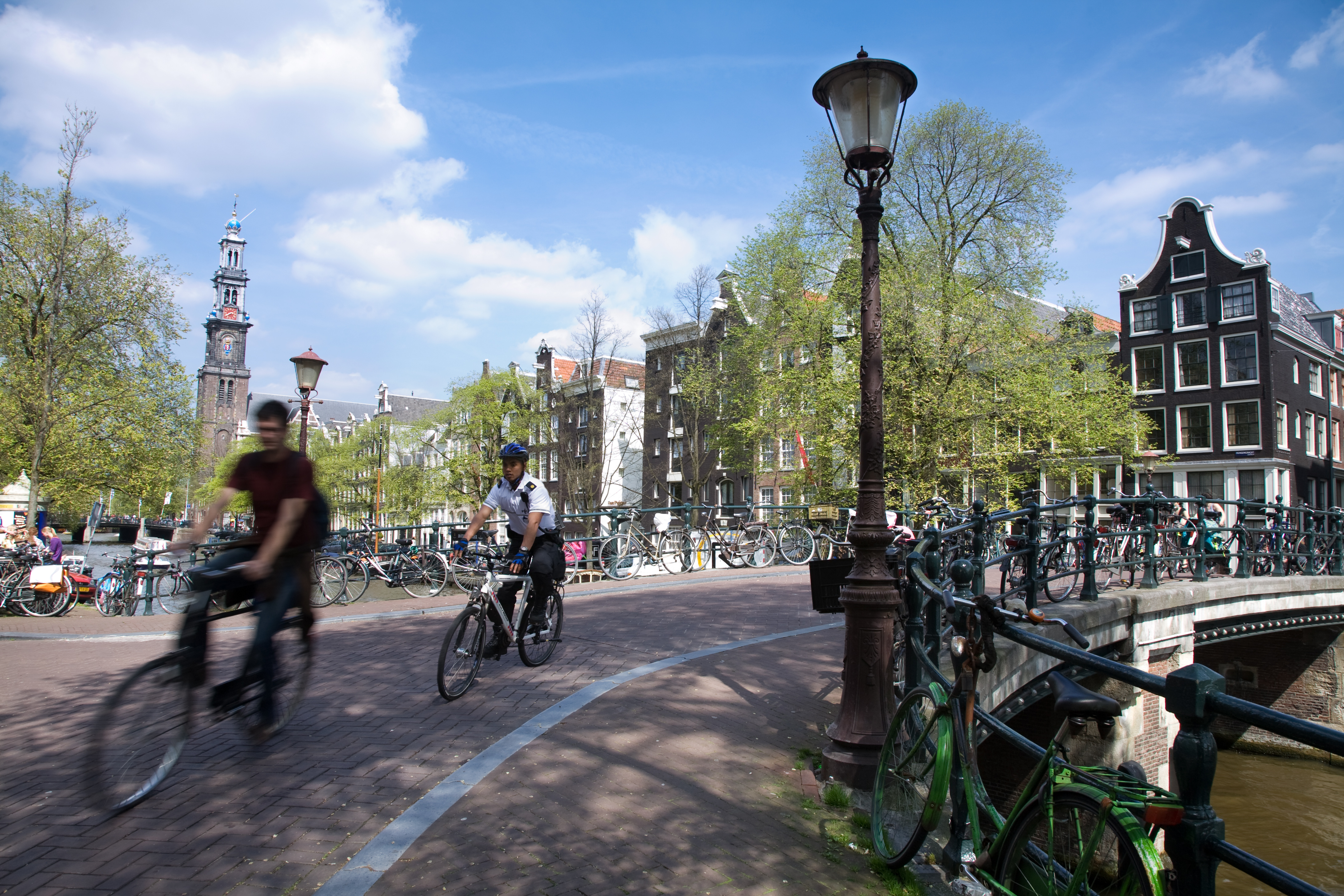
Riding in Amsterdam

Amsterdam is well known as one of the most bicycle-friendly cities, with high levels of bicycle infrastructure, planning and funding, tourism—as well as high levels of bike theft, safety concerns and overcrowding in places.

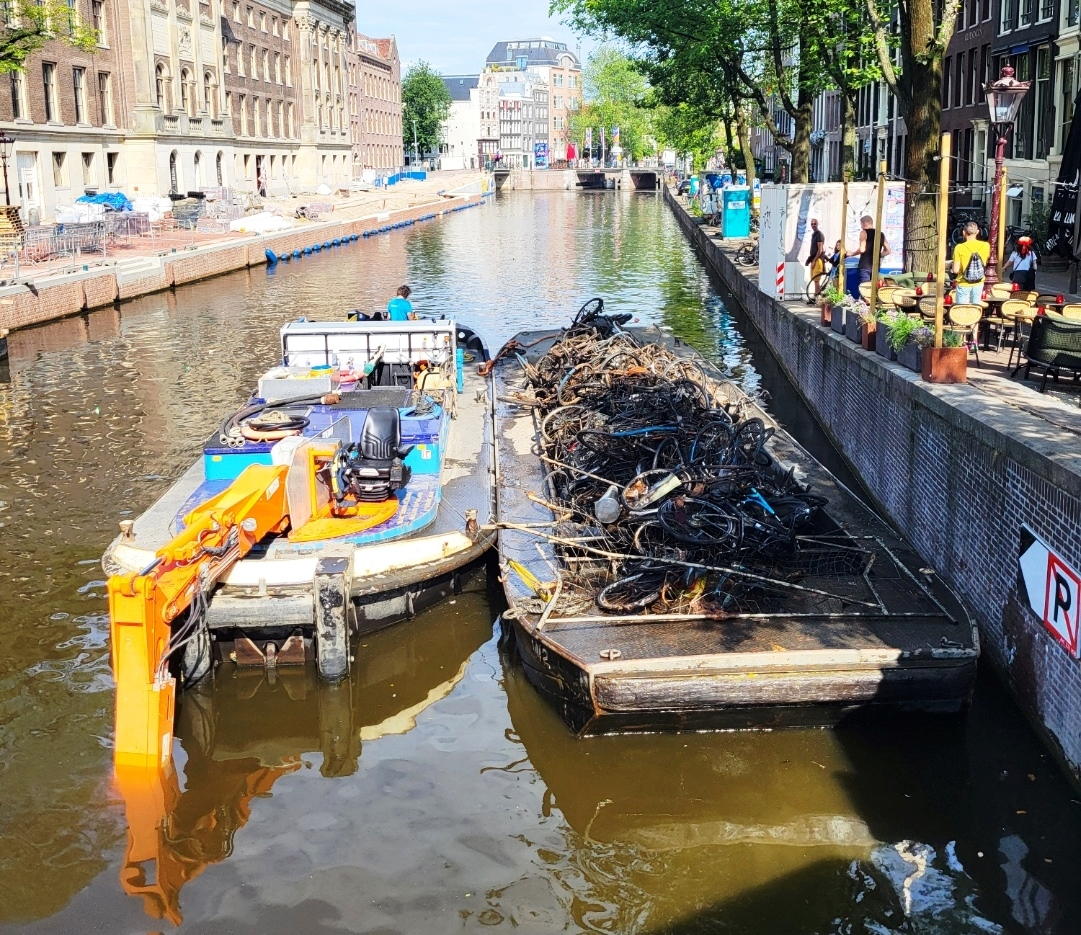
Barges regularly pull bicycles from the bottom of the canals in Amsterdam

Though considered one of the best-known centers of bicycle culture worldwide, numerous other cities in the Netherlands and globally outrank Amsterdam in bike-friendliness, including The Hague, Eindhoven and Almere, which were nominated for the Fietsstad 2014 awards. The city of Groningen won the award in 2001.

== Background ==
As is common in Dutch cities, Amsterdam has a wide network of traffic-calmed streets and facilities for cyclists, including bike paths, bike racks, and guarded bicycle parking stations (Fietsenstalling), the latter available for a fee. According to the most recent figures published by Central Bureau of Statistics (CBS), in 2015 the 442,693 households (850,000 residents) in Amsterdam altogether owned 847,000 bicycles—or 1.91 bicycles per household.

Bicycles are used by all socio-economic groups because of their convenience, Amsterdam's small size, the 400 km of bike paths, the flat terrain, and the arguable inconvenience of driving an automobile: driving a car is discouraged, parking fees are expensive, and many streets are closed to cars or are one-way for motor vehicle traffic (but not for cyclists). Amsterdam's bike paths (Fietspad) are red in colour, in order to differentiate them from both the road ways and footpaths.

Amsterdammers ride a wide variety of bicycles including the traditional Omafiets—the ubiquitous Dutch roadster with a step-through frame—to anything from modern city bikes, road bikes, mountain bikes, and even recumbent bikes.

Many tourists get around Amsterdam by bike, following the Dutch custom. Bicycle tour groups offer guided bike tours through the city. Bicycle traffic, in fact traffic in general, is relatively safe: in 2007, Amsterdam had 18 traffic deaths, of all types, in total.

Bike traffic has a 38% modal share.

Bicycle theft in Amsterdam is widespread: in 2005, about 54,000 bicycles were stolen, and every year between 12,000 and 15,000 bicycles are retrieved from the canals.

== History ==
Amsterdam has addressed automobile-dependency radically and aggressively, by sharply inhibiting car access and expanding availability and convenience of public transportation;— while being transparent in its aim to be an eco-friendly city. Roughly, two-thirds of daily urban transportation is by bicycle, while 19 percent is by car. Amsterdam's ultimate goal is to become a car-free and zero-emissions city by making it harder and less convenient to use automobiles. This will be done by making central roads through-routes, using one-way systems, narrowing roads and creating barriers.

Initiatives are taken by the city of Amsterdam itself, by the alderperson and city hall, encouraging riders to use public transportation by running the Metro on weekends all night and be free for children under the age of 12. Urban planning and smart city planning often face the issue of cost. However, the Netherlands' government is being cost-efficient by using street-design tool "knip", making cuts. They are closing roads for cars and opening them to two-wheels and pedestrians, and creating space for sweeping squares, especially around big public spaces like a train station. Also, the city encourages the use of public transportation and drop-off taxis by slowly decreasing the number of parking spots. The government is pushing to reform the use of public transportation and make drivers give up their keys to reduce the number of cars on the roads in Amsterdam, hence reducing the CO_{2} emissions from gasoline. On top of all the efforts done by the legislation, the government is opening their City Data to the public online for free and easy access for its citizens; creating honest transparency with their people. Amsterdam is creating municipal policies under government-citizen transparency to become a smart city and to adapt to the growing urban sprawl happening globally.

== Issues ==
By 2012, cycling in Amsterdam had grown tremendously in popularity — up by some 40% in the previous twenty years. The city had 490,000 fietsers (cyclists) take to the road to cycle 2 million kilometres every day according to statistics of the city council. This has caused some problems as, despite 35,000 kilometers of bicycle paths, the country's 18 million bicycles (1.3 per citizen old enough to ride) were clogging Amsterdam's streets at peak times and parked bicycles were overcrowding train stations and other areas. This is being addressed by building even more bike lanes and bicycle parking stations with much greater capacity to tackle a problem many other cities in the world would envy, that of bicycle traffic congestion.

== Gallery ==
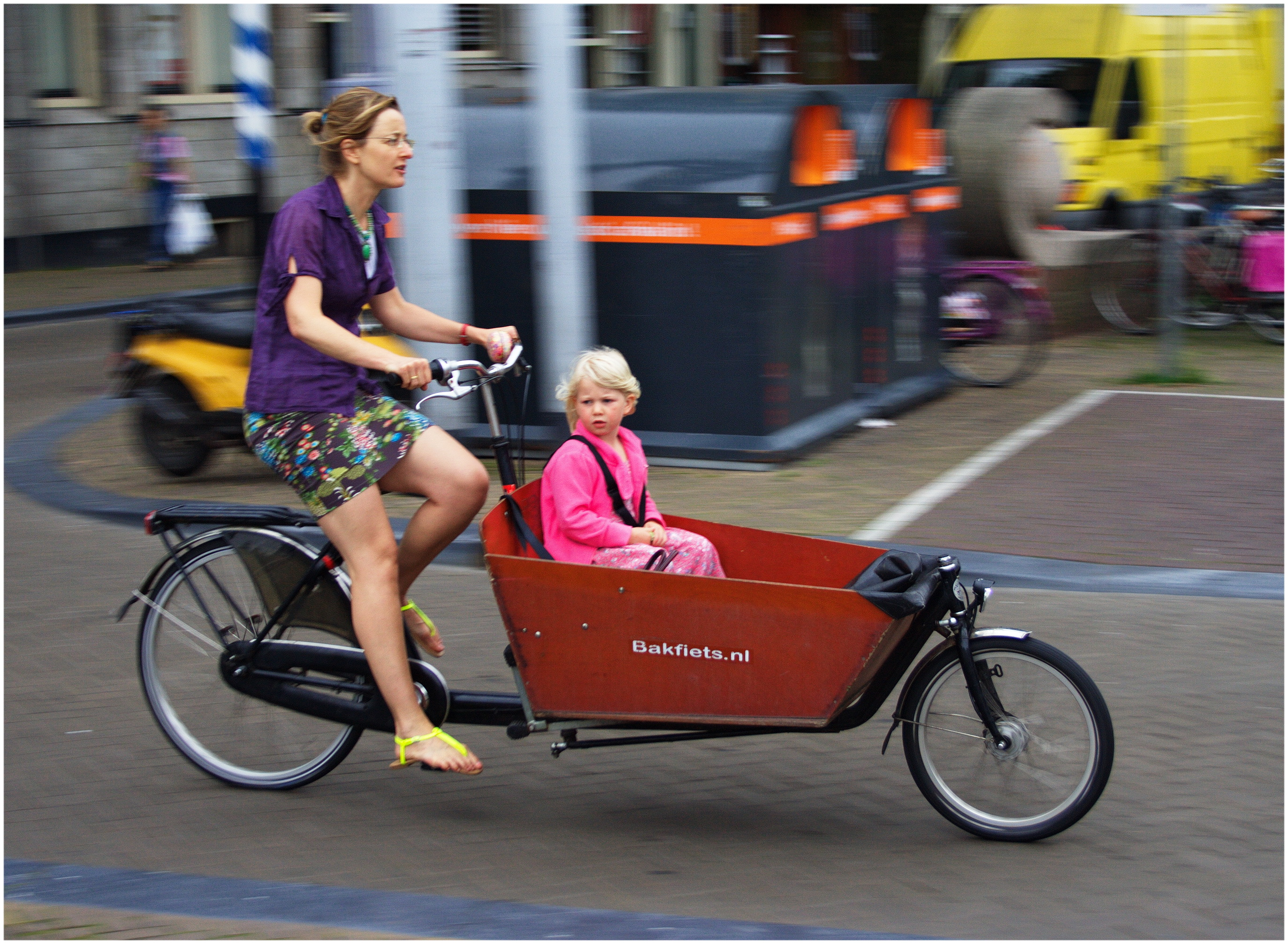
Mother and child on a bakfiets

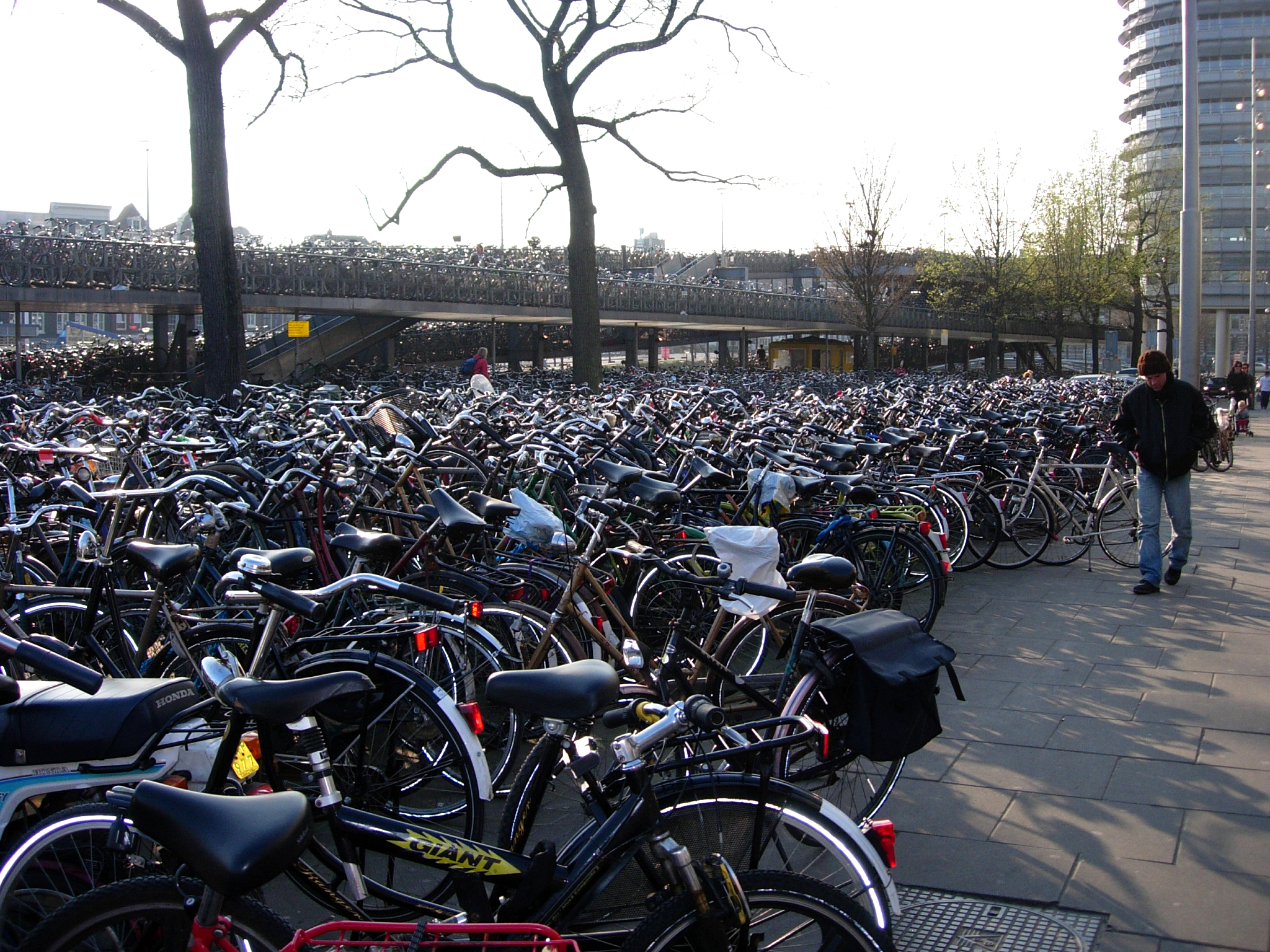
Centraal Station's Fietsflat parking facility, closed in 2023

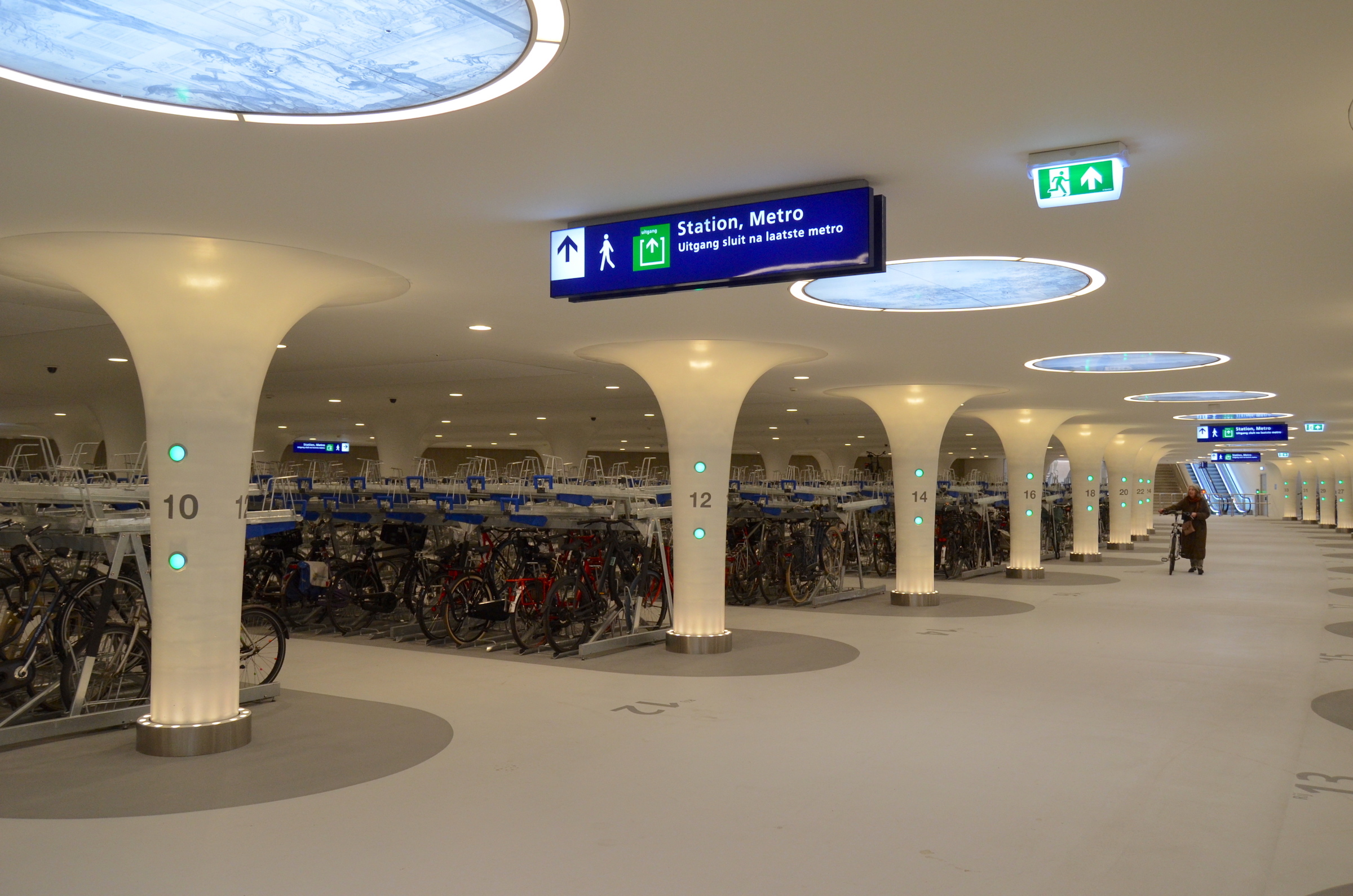
The new underwater parking garage at Centraal Station, which can accommodate 7,000 bicycles

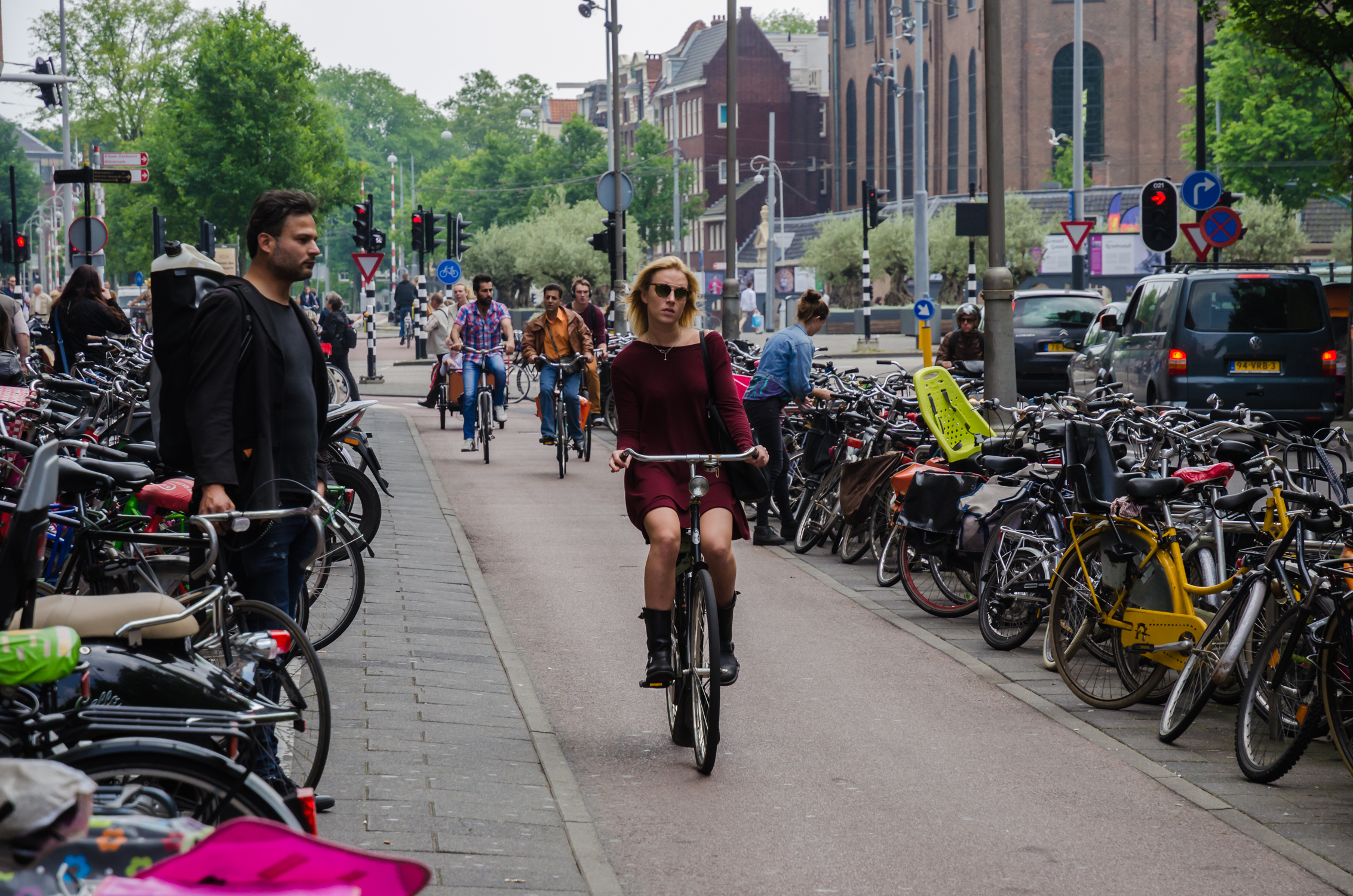
Cycle path flanked by parked bicycles on Jodenbreestraat

Bicycles in Amsterdam on a summer's day

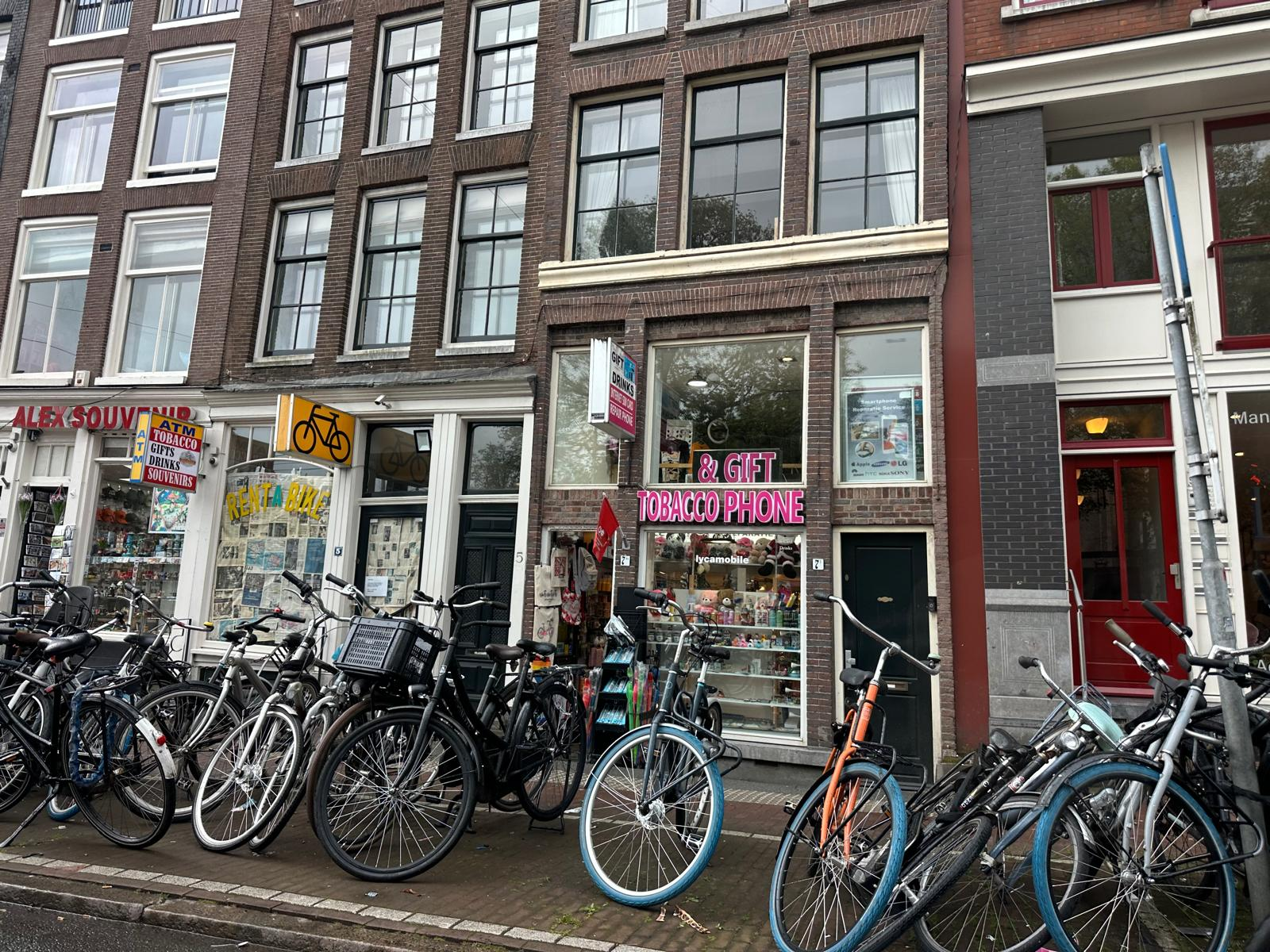
Bicycles parked in Amsterdam

== See also ==
- Fietsersbond
- Outline of cycling
- Not Just Bikes
