= Dutch Cycling Embassy =

- Formation: 2011; 15 years ago
- Headquarters: Netherlands
- Key people: Skadi Tirpak (managing director)
- Website: https://dutchcycling.nl

The Dutch Cycling Embassy is a public-private bicycle organisation based in the Netherlands established to promote cycling abroad.

The organization is funded by the Government of the Netherlands, and organizes workshops and tours for visitors from cities around the world to educate and support them in adopting best practice Dutch safe cycling infrastructure.

== Background ==
Prior to the oil shocks of the 1970s, cities in the Netherlands were predominantly car-centric. Following the death of a child after a car accident, a campaign called Stop de kindermoord (Stop the child murder) was established in 1973. This campaign helped to improve and spread safe cycling infrastructure nationwide.

The Dutch Cycling Embassy was founded in 2011 in response to increase demand for Netherlands-style cycling infrastructure internationally.

== See also ==
- Cycling in the Netherlands
