= David Hembrow =

Dutch cycling advocate

David Hembrow is a British-Dutch cycling advocate who resides in Assen, Netherlands. In his English-language blog, A View from the Cycle Path, he describes how the Dutch cycling infrastructure works, how it has become the best in the world, and how this infrastructure encourages the Netherlands to have highest level of cycling mode share in the world. His blog has become quite influential in the world of cycling advocacy.

Hembrow is very critical of what he sees poorly executed attempts in his home country of the UK to make cycling in London and in other towns and cities safe. He also sees these attempts as being far too slowly implemented to allow British cycling infrastructure to remotely catch up to anywhere near to even the poorest-serviced Dutch cities in terms of cycling infrastructure.

Hembrow and his family moved from Cambridge, England (where he was once heavily involved in the Cambridge Cycling Campaign) to the Netherlands in 2007 so that they could live in a bicycle-friendly environment. He used to conduct study tours to show people the cycling infrastructure of the Netherlands but no longer offers them because of the environmental impact of international travel.

== See also ==
- Cycling in the Netherlands
- Bicycle advocacy
