= Fietsflat =

Free bicycle parking facility in Amsterdam

Coordinates: 52°22′45″N 4°53′49″E

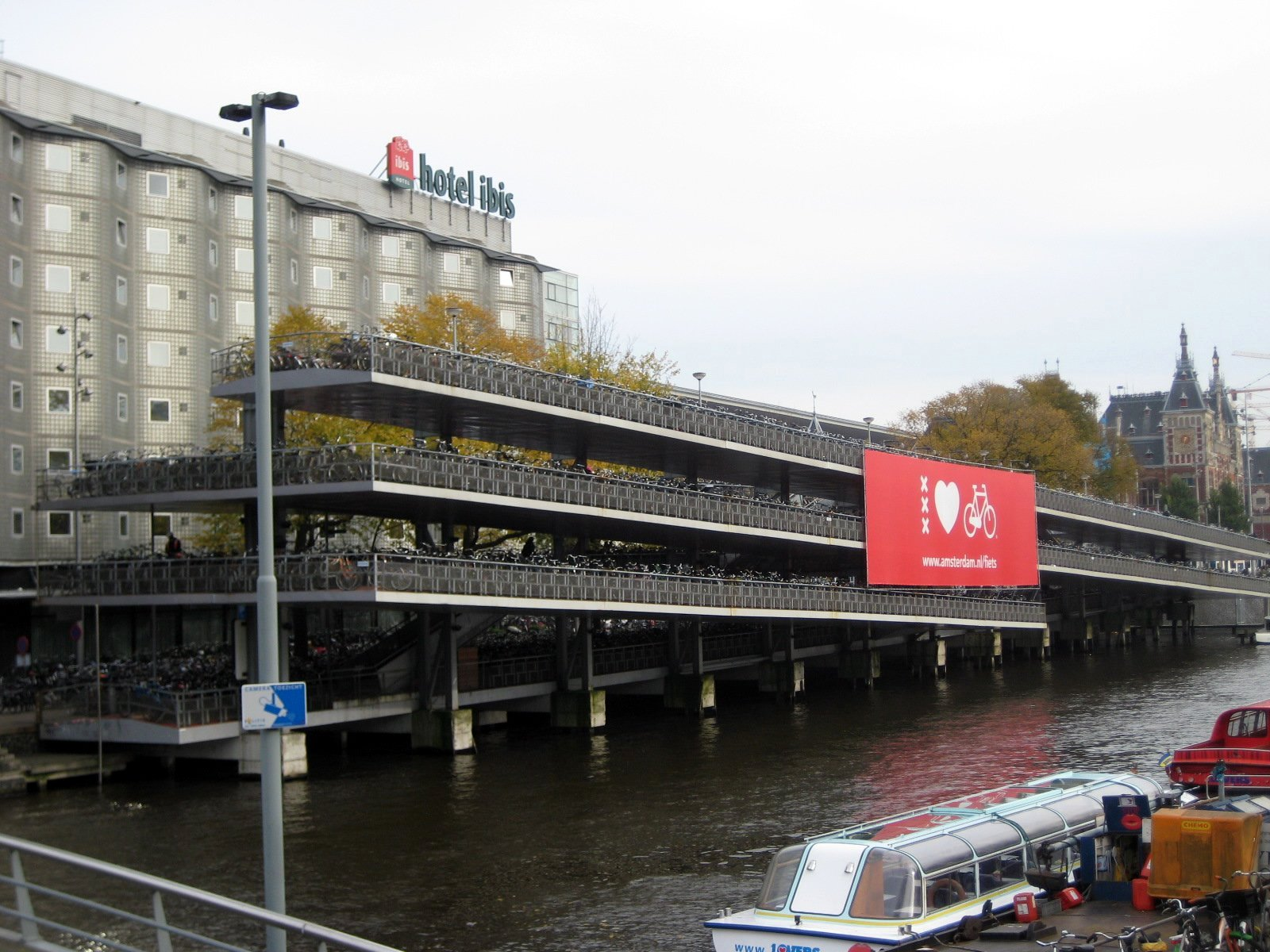
- The Fietsflat pictured in 2013
- Interactive map of the Fietsflat area

General information
- Architectural style: utilitarian
- Location: Stationseiland, Amsterdam, Netherlands
- Opened: 2 April 2001
- Closed: January 2023
- Owner: Gemeente Amsterdam

Technical details
- Floor count: 3

Design and construction
- Architect: VMX Architecten

The Fietsflat was a 3-storey free-to-use public bicycle parking facility in Amsterdam. It was located on Stationseiland next to Amsterdam Central Station and could accommodate 2500 bicycles. The name is derived from fiets (bicycle) and flat, an English loanword used in Dutch to denote multi-level apartment complexes.

It closed in January 2023, alongside the opening of the nearby underwater Stationsplein bicycle parking facility, which has a capacity of 7,000 bicycles. An attempt to sell the Fietsflat to Schiphol Airport failed, as moving it there proved to be too complex and expensive. In April 2025, the municipality decided to demolish the parking facility. The demolition began on 24 November 2025 and was due to be completed in February 2026.

== History ==
The Fietsflat was opened on 5 April 2001 in the presence of Frank Köhler, alderman for traffic and transport of the City of Amsterdam. The bike parking facility was designed to be only temporary, needed during construction works around the Central Station area. It was to be closed in 2004, but remained open due to high demand of parking spaces. New proposals to close the structure in 2009 failed as well.

In the summer of 2017 the structure underwent renovations. The Fietsflat closed in January 2023, after an underground bicycle parking garage with a capacity of 7,000 bicycles was opened on the front side of the station. The flat was not demolished, but kept in reserve. It could be opened again, if it takes too long to construct the newest east side garage, with a capacity of 8,800 bicycles plus 450 OV-fietsen.

== Design ==
The Fietsflat was designed by VMX Architecten. The structure was 100 metres long, 14 metres wide and 3 storeys tall. Because the facility was so long and high, bicycle traffic was permitted throughout. During the design process the designers had to keep a couple of strict preconditions in mind. The structure could not damage or otherwise penetrate the then newly renovated quay on which is resided. Canal boats also had to be able make turns in the Open Havenfront basin. To meet security needs, the structure was designed as transparently as possible. The floors were inclined, which helped to keep unwanted people out as it was not comfortable to stay in for a longer amount of time. To ensure safety there was security personnel on site 24/7. The design was nominated for the NAi Architectuurprijs award in 2001.

== Expansion ==
There were plans to build a second, identical, Fietsflat on the IJ side of Amsterdam Central Station due to open in September of 2006. In April of that year, the City Council did not approve of the 4 million euro budget. They opted for more flexible, faster and cheaper solutions with temporary parking spots on several locations, including pontoons and ferries.

In 2014 the city approved a large new underground bicycle parking facility underneath the Open Havenfront at Prins Hendrikkade, right opposite the Fietsflat. In 2017 the City approved a large new underground garage in the IJ at the backside of Centraal Station. The underwater bicycle parking facility at Prins Hendrikkade, which was opened in January 2023, has a capacity of 7,000 bicycles, and by 2030 there are expected to be a total of 21,500 parking spots around Amsterdam Central Station.
