= Cycling advocacy =

Activities promoting cycling

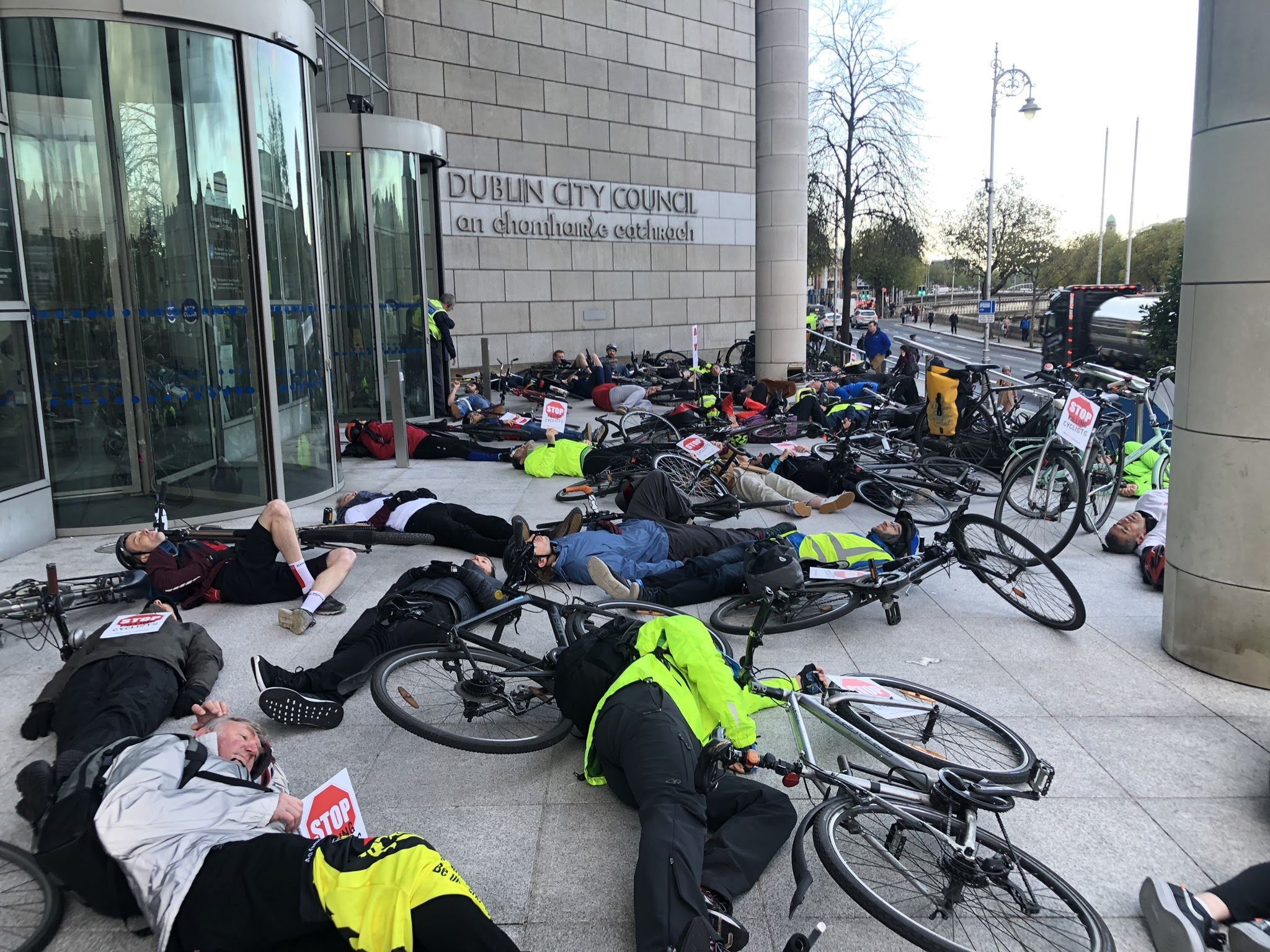
Die-in by I BIKE Dublin at Dublin City Council, 2019, in Dublin

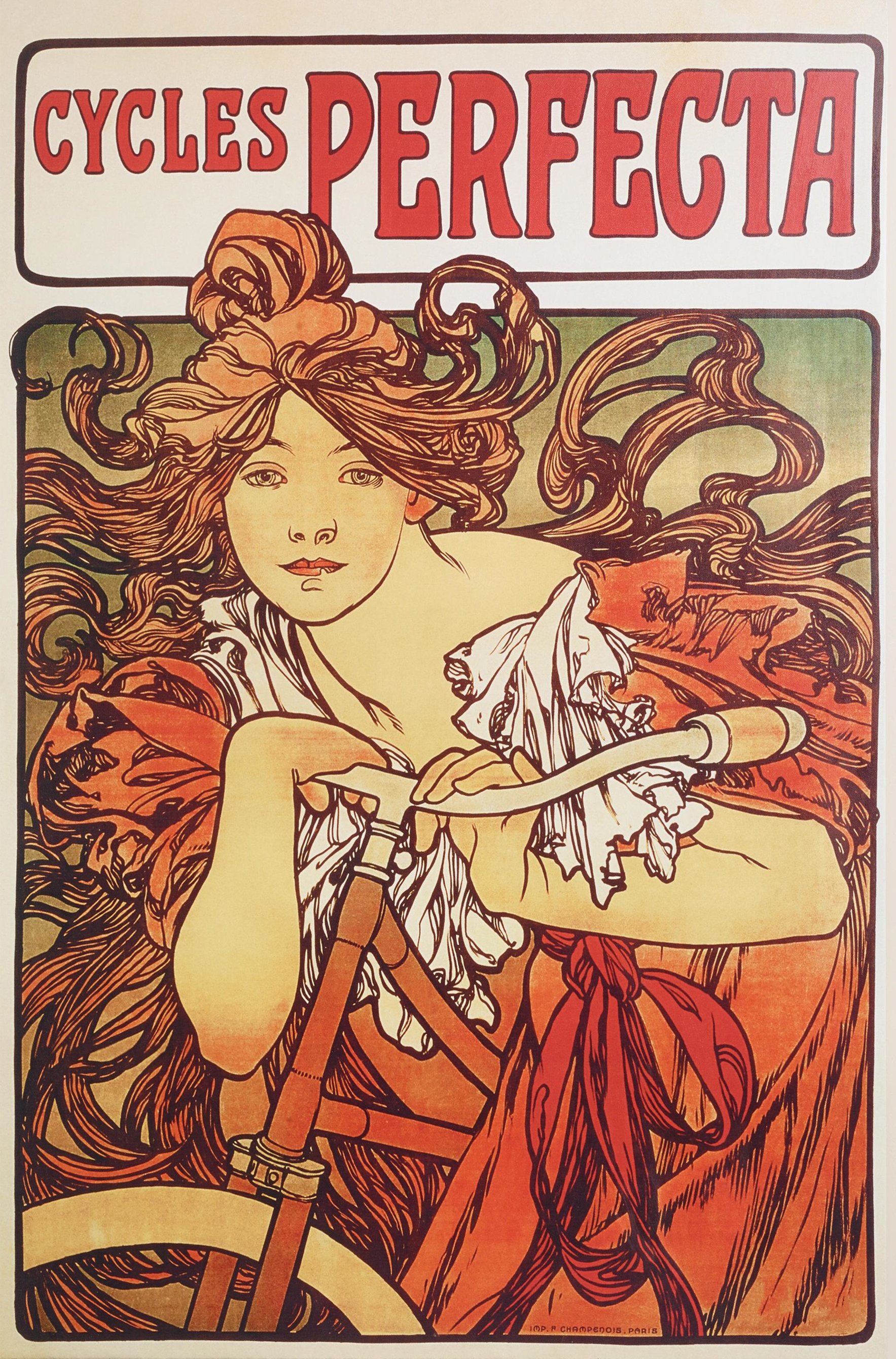
Alphonse Mucha (1902) Advertising poster for Cycles Perfecta

Cycling advocacy consists of activities that call for, promote or enable increased adoption and support for cycling and improved safety and convenience for cyclists, usually within urbanized areas or semi-urban regions. Issues of concern typically include policy, administrative and legal changes (the consideration of cycling in all governance); advocating and establishing better cycling infrastructure (including road and junction design and the creation, maintenance of bike lanes and separate bike paths, and bike parking); public education regarding the health, transportational and environmental benefits of cycling for both individuals and communities, cycling and motoring skills; and increasing public and political support for bicycling.

There are many organisations worldwide whose primary mission is to advocate these goals. Most are non-profit organisations supported by donations, membership dues, and volunteers.

== Cycling advocacy around the world ==
=== Internationally ===
In 2018 the United Nations General Assembly designated 3 June as World Bicycle Day, after it had been proposed by World Cycling Alliance.

=== Europe ===
==== Bicycle embassies ====
In Europe, Bicycle embassies have been set up to communicate established bodies of knowledge concerning cycling infrastructure, bicycle promotion and cycling advocacy techniques to other national, state and municipal governments.

Established bicycle embassies include the Dutch Cycling Embassy, the Cycling Embassy of Denmark and the Cycling Embassy of Great Britain.

==== Copenhagenization ====
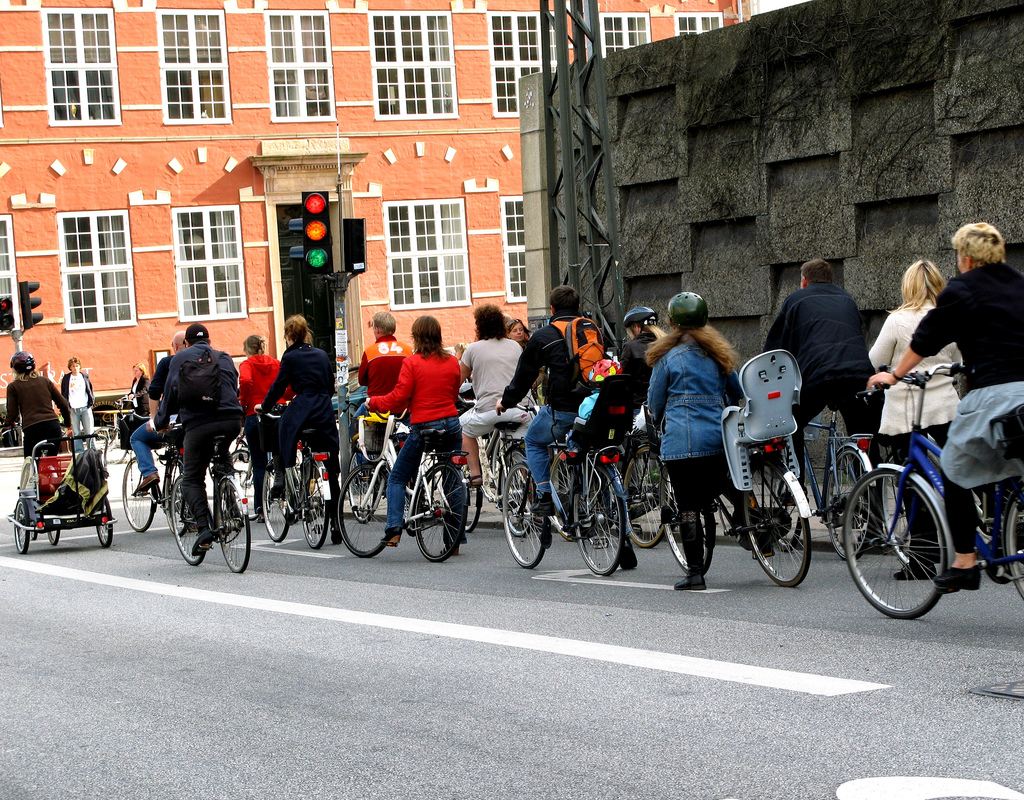
Rush hour cycle traffic in Copenhagen

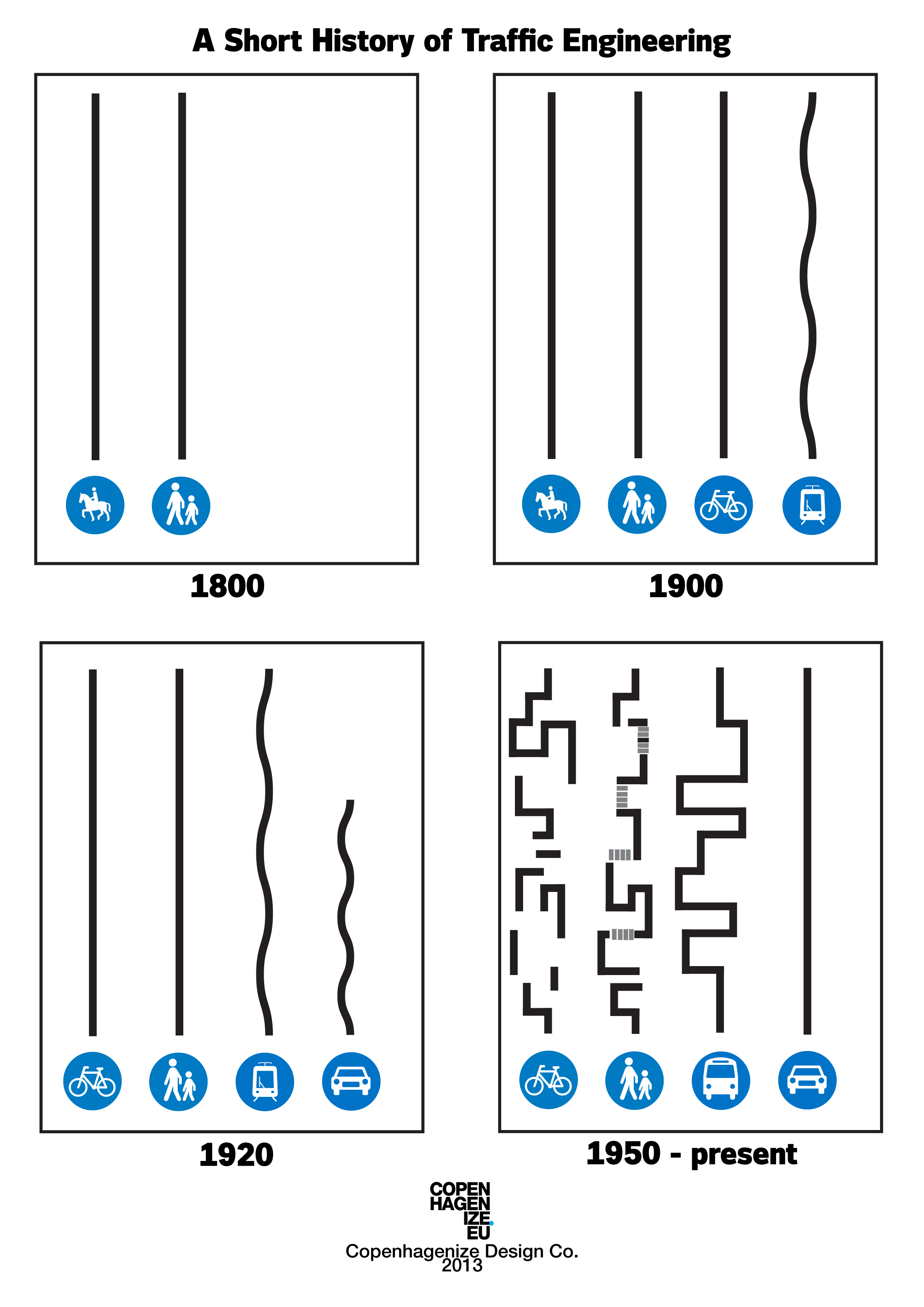
Copenhagenize advocacy poster

Copenhagenization is a design strategy in which urban planning and design are centered on making a city more accessible to bicyclists and pedestrians and less car dependent.

The term was popularised by Danish urban design consultant Jan Gehl, who has been instrumental in the promotion and implementation of the policy in Copenhagen.

For more than 40 years, Mr. Gehl has systematically studied public spaces to see how they really work, using Strøget and Copenhagen as a laboratory for his research. He has advised cities around the world, including Melbourne, London and New York, on how to improve the quality of urban life—in his words, how to "Copenhagenize" their cities.

Independently of Gehl, Danish urban design consultant Mikael Colville-Andersen coined and popularized the phrase the term in this meaning to a broader audience, starting in 2007 with the Copenhagenize.com blog', that highlights how the bicycle can be an important tool in the creation of liveable cities. The term has since spread to Britain, to Europe, and elsewhere internationally. The Copenhagenize.com blog has inspired the creation of other blogs with the same focus for cities such as Amsterdam, Portland, Lisbon, Hamburg and Munich.

==== Ireland ====
In Ireland the direct action group, I BIKE Dublin advocates for improved conditions for cycling in Dublin through direct action campaigns.

=== North America ===
In North America the term Bicycle Ambassador arose to describe cycling advocates tasked with promoting bicycling in a community. Such advocates can be employed by the national, provincial or city government and their tasks include networking extensively with other municipal offices whose activities effect cycling.

Early Bicycle Ambassador programs began in Toronto in the late 1990s. Other cities picked it up over the following decade, Chicago being the largest. Portland, Oregon, San Francisco, California, Seattle, Washington, and Arlington, Virginia, also have programs. Philadelphia, Washington, D.C., and New York City began programs most recently. Some programs are entirely youth focused, while others become a de facto part of the city Department of Transportation or other government agency.

Local cycling advocacy groups include community bicycle collectives such as the Iowa City Bike Library, which combines bicycle access, repair education, and advocacy.

=== Latin America ===
The World Bike Forum was organized in 2012 after the Critical Mass events in Porto Alegre in which an automobile driver deliberately collided with and injured around 20 cyclists. During the Forum bicycle-based urban mobility is discussed and strategies to spread the use of bicycles in the hosting city are promoted.

The Forum has taken place in the Southern Brazil cities of Porto Alegre (2012 and 2013), Curitiba (2014), as well as Medellín, Colombia (2015) and Mexico City in 2017.

=== Asia ===
==== Thailand ====
Thailand has a plethora of bicycle advocacy groups including Thai Cycling Club, the Thai Cycling for Health Association, and the Bangkok Bicycle Campaign. These advocacy groups participate in activities such as campaigning, influencing cycling policy outcomes, leading political discussions, organize events, and conduct cycling related research.

The Thailand Bike and Walk Forum was formed by the Thai Cycling Club (TCC) and the Thailand Walking and Cycling Institute Foundation (TWCI) in 2013. The forum meets annually to bring attention to cycling and walking as viable solutions to global issues including health-related and environmentally-related issues.

==== The Philippines ====
The World Cycling Alliance, a global cycling advocacy group, founded an NGO in 2000 in the Philippines called the Firefly Brigade. The Firefly Brigade's mission is to promote cycling and to empower to citizens to get involved in cycling advocacy.

=== Africa ===
==== Lebogang Mokwena ====
Lebogang Mokwena is a Bicycle Mayor for Cape Town. She contributed to an event called 'Co-create My City', an information exchange between South Africa and the Netherlands. She spoke on topics including how cycling can break down racial barriers and offer citizens unique perspectives of their cities.

== List of cycling advocacy groups and individuals ==
Among the world's best known cycling advocates are:

- Richard Ballantine
- David Byrne
- Mikael Colville-Andersen
- John Forester
- Jan Gehl

Major cycle advocacy groups include:

- European Cyclists' Federation, ECF, where most of the European national cyclists' federations and many worldwide are members
- Cycling Embassy of Denmark
- London Cycling Campaign, based in London (12,000 memberships, 2015)
- Bicycle Network, located in Australia and one of the largest cycling membership organisations in the world (45,000 members, 2015)

== See also ==
- Bicycle culture
- Bicycle law
- Bicycle parking
- Bicycle transportation planning and engineering
- Bicycle-friendly
- Cyclability
- Outline of cycling
- Safety of cycling infrastructure
- Street reclamation
- Urban vitality
- Utility cycling

=== Bicycle advocacy groups, movements and regional examples ===
- Active Transportation Alliance
- Bicycle Coalition of Greater Philadelphia
- Critical Mass
- Cycling in Copenhagen
- Time's Up!
- Fietsersbond Dutch Cyclist Union

=== Films and other media ===
- Pedaling to Freedom
- With My Own Two Wheels
- Bikes vs Cars
- Ovarian Psycos

=== Bicycle advocacy in the developing world ===
- World Bicycle Relief
- World Cycling Alliance

=== Similar urban design concepts ===
- New Pedestrianism)
- Walkability
