= Conflicts involving Critical Mass =

Overview of the various conflicts during notable Critical Mass events

There have been many conflicts during Critical Mass events since the founding of the worldwide bicycling advocacy event in 1992. The conflicts have resulted in injuries, property damage, and arrests, and both bicyclists and motorized vehicle drivers have been victims. Critics say that Critical Mass, held primarily in large metropolitan cities, is a deliberate attempt to obstruct automotive traffic and disrupt normal city functions, when individuals taking part refuse to obey traffic laws, while participants variously consider it a celebration of cycling, of cyclists' rights, and a practical re-imagining of urban space. The event is large, occurs monthly or weekly, and happens in over 300 cities.

== Berkeley, California, US ==
On May 11, 2007, an incident occurred in Berkeley, California, when an elderly motorist stopped at an intersection with dozens of bicycles crossing. Activists claim that the driver shouted, while bicyclists were in the intersection, "I'm sick of you people!" Police have not determined who had the right-of-way. The driver attempted to drive through the intersection. The motorist and his wife, two witnesses, and the police all claimed that the cyclists threw their bicycles under the vehicle. This was disputed by other witnesses. Critical Mass participants then rocked the vehicle, pounded the hood, and broke the windshield while verbally abusing the elderly couple. Approximately $3,000 worth of damage was done to the bicycles. Berkeley police did not make any arrests in the incident.

== Buenos Aires, Argentina ==
On March 28, 2013, in Buenos Aires, Argentina, a taxi driver ran over a group of Critical Mass riders, injuring 2 cyclists, before fleeing from the scene.

== Buffalo, New York, US ==
On May 30, 2003, in Buffalo, New York, during an incident known locally as "Critical Massacre," police stopped two cyclists for "failure to yield to an emergency vehicle." Several people were allegedly attacked by police. Nine cyclists were arrested and three were later convicted, including a journalist.

== Chicago, Illinois, US ==
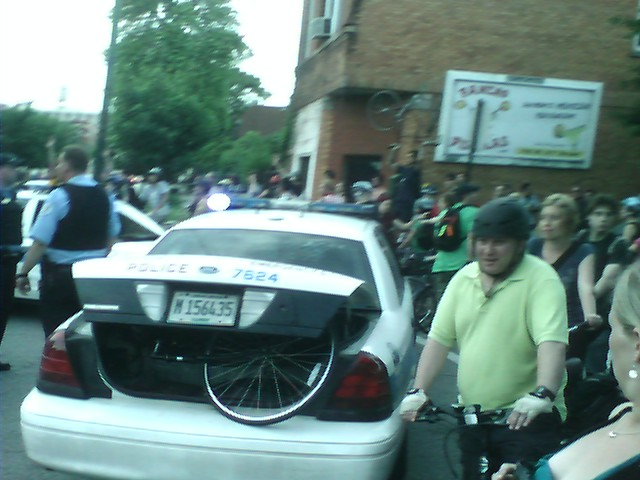
A cyclist at the June 27, 2008 Chicago Critical Mass is arrested for public drinking.

Chicago Police Department officers are often seen riding with Critical Mass participants, and squad cars block intersections to provide safe passage to Critical Mass cyclists. However, on August 31, 2007, seven riders were arrested on charges of obstructing traffic and disobeying police, and were held overnight. According to some of those arrested, they were released late at night or early in the morning. On multiple occasions, Critical Mass participants attempted to ride on Lake Shore Drive, a road off limits to cyclists. Police prevented participants riding on Lake Shore Drive, by blocking entrance ramps with squad cars when Critical Mass riders approached the road.

== Honolulu, Hawaii, US ==
At dusk on March 28, 2008, in Honolulu, Hawaii, police collided with a young woman on a bicycle while trying to stop another bicyclist for traffic infractions. The young woman fell and hit her head on the ground, sustaining injuries requiring hospitalization. While no arrests were made, the police did issue citations and confiscated bicycles.

== Houston, Texas, US ==
Due to the gradual increase of cyclists participating in Critical Mass, as well as complaints from motorists and concerns for safety, Houston Police Department officers helped direct the October 2013 Critical Mass ride in Houston, Texas by controlling intersections on the bike route. In January 2014, after two months of providing free security and safe passage through heavy intersections, the Houston Police Department began considering options to charge the group for providing security for the event, citing similarities to providing security for funeral processions through the city limits. Some Critical Mass riders have spoken out in protest of paying a fee to utilize extra security and escorting through busy intersections, while many others support paying fees for extra security to keep the ride safe, which has led to increased discussions between the city and group for additional alternatives to the building conflicts.

== London, United Kingdom ==
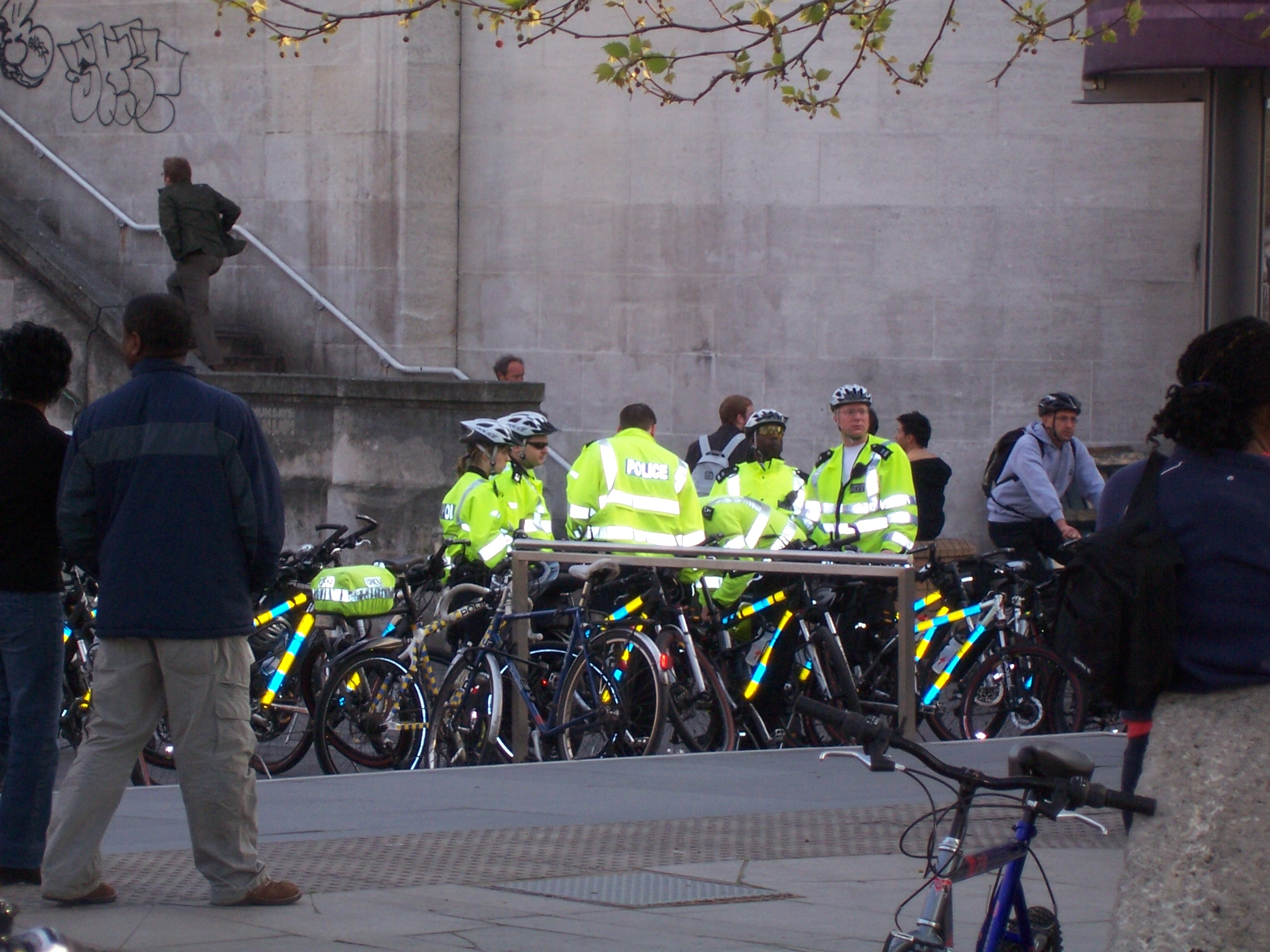
Metropolitan Police officers with their cycles awaiting the start of Critical Mass London, April 2006.

In London in September 2005, a few weeks after the 7 July 2005 bombings, Metropolitan Police required the organisers to provide a route six days before the event and placed strict restrictions on riders, under threat of arrest. The threat was retracted when politicians and cyclist groups objected. In October 2005, the ride had close to 1,200 participants, significantly more than usual. A long stop in Parliament Square, part of the government's exclusion area in the Serious Organised Crime and Police Act 2005, led to a slow and cumbersome ride.

One participant sought a declaration from the High Court of England and Wales that police need not be notified about the rides, in a "friendly action" in which neither side sought damages. The High Court agreed, exempting Critical Mass from notification under Section 11 of the Public Order Act 1986. The ruling was reversed on appeal. In 2008, Friends of the Earth, who supported the legal action, said the case would be appealed to England's highest legal authority, the House of Lords, on the grounds that, after 11 years, Critical Mass is "commonly or customarily held." In October 2008, the House of Lords ruled in favour of the Critical Mass participant.

During the 2012 Summer Olympics, cyclists were arrested on opening day after police claim they ignored regulations in place during the Olympics. Jenny Jones of the Green Party and the Greater London Assembly has questioned the police actions, calling them "out of all proportion to common sense" and "tragically unnecessary." A Critical Mass website asked riders to be "peacefully assertive" during the monthly ride, while police claim they asked riders to keep to the south of the River Thames. When the riders got close to the Olympic Park, police began to cordon off the area and arrest riders. In total, 182 people were arrested, of whom 4 were charged, and 178 were bailed pending further inquiries. The action led to 5 of the 182 people arrested being convicted in court.

== Minneapolis, Minnesota, US ==
On the August 31, 2007, ride in Minneapolis, Minnesota, a confrontation occurred between cyclists and the police. The police presence included undercover officers, three marked squad cars, a state patrol helicopter, and unmarked vehicles. The ride had been linked with weekend protests of the following year's Republican National Convention. After the arrest of a cyclist for "riding in a snake-like manner," cyclists began chanting "Let him go!" and "What's the charge?" The police called for backup, and dozens of police officers responded, using mace and tasers. Minneapolis police arrested 19 participants, including three minors. The adults were arrested on suspicion of rioting, a gross misdemeanor.

== Minsk, Belarus ==
On May 27, 2011, in Minsk, Belarus, police forces aided by special units transported 13 cyclists to the police station for violation of traffic rules and for not following orders to disband. Detained participants were fingerprinted and fined, then released.

On April 30, 2016, two cyclists were arrested during a Critical Mass action. As of September 2016, one was released and the other is facing trial.

== New York City, New York, US ==
Police in New York City have claimed that Critical Mass bicyclists blocking intersections to allow bikes to pass may delay emergency vehicles in the gridlock.

=== 2004 Republican National Convention ===
During the US 2004 Republican National Convention, police arrested 250 riders after the ride caused "massive disruptions" in the city. Many court cases resulted regarding the legality of the ride, whether police have the right to arrest cyclists and seize bicycles, and whether the event needs a permit. In December 2004, a federal judge dismissed New York City's injunction against Critical Mass as a "political event." On March 23, 2005, the city filed a lawsuit seeking to prevent Time's Up!, a direct action environmental group, from promoting or advertising Critical Mass rides. The lawsuit also stated that Time's Up! and the public could not ride or gather at a Critical Mass bike ride, claiming a permit was required.

=== 2008 bicycle rally ===
During a bicycle rally on July 25, 2008, NYPD patrolman Patrick Pogan pushed rider Christopher Long off his bicycle. In a criminal complaint, Pogan wrote that he had ordered Long to stop because he was weaving in and out of traffic, forcing vehicles to swerve or stop, and generally disrupting the normal flow of traffic. In addition, Pogan wrote that he suffered lacerations on his arms because Long steered his bike into him and knocked him down, and when he tried to place Long under arrest, Long began flailing, kicking and screaming, "You are pawns in the game!" Long spent the next day in police custody on charges of attempted assault, resisting arrest and disorderly conduct.

Within days, members of the rally's sponsoring organization Time's Up! posted a video of the incident on YouTube. The video went viral and received over 400,000 hits within five days. Critical Mass activists claimed it supported their claims that the police department has demonstrated a pattern of arresting participants in the rally on false charges. Witnesses also disputed Pogan's account, saying that Long was the one to receive injuries, traffic was stopped for the rally, and that Pogan had simply scanned the group of cyclists to find one he could take down.

The union that represents NYPD officers said Pogan was just doing his job to protect the public from a reckless bike rider, and Pogan's father — himself a retired NYPD detective — defended him, saying "You gotta do what you gotta do to make an arrest." The prosecutor's office dismissed the charges against Long. NYPD placed Pogan, who had spent only three weeks as a police officer, on a desk assignment while the city investigated the incident.

On December 16, 2008, Pogan appeared in court and pleaded not guilty to felony charges of falsifying business records and filing a false instrument, and misdemeanor charges of third-degree assault, second-degree harassment and making a punishable false written statement. After the indictment, the police department suspended Pogan and, two months later, Pogan resigned as the department prepared to fire him. His attorney said that his defense would center on the department's training procedures and claims that events occurring off-camera needed to be taken into account.

On July 8, 2009, it was reported that Long, then a Hoboken, NJ, resident, was suing the New York Police Department for $1.5 million, alleging that Pogan falsified his arrest report in order to legitimize his assault on Long.

During his trial in April 2010, Pogan acknowledged that the video looked "very extreme." He testified that he had anticipated a collision with Long, since the rider lowered his right shoulder as the officer approached. Jurors found Pogan not guilty of harassment and assault and acquitted him of four of the seven counts of which he had been charged. He was found guilty of filing a criminal complaint that contained false statements concerning the cyclist. Pogan received no jail time but, because he is a convicted felon, he is not eligible to become a New York City police officer in the future. Long said in an interview that he was pleased with the verdict, in part because it would prevent Pogan from becoming a New York City police officer again.

== Oakland, California, US ==
On September 9, 2022, in Oakland, California, during the monthly East Bay Bike Party two cyclists were struck by a west-bound gray sedan as they were traveling east on Alcatraz Avenue. According to witnesses, a few minutes prior to the collisions, a different car had driven in the opposite lane to bypass slow-moving cars and bicyclists. This move forced vehicle traffic to have to slow down even further, causing drivers to become even more impatient. The group of cyclists was expanding into the westbound lane when the gray sedan approached. Witnesses report that the car had its window down, and many participants were yelling at the driver to slow down or stop. Instead, the driver sped up, accelerating directly into the two cyclists and narrowly missing a dozen other cyclists, including children. One witness stated "There was no doubt in my mind he just did it on purpose. He looked mad and was using his car as a weapon." The Oakland Police Department has not apprehended anyone, even after being provided video, eyewitness accounts, and a license plate number. An OPD officer appeared to blame the riders, saying the department received multiple calls from citizens that bicyclists in the area near Alcatraz were creating a hazard causing vehicular traffic.

== Porto Alegre, Brazil ==
On February 25, 2011, an automobile driver deliberately collided with around 20 cyclists that were participating in a Critical Mass event in Rua José do Patrocinio in Porto Alegre, southern Brazil. Out of approximately 150 people that were taking part in the event, dozens of bicycles were damaged, 15 people were injured and eight were transported to the emergency room. While the driver left the scene of the incident, demonstrators remained on the street, demanding that the driver be found and arrested. The driver was later identified as 47-year-old Ricardo José Neis. After Neis gave his statement to the police, his attorney, Luis Fernando Coimbra Albino, stated that the Neis was acting in self-defense after several cyclists threatened him and his son and assaulted his car. According to witnesses present at the event, Neis was acting violently behind the bicycles and hit the rear wheels of two different cyclists, and any contact from the cyclists on his car was meant as a sign asking him to slow the vehicle down. Witnesses also reported that Neis had two different transversal roads he could have taken to avoid waiting for the cyclists to proceed. On March 1, 2011, Neis attempted to transfer from a hospital to a psychiatric clinic, but this request was rejected by court officials. He was held in the hospital under police custody, but was later released and indicted under 17 counts of attempted murder. One of the most severely injured cyclists, 23-year-old Ricardo Mattes Ambus, was readmitted to the hospital on March 3, 2011, due to an intracranial haematoma.

During the following week, between February 28 and March 6, 2011, many protests in support of Critical Mass Porto Alegre were organized in several major cities in South America and around the world. In response, local cyclists organized the World Bike Forum in Porto Alegre to raise awareness of violence in traffic against cyclists. The first Forum took place during the anniversary of the incident.

On November 24, 2016, Ricardo Neis was sentenced to 12 years and 9 months in jail for attempted murder and aggravated assault.

== San Francisco, California, US ==
=== July 1997 ===
On the night of July 25, 1997, in San Francisco, the ride attracted 5,000 participants, which resulted in congested traffic, confrontations with motorists, and arrests. Interest and tension had been growing for several weeks due to increased rhetoric from then-Mayor Willie Brown regarding cracking down on the event. The local newspapers published a city-approved route after the mayor withdrew his threat to have bicyclists arrested for not obtaining a parade permit. Because of the large turnout, it was difficult if not impossible for cyclists to follow the sanctioned route. Riders instead found themselves engaged in verbal and physical altercations with motorists and police, as well as among themselves. Two officers reported injuries in confrontations with bike riders. Local media reported that "about 250" bicyclists were arrested, most for disrupting traffic, and a few for being drunk in public, battery, and outstanding warrants. The bicyclists' perspective was showcased in the 1999 film We Are Traffic!.

=== March 2007 ===
On the March 2007 ride in San Francisco, a rider was arrested on felony (later reduced to misdemeanor) charges in San Francisco's Tenderloin neighborhood for denting a limousine using a bicycle lock. The driver told police he got out of his car to talk to two cyclists who allegedly blocked his path. After exchanging words with one of the cyclists, the driver said he grabbed one of the bicycles and tried to pull it out of the way. He then got back into his limo to go around the riders, but before he could move, he said, another cyclist ran into the side of his car, then punched the hood with a U-shaped lock. The cyclist told police he only hit the limousine after the driver gunned his engine. During the incident, one of the limousine's tires was slashed and the driver's keys were stolen.

Towards the end of the ride, near the Japan Center and Western Addition neighborhoods, a mother from Redwood City, California, traveling with her two young daughters in the vehicle, tried to drive through the mass of riders. A witness claimed to have observed the driver strike a cyclist and flee before cyclists chased and surrounded her vehicle. The driver denied striking a cyclist and alleged that hundreds of cyclists surrounded her minivan while she and her 11- and 13-year-old daughters were inside, banged on her car, scratched the paint, and threw a bicycle through the rear window of the vehicle, causing $5,300 in damages.

In April 2007, San Francisco Mayor Gavin Newsom requested that Critical Mass riders police themselves. "It does the bicycle-advocacy community no good to have people that are aggressive and dispirit the entire movement," Newsom said. "I would encourage the bicycle coalition to say, 'Look, we don't put up with this, enough is enough.' "

=== November 2009 ===
In November 2009, Stanley Roberts of KRON 4 News recorded several Critical Mass confrontations between bicyclists and vehicles at Van Ness and O'Farrell Streets. An old Critical Mass website advised riders not to be confrontational and block traffic, but in footage filmed by Roberts, bicyclists engaged in confrontational arguments with motorists and blocked roads to vehicular traffic.

=== August 2015 ===
In August 2015, KQED posted an article on a Critical Mass confrontation between a bicyclist and a female Zipcar driver in the San Francisco Marina District. 39 year old Ian Hespelt was arrested a few days later by the San Francisco Police Department's bicycle patrol at AT&T Park during the Billy Joel concert. Hespelt was charged with four felonies including assault, vandalism, maliciously throwing a substance at a vehicle and false imprisonment. Hespelt was also wanted in Washington state on a felony drug charge warrant.

== Seattle, Washington, US ==
=== June 2006 ===
Two riders were arrested during the June 2006 ride in Seattle, Washington, after a fight with two undercover detectives whom the cyclists confused for gang members. Witnesses disputed the claim made by the sheriff's office that the detectives identified themselves. The King County Sheriff's Office decided not to press felony charges in the case, saying there were too many issues over the circumstances surrounding the allegations.

=== July 2008 ===
On July 25, 2008, Critical Mass prevented a motorist from driving from a curbside parking space into cyclists on East Aloha. The motorist made statements to Seattle police that he drove away, hitting bicycles and riders (one of them an attorney), and told the press that he "freaked out and overreacted" when bicyclists threatened to tip his vehicle. According to some witnesses, the motorist drove into at least two cyclists and tried to flee.

A group of riders caught the vehicle, broke its rear windshield, slashed the tires, and assaulted the motorist when he got out. Damage to the car was estimated at $1,500. The motorist was struck in the back of his head by a bike lock and later hospitalized. Two cyclists were arrested for vandalism to the car. Seattle police did not charge the motorist.

== Vilnius, Lithuania ==
On July 27, 2007, in Vilnius, Lithuania, police took five participants into custody, including two minors, for not following orders to disband.

== Walnut Creek, California, US ==
In Walnut Creek, California, on June 20, 2008, a car bumped into the rear wheel of a Critical Mass rider. An argument ensued among the driver and passenger of the car and the cyclist involved, after which the passenger and driver of the car assaulted the cyclist. The police arrived and arrested the passenger and driver of the automobile involved in the assault.

== Warsaw, Poland ==
On June 21, 2002, in Warsaw, Poland, the Critical Mass event was stopped by a cordon of fully armed riot police on Plac Konstytucji (Constitution Square), who demanded their dispersal and detained some of the participants. Other Critical Mass participants responded with a sit-in protest, blocking an important traffic junction, and then tried to evade the blockade by taking different routes to Plac Zamkowy (Castle Square), the Critical Mass rally point. This event was widely reported by the media and, as a result, the Warsaw municipality decided to legalize future events, rather than escalate the conflict. Beginning in September 2002, Critical Mass events in Warsaw are organized in full cooperation with the police force. Once a year in August, beginning in 2007, a special Critical Mass is organized in cooperation with the city officials to commemorate the Warsaw Uprising.
