= World Bike Forum =

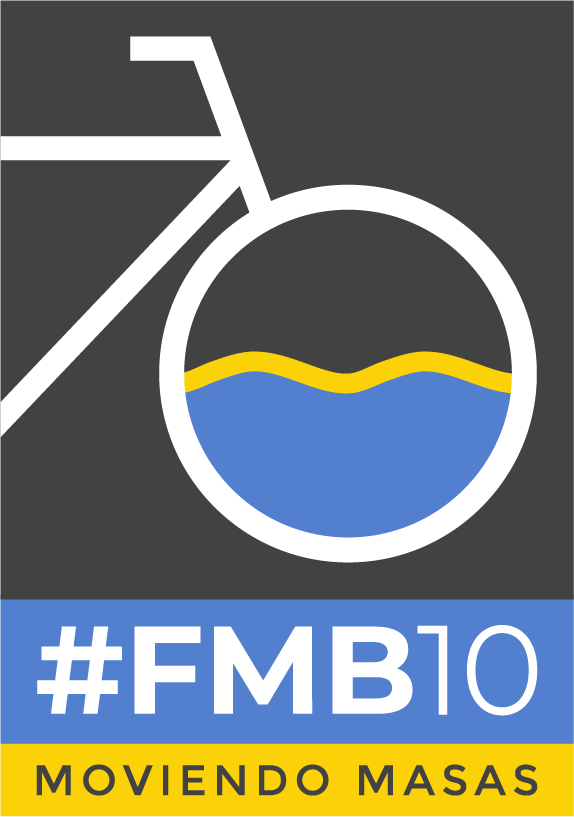
2010 conference logo

The World Bike Forum (WBF, Portuguese: Fórum Mundial da Bicicleta, FMB), is a yearly cycling activism event in which the topics of bicycle urban mobility and the planning of cities made by and for the people are discussed.

According to its creators the WBF began as an answer to an automobile driver deliberately colliding with around 20 cyclists that were participating in a Critical Mass event in Porto Alegre on February 25, 2011 (see Conflicts involving Critical Mass). The first edition of the WBF took place during the first anniversary of these events.

The WBF is composed of different events that include discussion panels with invited speakers, self-managed workshops, cultural activities including art and video exhibitions, artistic performances and several cycling events.

Beyond the discussion, the WBF tries to strengthen the social networks among participants from different cities and countries, to encourage permanent changes in the venue city and, through the sharing of experiences and practical workshops, to stimulate an immediate personal change of the participants.

The WBF has been held in the Brazilian cities of Porto Alegre (2012 and 2013) and Curitiba (2014). In 2015 Medellín, Colombia, was the first city outside of Brazil to host the event. The 2016 edition of the event took place in Santiago, Chile, from March 31 to April 5, 2016. The 2017 edition was held in Mexico City, Mexico April 19 to 23 2017, with the theme 'Handmade Cities'. The 2018 edition was held in Lima, Peru February 22 to 26. The 2019 edition was held in Quito, Ecuador April 25 to 28, with the theme 'MINGA' (a word from the Quechua people meaning 'collective work'). The 2020 edition was held in Kathmandu, Nepal.

== Guiding Principles ==
- Freeness: All activities within the Forum must be completely free for any interested person. Also, the access to other services without cost such as lodging or the lending of bicycles is sought.
- Horizontality: The planning and organizing is done through volunteer work, with all information being public and no hierarchy within the involved personnel (horizontal or Flat organization)
- Self managed: Except for the main conferences and some special events, most of the proposed activities are self managed.
- Made by the people: Although many partnerships and communication channels are established among institutions of diverse backgrounds (education, government, private, third/voluntary sector ), the work is ultimately done by individuals, with no appropriation by private enterprises and free of publicity, logos or trademarked brands.

== Previous editions ==
=== Porto Alegre - FMB2012 ===
The first edition of the Forum was held from February 23 to 26, 2012 in Porto Alegre, where an intentional run over happened. The Forum coincided with the 1st anniversary of the collective trampling. Porto Alegre was the location of the first World Social Forum in January 2001.

According to the organizers, the event had approximately 7 thousand participants, including speakers, film-makers and visitors from different Brazilian states and countries who participated in panels on the themes of Urban Mobility, Cycling, Economy, Sports Cycling, Cycling and more than 20 workshops related to the universe the bike. Chris Carlsson was the international guest. The event generated spontaneous media, being mentioned in more than 50 news items published in print newspapers, around 50 segments on radio and TV and around 400 segments on the internet. The success of the first event motivated the realization of its second edition, improving the debate about the need for cities for people and the role that the bicycle and other sustainable modes have as drivers of urban and social transformations.

=== Porto Alegre - FMB2013 ===
Held from February 21 to 24, 2013 with the theme "Pedal to transform". The second edition, also organized in Porto Alegre, attracted more than seven thousand people from all over the world. And it served as a stimulus for the discussion of new ways to ensure more structure for cyclists and more traffic safety for the general population. In this edition, crowdfunding was introduced through the Catarse website to fund the arrival of international guests: Caroline Samponaro, Mona Caron and Amarilis Horta Tricallotis.

=== Curitiba - FMB2014 ===
The 3rd edition of the WBF took place between February 13 and 16, 2014 under the motto "Cidade em Equilíbrio" ("A balanced city"). In this edition the WBF had a strong growth, with the attendance of international guests such as San Francisco's Critical Mass co-founder Chris Carlsson, San Francisco based Swiss artist Mona Caron, independent publisher focusing "on feminist nonfiction about bicycling" Elly Blue, and Danish architect and urban planner Lars Gemzøe. Nearly 80 self-managed activities took place .

Crowdfunding was used for the first time and a registration form, both online and live, was introduced in order to estimate the number of assistants and create communication channels among them. The event had a total of 1359 online and 243 live registrations. Presumably, since registration was not mandatory, the total number of assistants was larger.

Representatives of 20 out of the 26 states of Brazil and at least 10 different countries led at least one activity or conference during the event. Among the assisting organizations were União de Ciclistas do Brasil, Clube de Cicloturismo do Brasil, CicloIguaçu (Paraná), Ciclocidade(São Paulo), ViaCiclo Florianópolis (Sanata Catarina), Rodas da Paz (Distrito Federal), Pedala Manaus (Amazonia), BH em Ciclo (Minas Gerais), Transporte Ativo (Rio de Janeiro), Associação de ciclismo de Balneário Camboriú e Camboriú (Santa Catarina), Associação Blumenau Pró-ciclovias (Santa Catarina), Associação de Ciclistas de Porto Alegre (Rio Grande do Sul), Ciclovida UFPR and Bikes Not Bombs (Boston, USA).

Concurrently the film festival "Festival Ciclecine" took place with a strong attendance .

=== Manizales, Colombia - FMB2022 ===
The 11th edition of the WBF took place between November 9–13, 2022.

== See also ==
- Velo-city, annual world cycling summit
- World Cycling Alliance, organisation that promotes cycling for transportation and leisure
