= Iowa City Bike Library =

Non-profit bicycle advocacy organization

The Iowa City Bike Library is a non-profit bicycle advocacy organization founded in 2004. It is supported by donors, grants and by community volunteers. It provides refurbished bicycles that have been donated from the community for sale. A large inventory of parts are available from non-salvageable donated bicycles. This organization is similar in its goals to others in the United States and around the world.

After their previous downtown location was purchased for development, funds were raised to purchase a 7,000 square foot building on 1222 South Gilbert Ct, Iowa City, Iowa in 2021. This venue contains space for displaying bikes for sale as well as workbenches and tools for repairing bicycles available to the public at nominal cost. Volunteers are usually available to give repair advice.

Various free classes relating to bicycling are provided throughout the year including teaching beginners to ride. The new building has space for hosting a program for teens to learn about bicycling and bicycle maintenance.

== Transportation ==
Low traffic streets or bicycle paths connect to the University of Iowa campus, west Iowa City, Coralville, south Iowa City or downtown Iowa City. Free Iowa City transit buses stop one block away on South Gilbert st.
