= With My Own Two Wheels =

- Directed by: Jacob and Isaac Seigel-Boettner
- Release date: 2010

With My Own Two Wheels is a 2010 film by brothers Jacob and Isaac Seigel-Boettner about the transformational power of bicycles. It was screened at the Mountainfilm Festival in Telluride, Colorado.

== Synopsis ==
It focuses on five individuals from around the world: Fred, a caregiver from Zambia who rides from village to village visiting AIDS patients; Carlos in Guatemala, who invented a pedal-powered device that offers a small-scale alternative to diesel-fueled machines; Sharkey, who avoids gang life by working in a Santa Barbara, California neighborhood bike shop; Bharati, a young girl in India who gets an education because she has a bicycle to ride to school; and Mirriam, a bike mechanic in Ghana stricken with Polio.

== Awards ==
- Official Selection - San Luis Obispo International Film Festival
- Official Selection - Santa Barbara International Film Festival
- Nominee – 2011 Fund for Santa Barbara Social Justice in Documentary Film Award
- Winner - Judith Lee Stronach Baccalaureate Prize – UC Berkeley

== See also ==
- Bikes Not Bombs
- Pedaling to Freedom
- World Bicycle Relief
