= Pedaling to Freedom =

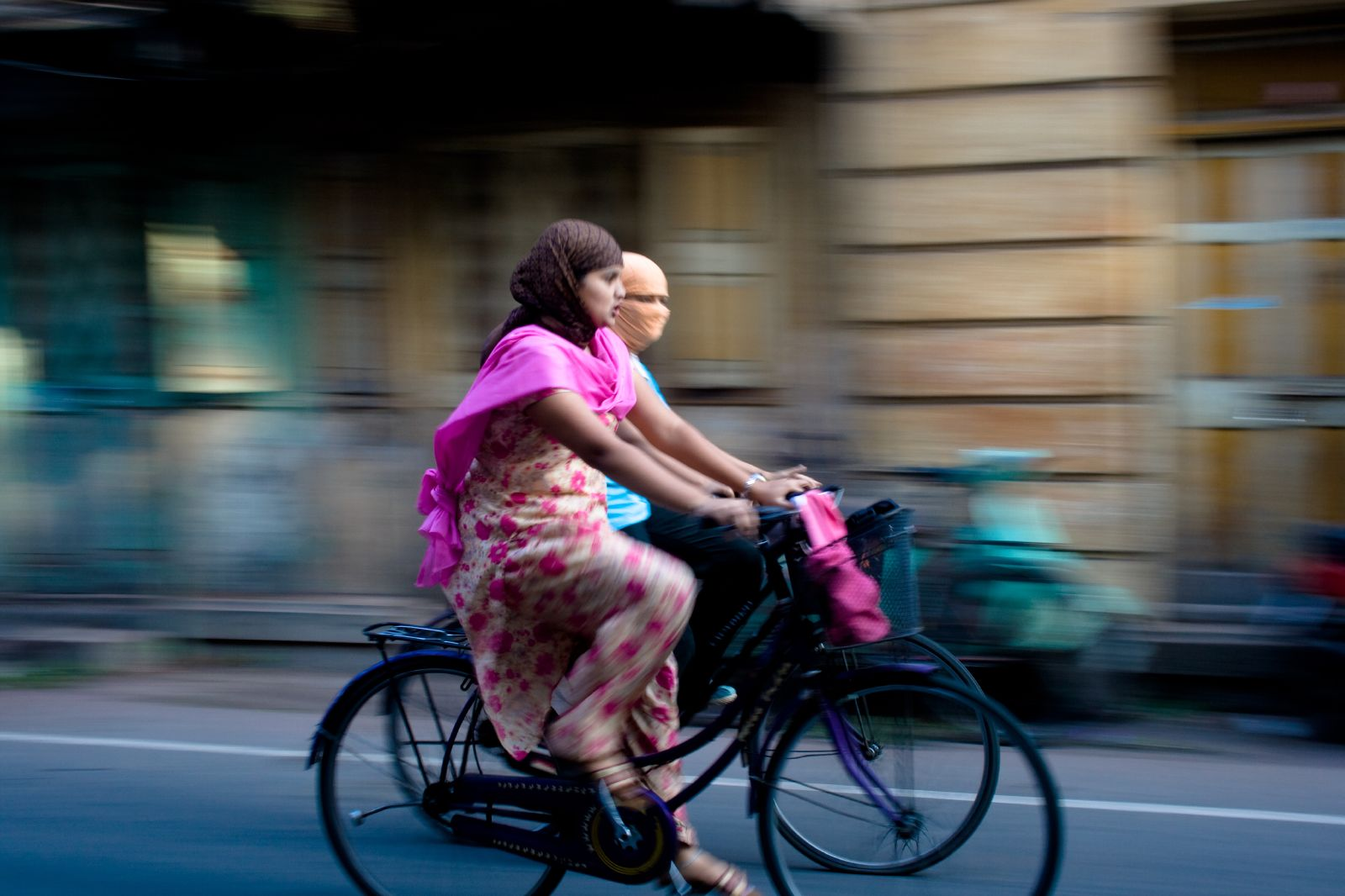
- Girls bicycling along street in India.
- Directed by: Vijay S. Jodha
- Written by: Vijay S. Jodha
- Produced by: PSBT & Prasar Bharati
- Starring: N. Kannammal, Sheela Rani Chunkath
- Cinematography: Sanjay Agrawal
- Edited by: Vijay S. Jodha
- Music by: Pradeep Kotnala
- Distributed by: Syncline Films Pvt. Ltd.
- Release date: 23 August 2007 (India)
- Running time: 28 minutes
- Country: India
- Language: English/Tamil

Pedaling to Freedom (2007) is a 28-minute documentary directed by Vijay S. Jodha. The film shows how a simple thing, such as teaching women to ride a bicycle in a deprived part of the world, can have a life-changing impact. The documentary was made in English and Tamil.

== Content ==
Pedaling to Freedom is a documentary film set in Pudukkottai district of Tamil Nadu, India. The film revisits a year-long initiative that took place there in 1993, in what used to be one of the poorest parts of the world. As a result of this initiative 230,000 people learnt to read and write, and over 100,000 women learnt to ride bicycles. Wages increased 1000%. It happened in the space of just one year and cost less than one and a half dollars per person. The film relies on archival stills, filmed footage as well as interviews with those who were associated with the project.

Kannammal, an insurance company office assistant who took leave from work to volunteer for the project is featured prominently. She served as a central coordinator and at the end of the project, went back to her office where she remains an office assistant.

Mobility was seen as an important tool for empowerment and in addition to reading and writing, women were taught how to ride bicycles. The film captures the conditions in the district including cycling classes for women where men often gathered to crack jokes and taunt women trying to learn cycling. The film highlights the partnership between public and private bodies as well as work of 25,000 volunteers that made it possible.

== See also ==
- Accessibility (transport)
- Education in India
- With My Own Two Wheels
- World Bicycle Relief
