= Die-in =

Form of protest

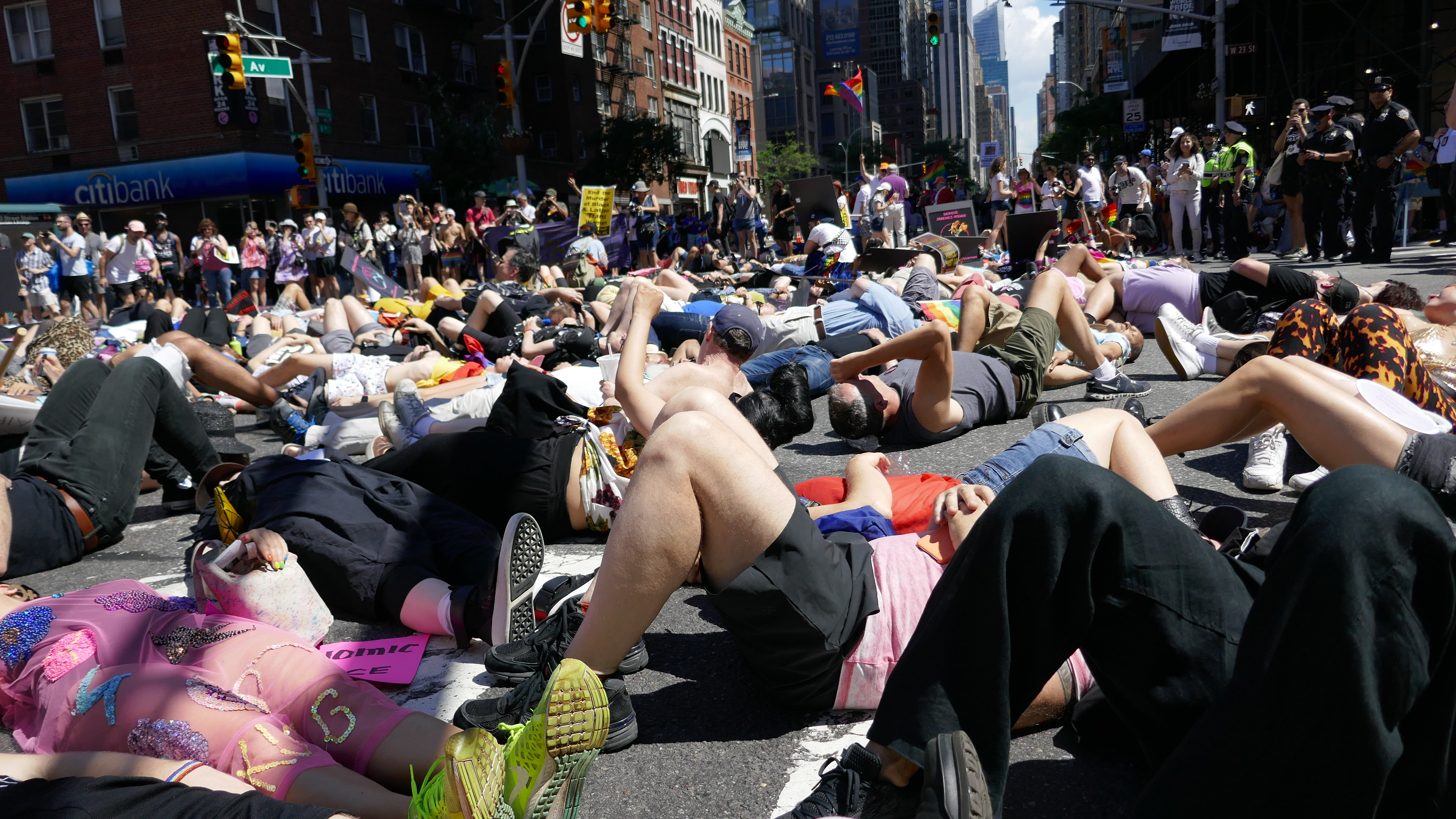
Die-in at the Queer Liberation March, 2019, in Manhattan

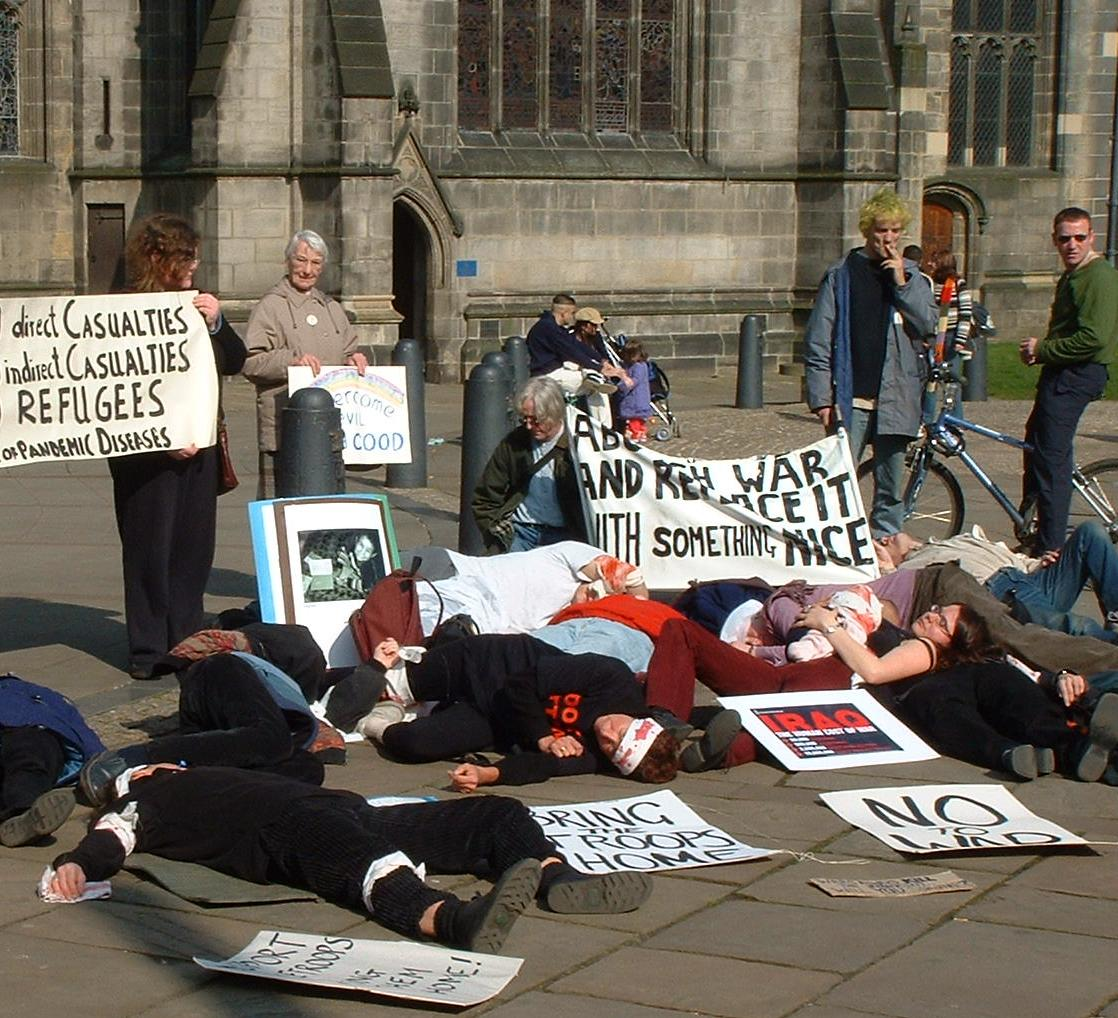
Die-in protest against 2003 invasion of Iraq in Sheffield, England, United Kingdom.

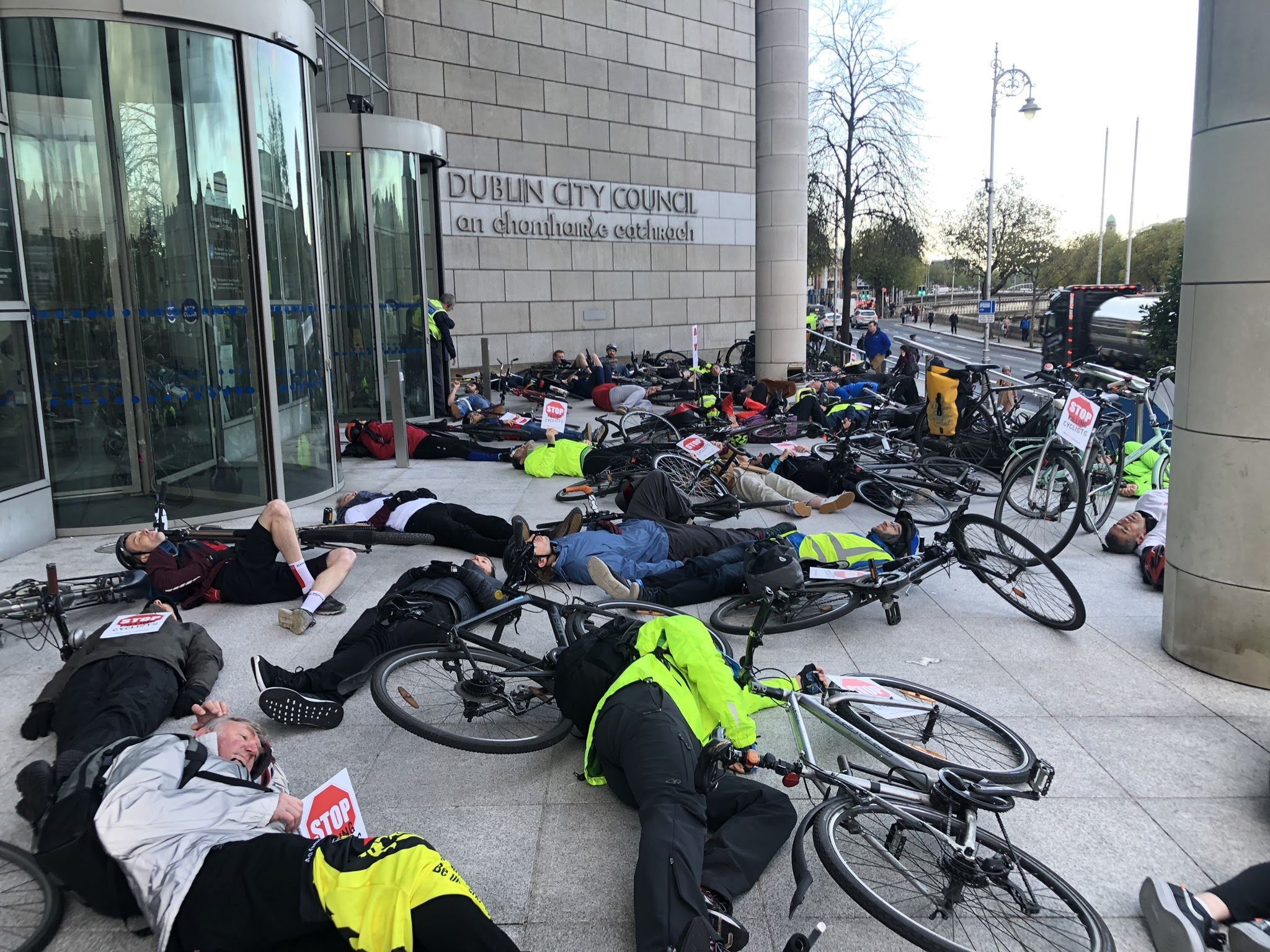
Die-in by I BIKE Dublin at Dublin City Council, 2019, in Dublin

A die-in, sometimes known as a lie-in, is a form of protest in which participants simulate being dead. Die-ins are actions that have been used by a variety of protest groups on topics such as animal rights, anti-war, against traffic violence, human rights, AIDS, gun control, racism, abortion, and environmental issues. Often, protestors occupy an area for a short time instead of being forced to leave by the police.

In the simplest form of a die-in, protesters simply lie down on the ground and pretend to be dead, sometimes covering themselves with signs or banners. The point of a die-in is to disrupt the flow of people on a street or sidewalk to grab the attention of passers-by.

In more complex forms, fake blood or blood-stained bandages are sometimes used, as well as simulated death throes and writhing from the protesters in an attempt to make the deaths appear more realistic. In other cases, protesters have surrounded the "bodies" in chalk outlines reminiscent of the troped outlines around murder victims. This has been done as an attempt to symbolize that the organization being protested against has "murdered" people. Sometimes, part of the protesting group makes speeches about what is being protested while the rest of the group lies on the ground.

== Examples ==
On 22 April 2006, thousands of protesters lay in the Francisco de Miranda avenue in Caracas, Venezuela, to protest against crime and insecurity during Hugo Chávez's government in a protest by Movimiento Estudiantil called "Acuéstate por la vida" (Lie Down for Life).

On September 15, 2007, several thousand protested the Iraq war at the Capitol at Washington D.C. Hundreds "lay on the ground" on the Capitol lawn at the die-in. Over 190 were arrested, including ten veterans of that war.

The "die"-in has been used to protest police brutality in the United States. It has been used by organizers in Ferguson, Missouri, to protest the St. Louis Police Department's handling of Michael Brown's fatal shooting case in 2014, in New York City and the San Francisco Bay Area to protest the killing of Eric Garner, and in Chicago to protest the deaths of Alton Sterling and Philando Castile.

On December 15, 2018, more than 100 members of the Cambridge division of international social movement Extinction Rebellion did this in the university city centre, to call the county and city authorities to declare a climate emergency.

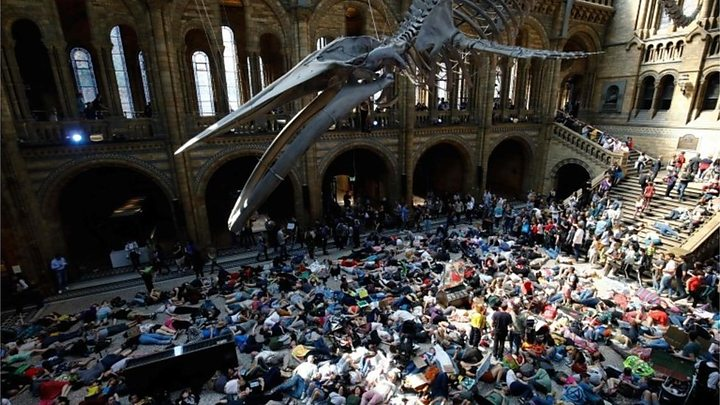
Die-in against ecological collapse by Extinction Rebellion in Natural History Museum, London

After the murder of George Floyd in the United States in June 2020, many demonstrations included lie-ins lasting for 8 minutes and 46 seconds, the length of time initial reports said Chauvin knelt on Floyd's neck.

On June 5, 2020, a die-in was staged outside Prime Minister Boris Johnson's Chief Adviser house in London to protest the Dominic Cummings scandal, in which former adviser Dominic Cummings made journeys stretching the rules of the UK's national lockdown.

== See also ==
- Sit-in
- Apparent death
- Teach-in
- Bed-In
