= I BIKE Dublin =

Dublin-based cycling advocacy group

- Founded: June 2017; 8 years ago Dublin
- Type: Adhocracy
- Location: Dublin
- Fields: Cycling activism Direct action campaigns

I BIKE Dublin is an advocacy group founded in Dublin, Ireland in 2017 and is focused on improving conditions for cycling in Dublin city. The group carries out direct actions to raise awareness of the issues facing people who cycle in Dublin and to pressure the authorities to do more to provide safe conditions for cycling.

The group's activities have included People Protected Bike Lanes, Die-ins and slow cycle protests.

== Activities ==
The first action took place on Andrew's Street, Dublin on 27 June 2017 and involved the protection of a contraflow cycle lane which was a black spot for illegal parking. The action immediately attracted media attention and a follow-up action a week later made the main evening news on national television channel RTÉ.

In December 2017, I BIKE Dublin coordinated a crowd sourcing of illegal parking on cycle lanes in Dublin in response to claims by the Garda Síochána that they were taking the issue seriously. More incidents of illegal parking were recorded in one week in Dublin than had been recorded by the Garda Síochána in an entire year, nationwide.

In April 2018, following the death of a young man while cycling in Donnybrook, Dublin, I BIKE Dublin teamed up with other cycling groups and organisations to stage a die-in outside Dáil Éireann to highlight the dangers faced by people cycling in Dublin.

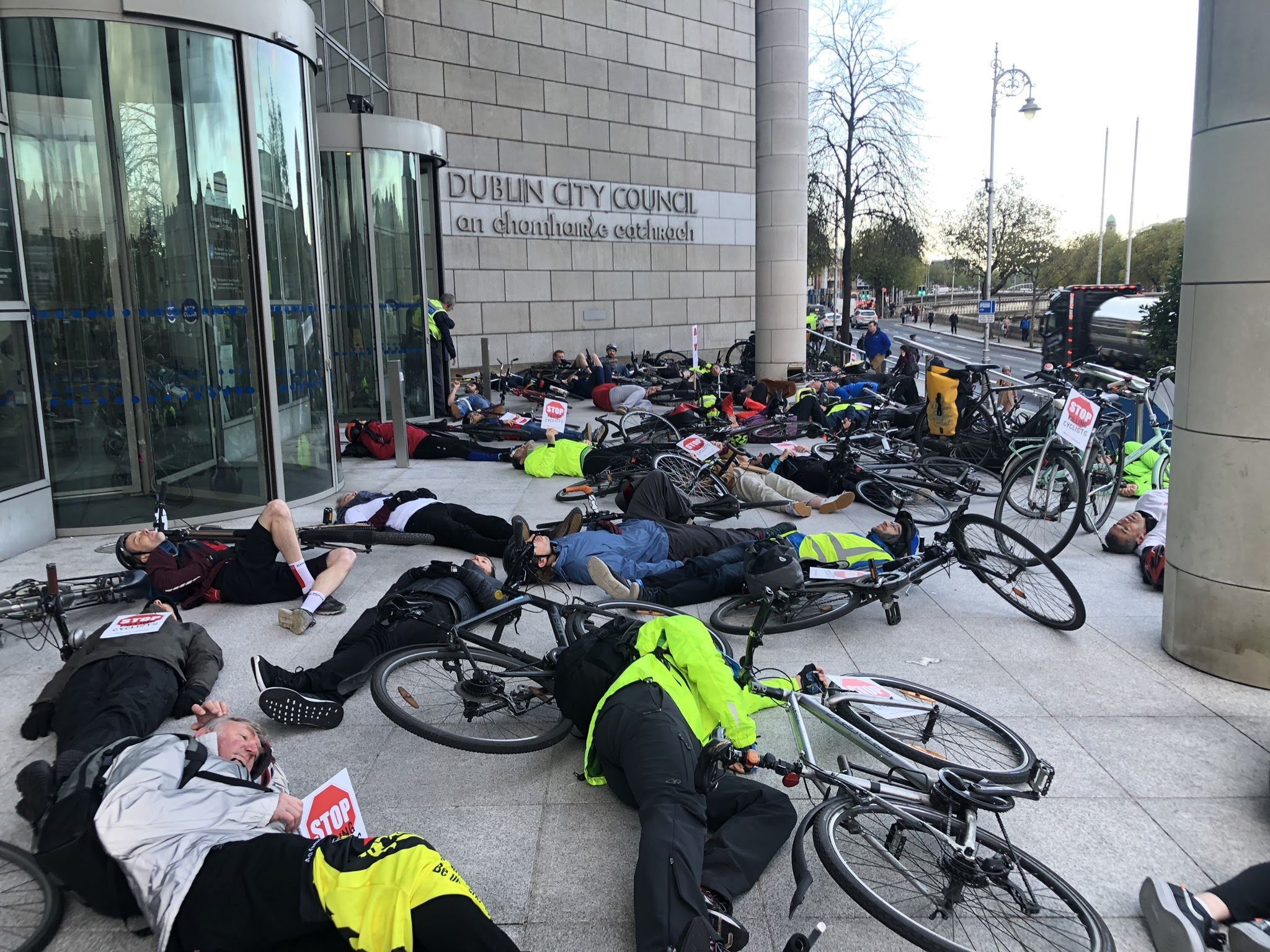
Die-in by I BIKE Dublin at Dublin City Council, 2019, in Dublin

In June 2019, the group presented its work at the Velo-city conference hosted by Dublin City Council. They presented Klaus Bondam, head of the Danish Cyclists' Federation, with a t-shirt in recognition of his outspoken criticism of the council and their lack of action in delivering safe cycling infrastructure.

In October 2019, I BIKE Dublin teamed up with Extinction Rebellion to stage a slow cycle along the streets of Dublin as part of Extinction Rebellion's Week of Action.

In November 2019 the group was invited to appear before the Joint Oireachtas Committee on Transport, Tourism and Sport to discuss the issues facing people who cycle in Dublin.

In December 2019, I BIKE Dublin presented Irish author, Dervla Murphy with the inaugural Inspiring Cyclist of the Year award in recognition of her life's work as a touring cyclist and travel writer.

Since 2021, the group has been one of the organisers of the monthly Critical Mass cycles in Dublin city.
