= Time's Up! =

Environmental organization in New York, United States

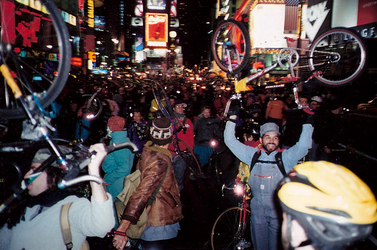
Critical Mass, Times Square, last Friday of every Month thousands of bicyclists lifted their bikes to demand Times Square become Auto Free: group bike rides helped increase cycling and put pressure on the city for sustainable infrastructure.

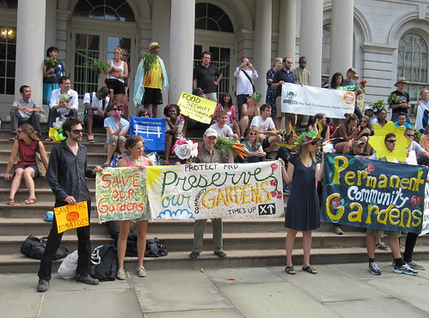
Time's Up! at City Hall protesting and celebrating the extension of the Spitzer agreement for community gardens

Time's Up! Environmental Organization was founded in 1987 to help educate New Yorkers about environmental awareness. One of its main focuses is to promote non-polluting transportation by advocating for bicycling.

Time's Up! helped found New York City's Pedicab industry and took a role in maintaining community gardens in New York City.

Other activities by the group include support for the Occupy Wall Street movement and the Museum of Reclaimed Urban Space. Time's Up! is run by volunteers, with some 150 members in 2012. Time's Up! also had a video documentary team. Dr. Michael Nash, the director of Tamiment Library, wrote: “Time's Up has been at the center of a new generation of activist politics in New York."

== History ==
=== Early years, 1980s-1990s ===
The group was founded in 1987 with a commitment to improving the environment by working with community members. The first campaign was designed to introduce New York City residents to the connections between everyday choices and purchases and environmental issues such as rain forest destruction, animal testing, energy consumption, air quality, and water pollution through a series of campaigns.

In 1988, the group partnered with other environmental organization to ban styrofoam and reduce harmful chemicals that destroy the ozone layer.

The group campaigned with posters against styrofoam packaging. Eventually, the styrofoam containers started showing up again in the late 90's. Finally, on July 1, 2015, New York City banned styrofoam containers.

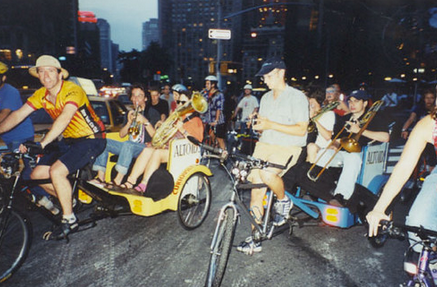
Time's Up! was involved in the founding of the Pedi Cab industry in New York City

In 1991 the group campaign to promote non-polluting transportation, focusing on hybrid-electric and electric-pedal-assist technology. The group teamed up with Light Wheels, Cooper Union and the HUB Station to conduct research and create early prototypes. The group organized workshops, seminars, and presentations.

In 1992 the group supported the creation of the first Green Apple Map, pinpointing 145 local sites in New York City that had environmental impact. Time's Up! co-spnsored annual Green Apple Cycling Tours that introduce the map's highlighted areas.

The following year, the group campaigned for eliminating car traffic from Central Park by organizing group rides. The group also organized for reducing car use by holding design competitions and street parties. Cars were eventually banned from using Central Park and Prospect Park, a move that the group takes credit for.

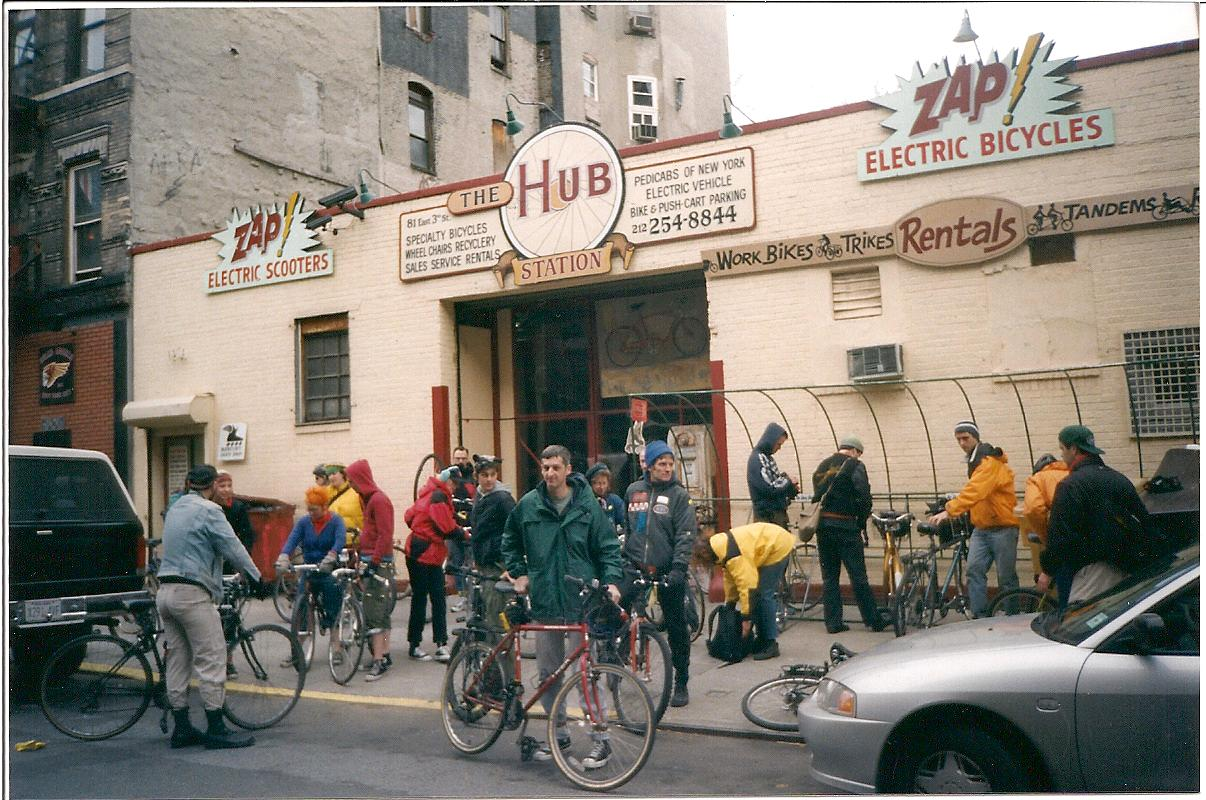
The Hub Station, 81 East 3rd Street in New York City

The group was also heavily involved with the advent of New York City's pedicab industry. Working with the HUB Station, Time's Up! designed, and produced pedicabs.

In 1994 the group started a Central Park Moonlight ride. It was very dangerous to ride in the streets of New York City, so the group chose Central Park as a safe auto-free location to build confidence among bicyclists. The Central Park Moonlight Ride offered cyclists a safe, fun way to explore the park at night.

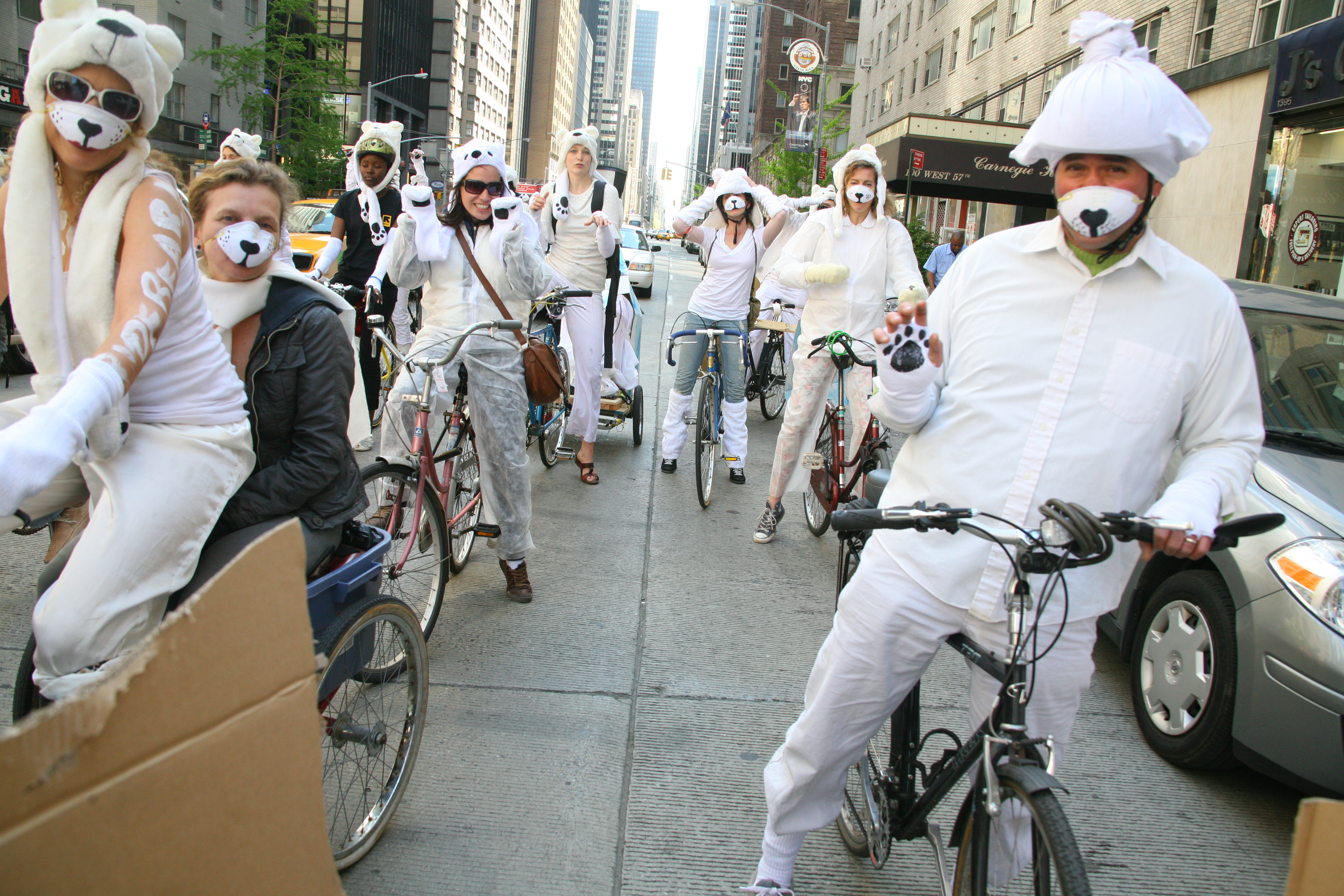
Time's Up held a Polar Bear Con Dance Ride to raise environmental awareness

1996 Time's Up teams up with Wetlands Activism Collective to launch a campaign to raise awareness about animal rights and the preservation of both virgin forest and rainforest ecosystems.

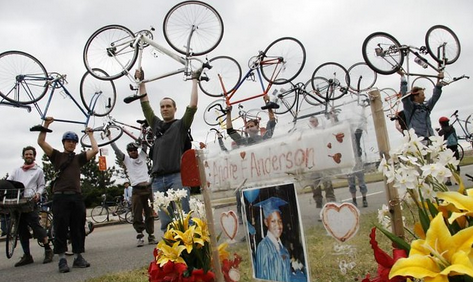
Members hold their bicycles in the air at a memorial

The group launched the Street Memorial Project, commemorating cyclists and pedestrians killed by motorists.

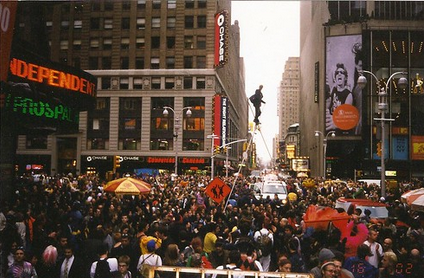
Reclaim the Street, Times Square: this action and the monthly critical mass rides led to Times Square's eventual denial of cars

1988 Reclaim The Streets, which started in England, is a way drawing attention to the fact that the urban design of cities was not only meant for cars, but for the community. This was done through direct action, art, and dance. This Reclaim The Streets campaign was very successful in Europe but was more difficult in America because the police had no patience for community-style events and street closings. However, in NYC from about 1998 till 2002, there were several Reclaim The Streets events; the first at Astor Place Cube, which took over Broadway and created a street rave for over 4 hours.

Another Reclaim The Streets event took place on Ave A/7th St, where it focused on reclaiming the street by taking over abandoned lots and turning them into vibrant community gardens. Reclaim The Streets took over Times Square and helped make it into a pedestrian plaza. There was even a Reclaim The Streets dance party in Williamsburg, Brooklyn on Bedford Ave.

New York City Reclaim The Streets was loosely organized by anybody who wanted to dance and help reclaim the streets but also had help from the lower East Side Collective and Time's Up! Environmental Organization.

=== 2000s- present ===
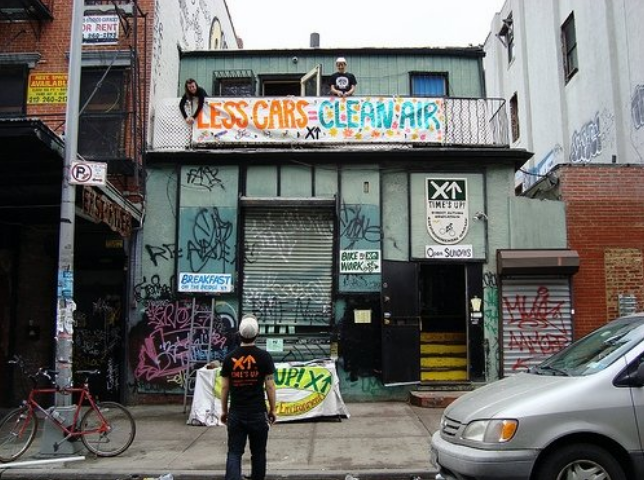
Time's Up's Brooklyn space

After Hurricane Sandy ravaged the East Coast in the fall of 2012, the group made electric bikes available for people to charge their phones and other small electronics. For the next several weeks, the group and others organized small volunteer teams to travel to Staten Island and the Rockaways (the hardest hit areas in the city) to bring electric bicycles, food, and other supplies to people in need.

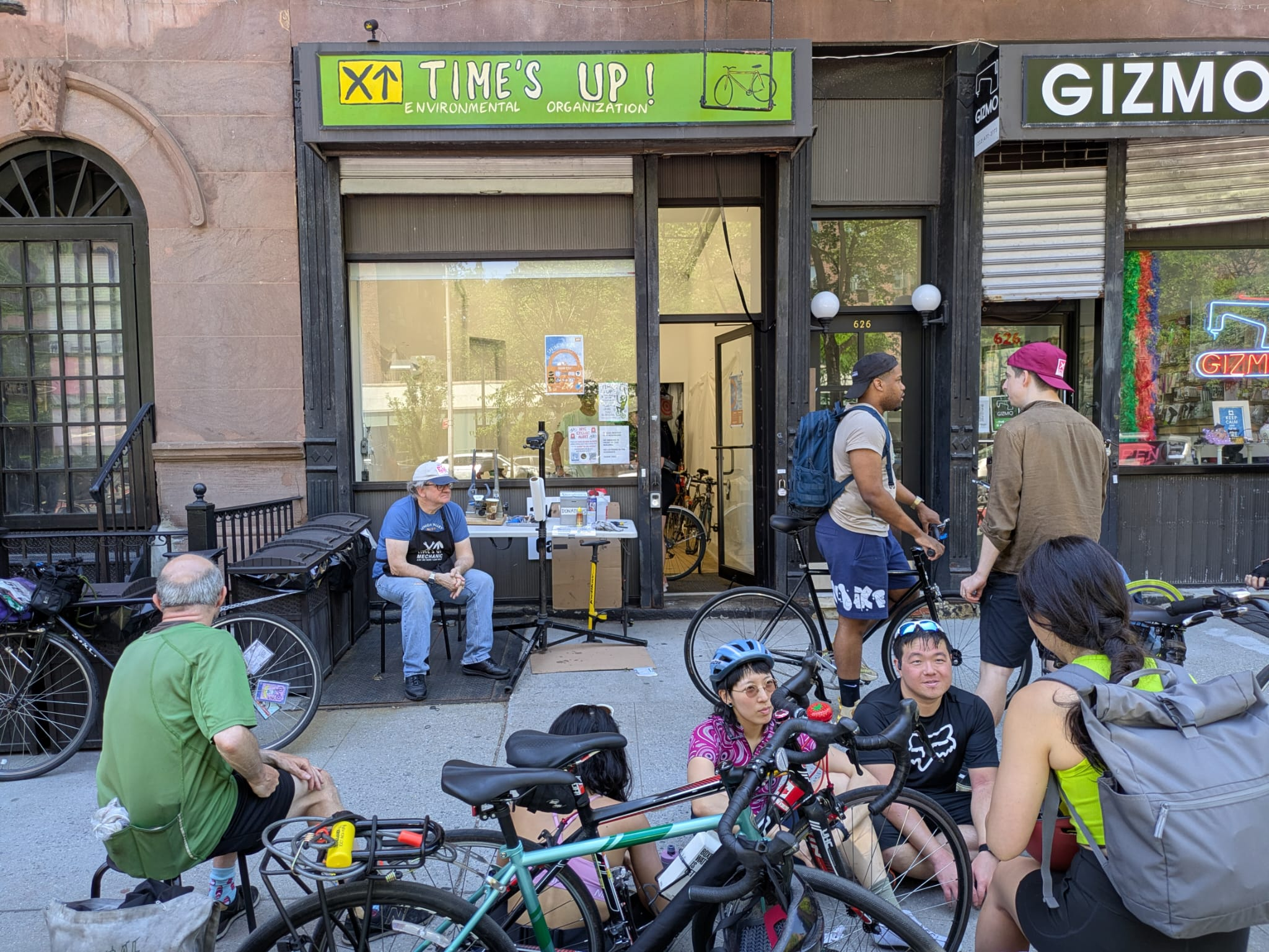
Cyclists waiting outside the East Village repair shop

As of 2026, Time's Up operates a bike cooperative for DIY bike repairs in the East Village. It is Manhattan's only bike kitchen providing low-cost repairs and servicing through the use of volunteer mechanics, secondhand components and private donations.
