= Lakefront =

Lakefront may refer to:

- Boulevard Lakefront Tour, non-competitive bicycle ride in downtown Chicago, Illinois, US
- Chicago Lakefront Trail, 18-mile multi-use path in Chicago, Illinois along the coast of Lake Michigan
- Cleveland Burke Lakefront Airport, public airport on the shore of Lake Erie in Cuyahoga County, Ohio, US
- Cleveland Lakefront Station, Amtrak's station in Cleveland, Ohio
- Lakefront, Syracuse, one of the 26 officially recognized neighborhoods of Syracuse, New York
- Lakefront Arena, 10,000-seat multi-purpose arena in New Orleans, Louisiana and was built in 1983
- Lakefront Brewery, Milwaukee's first microbrewery to achieve Regional Craft Brewery status
- Lakefront Consolidated School, school located in Tangier, Nova Scotia, Canada
- New Orleans Lakefront Airport, public use airport northeast of New Orleans, in Orleans Parish, Louisiana, US
- Lakefront, a theme area at Six Flags Great Adventure, Jackson, New Jersey
