= Bicycle parking station =

Building or structure for bicycle parking

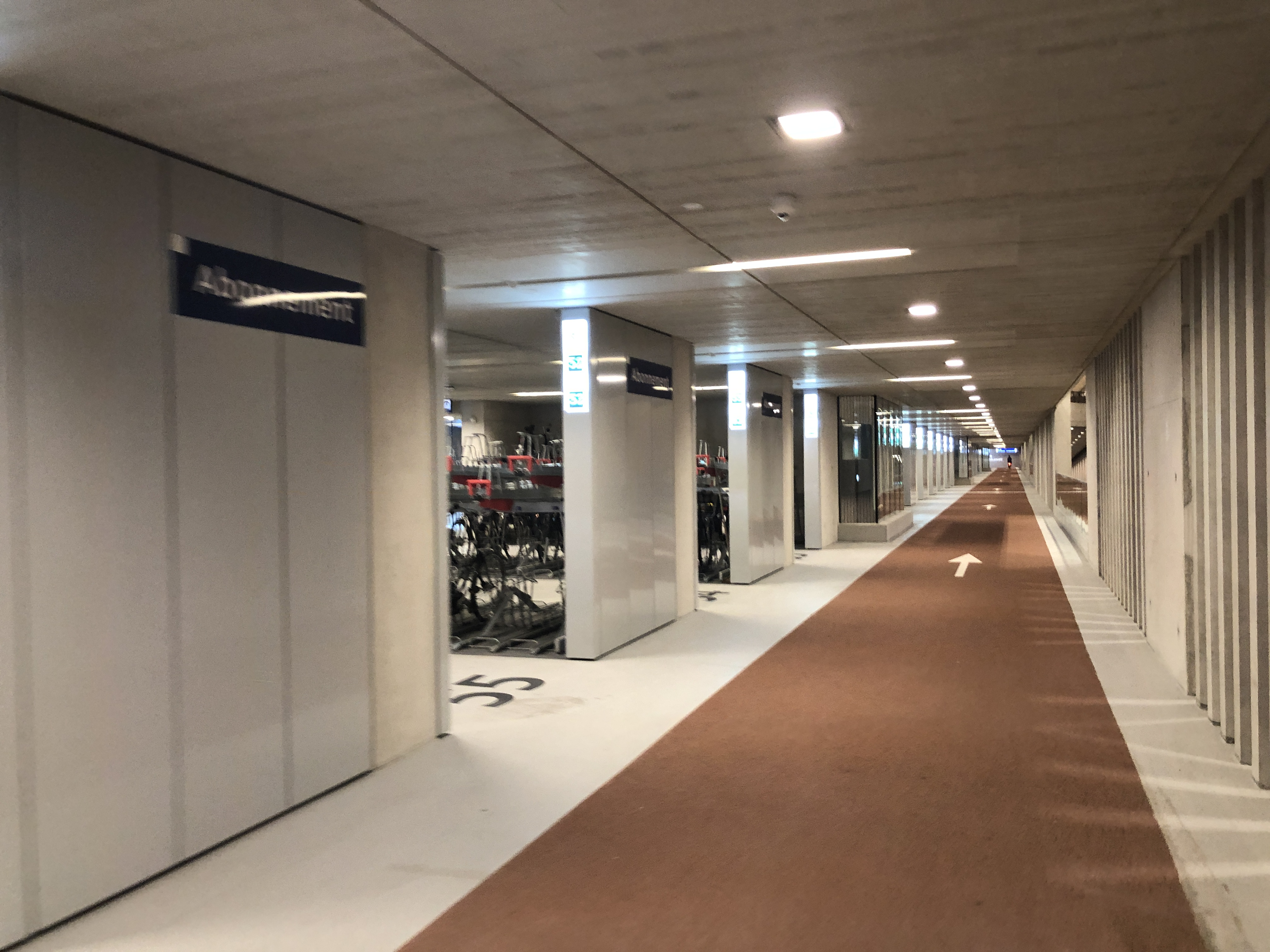
Complex: Utrecht Centraal's bicycle parking facility is the largest in the world.

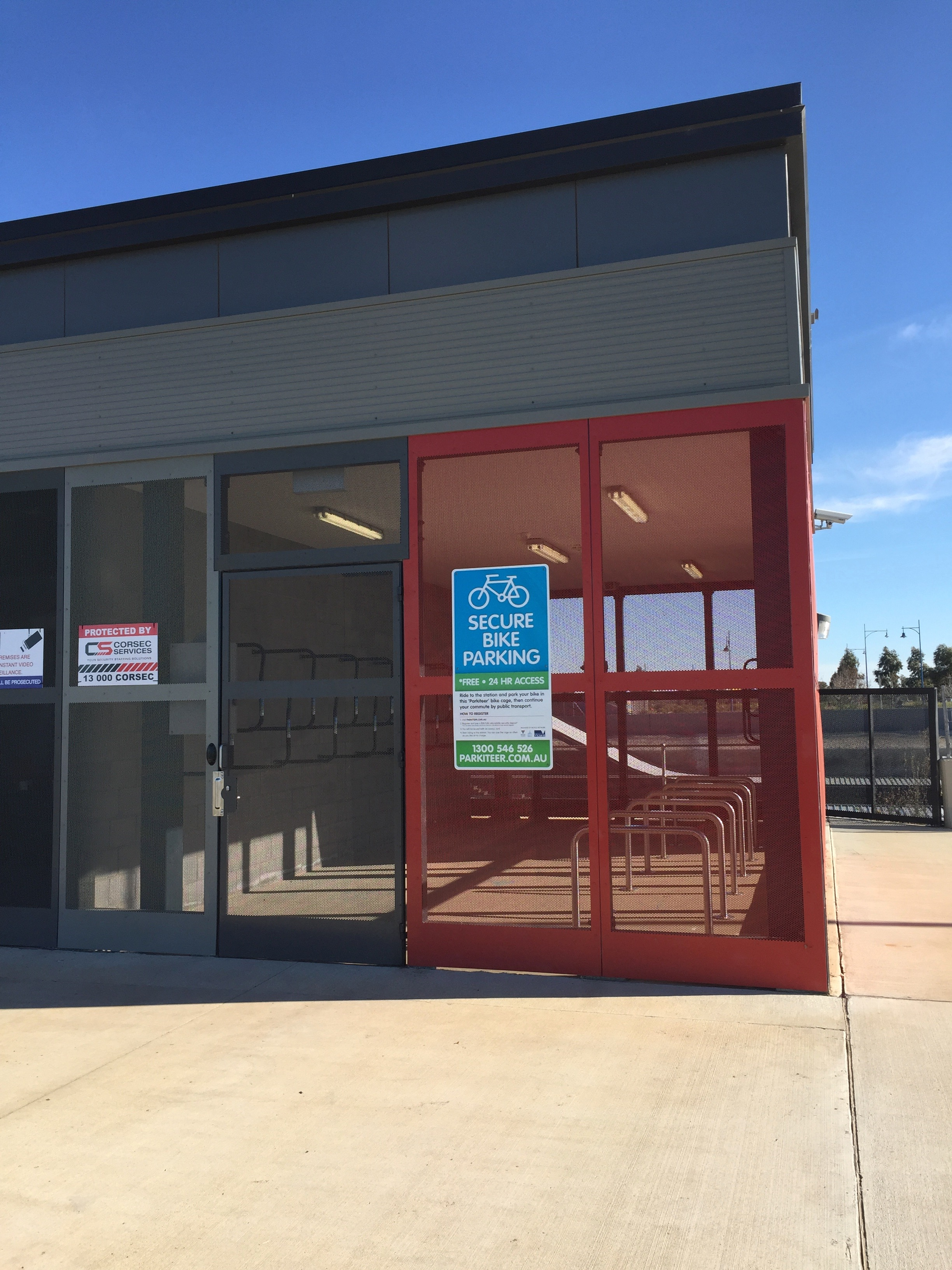
Simple: A Parkiteer e-card-accessible bike cage at Wyndham Vale station, Melbourne, Australia.

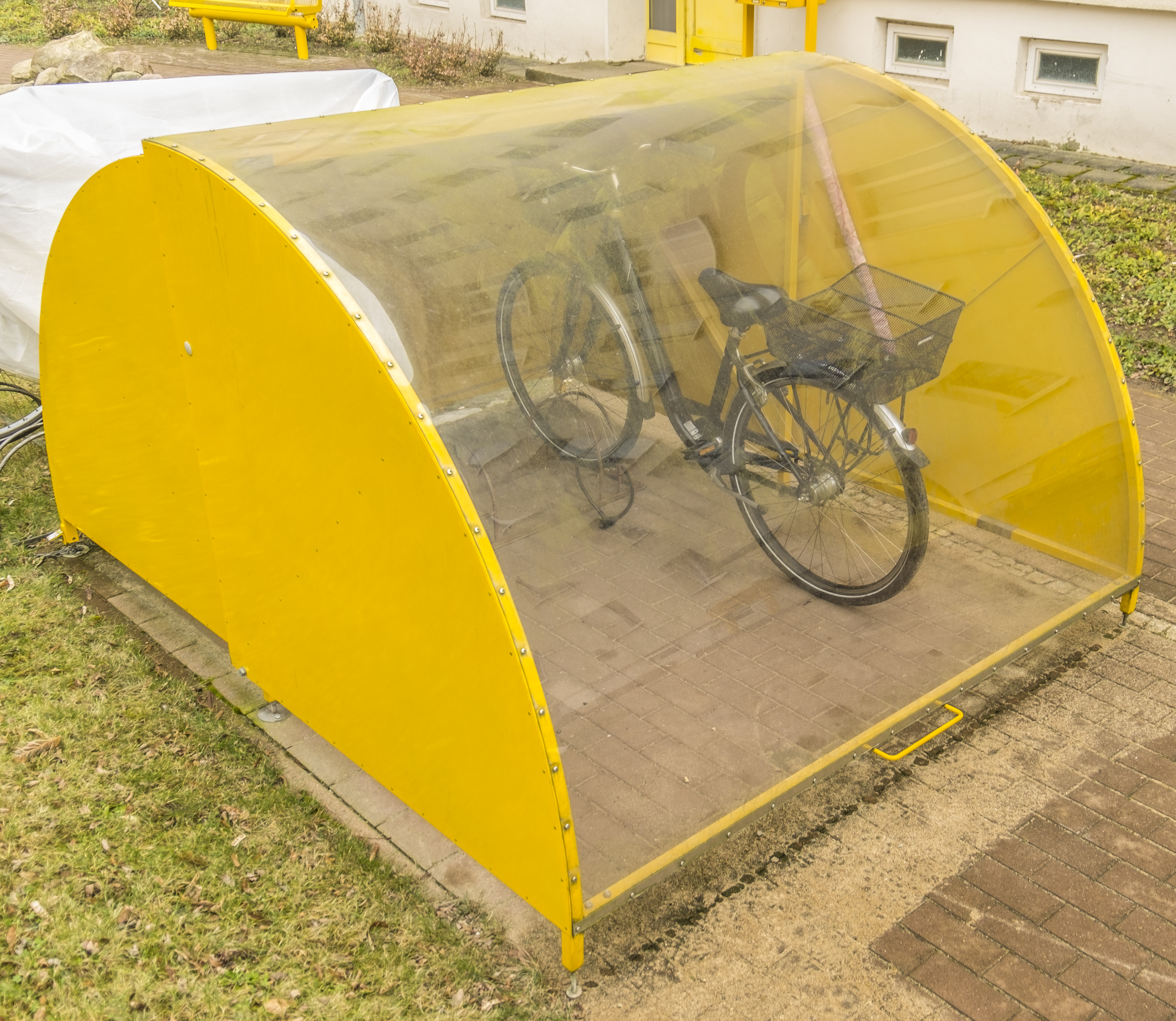
A lockable bike cage in Templin, Germany

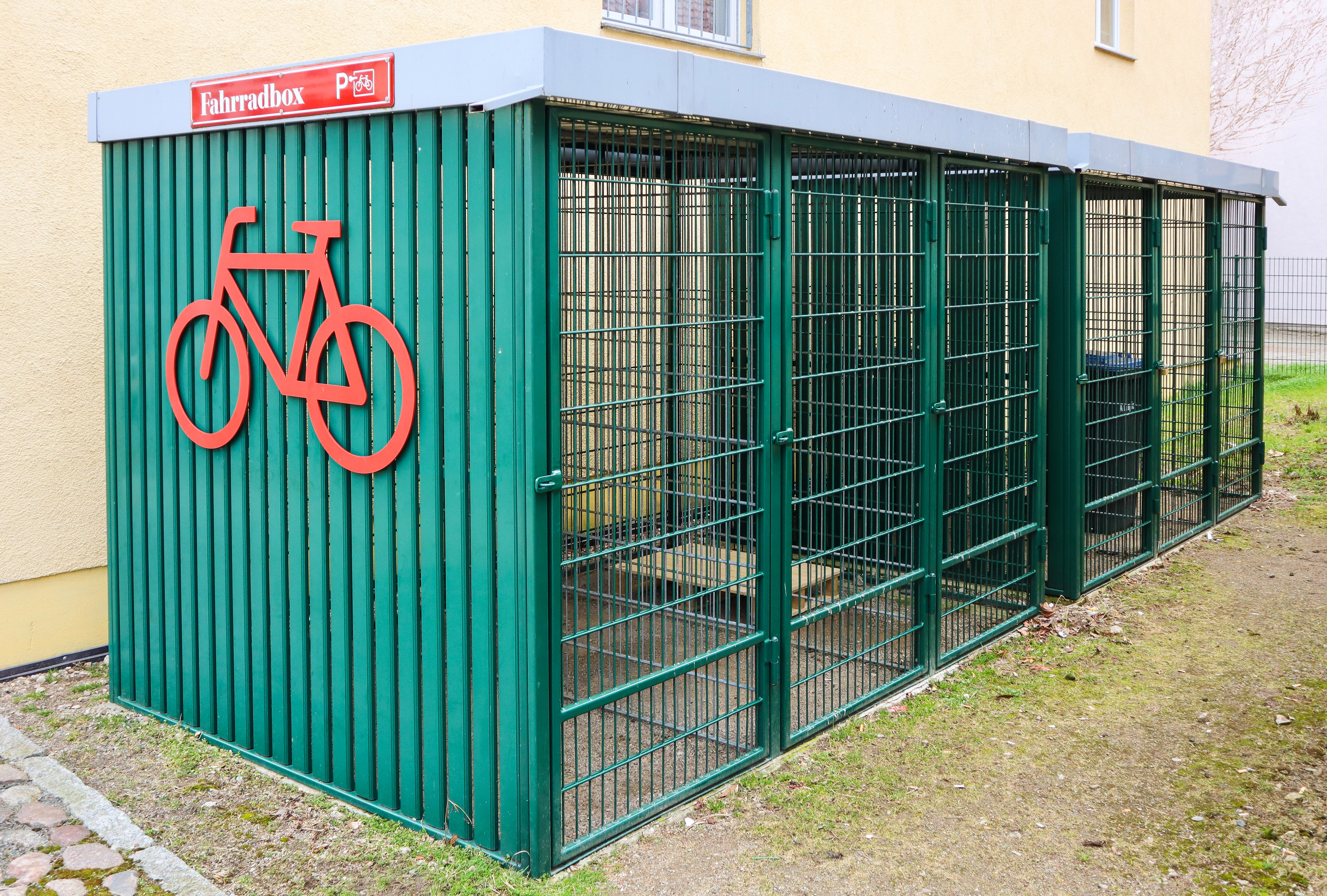
A lockable bike box in Angermünde, Germany

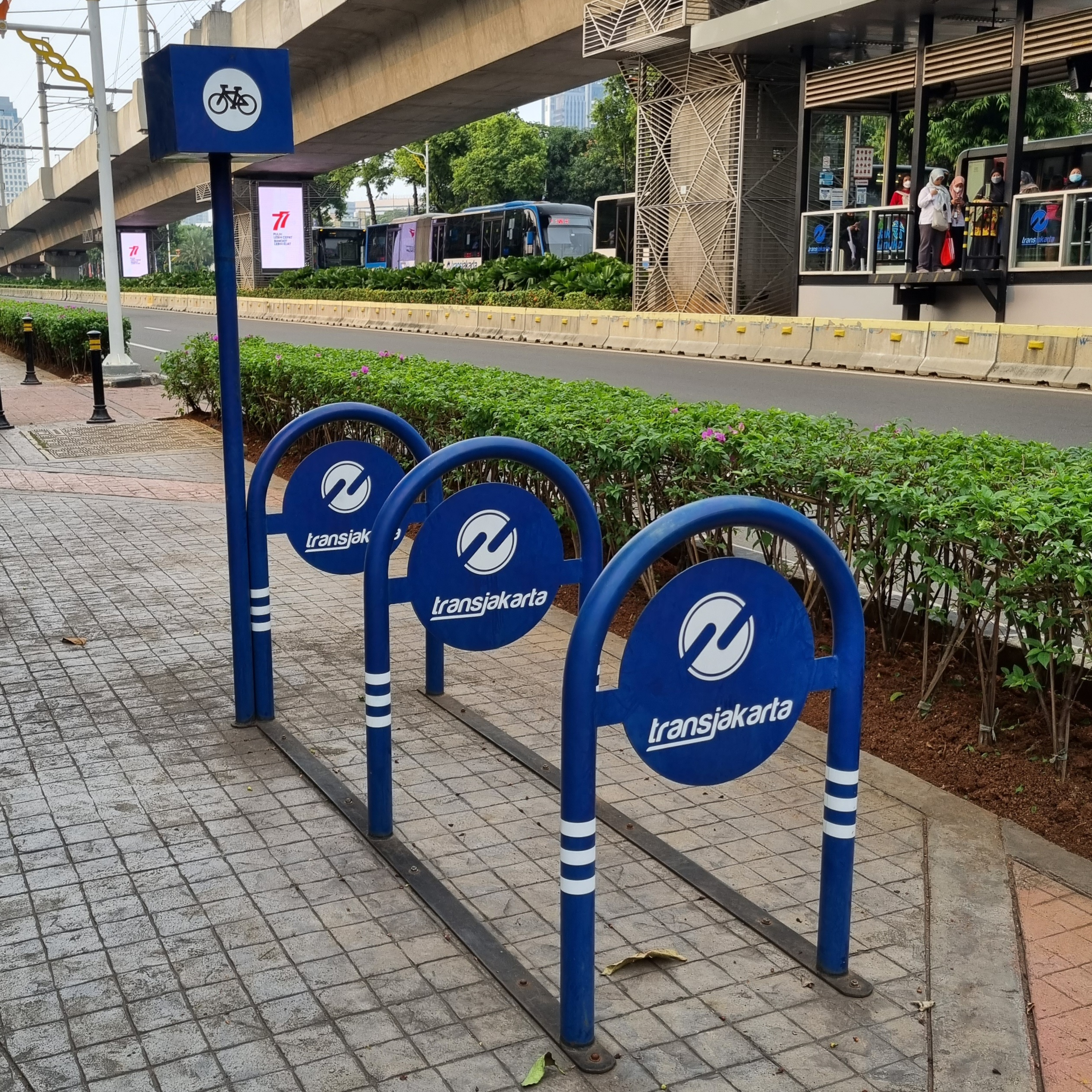
A bicycle parking rack in Jakarta, Indonesia

A bicycle parking station (alternatively: bicycle garage, bike station, bicycle center, or cycle center) is a building or structure designed for use as a secure bicycle parking facility. It can be as simple as a lockable bike cage or shed or as complex as a purpose-built multi-level building.

Some bicycle parking stations offer additional services such as bicycle repairs or facilities such as showers or lockers. Some are staffed; others are not. Some require users to join as members, while others are on a per-use basis or completely free of charge. Some are based at railway stations to facilitate "bike and ride" multi-modal transport, while others are situated at the end of the commute and as such are located in town or city centres, universities, and workplaces. Some allow the storage of helmets and other personal belongings. To save space, many store bicycles vertically, either in a kind of tower or under the floor in shafts.

== Operation ==
Bicycle parking stations are often operated by local governments or municipalities or they can be private businesses run by bike shops or non-profit bicycle advocacy organizations. Some are fully automated.

== Types ==
There are several types of bicycle parking stations. Most bicycle parking stations are non-automatic, and the user usually leaves their bike at bicycle parking racks in the facility. These facility are usually sheltered or indoor, but unsheltered outdoor facilities also exist.

Automatic bike parking stations exist in many forms, such as underground silos using automated storage and retrieval system.

== Services ==
Bike stations may have several services connected to the facility, including on-site security or a gate or door secured by key or by proximity card access to prevent thefts. Customers may also be able to use showers or locker rooms and changing rooms. There may be on site bathrooms and drinking fountains as well as food and beverages available via vending machines.

There may also be information available, such as pamphlets/brochures for bicycle safety, maps and other literature, e.g. about cycling routes or nearby points of interest. Some may even provide classes, e.g. bike maintenance or local area knowledge.

=== Bike services ===
Some bike stations (such as at many railway stations in the Netherlands) have staff who can perform simple or complex repairs for a fee. This is useful for commuters who can leave their bike there in the morning and pick it up repaired on the way home.

Stations may also provide an air pump, sell parts and accessories, or rent bicycles.

== Pricing ==
The most common pricing scheme for bike stations are:

- a user pays service: the stations cost money to use, either through daily, weekly, monthly payments or through periodic memberships (though sometimes non-members can pay for daytime locker use).
- free-of-charge service: the bike stations are usually fully paid for by the local municipality, local regional government, or by the operating company (e.g. for bicycle parking stations located at railway stations)
- mixed system: some small charge may be required from the end-user (e.g. an administration charge) but the bulk of the operating costs are paid for by another entity.

== Construction costs ==
- The bike station in Washington, D.C., opened in 2009 and cost 4 million US dollars for 1,700 square feet (160 m^{2}) of space and storage for 150 bicycles.
- The King George Square Cycle Centre in Brisbane, Queensland opened in June 2008 and cost 7 million Australian dollars. It has 33 showers, 420 lockers, and parking for 420 bicycles in two-level racks.
- The bike station at Utrecht Railway Station in the Netherlands was completed in 2019 for around €30 million and holds 12,500 bicycles, making it the world's largest. It has three levels of double-decker bike racks, connected by gentle sloping ramps.
- The RBWH Cycle Centre in Brisbane opened in November 2009 and cost A$8 million. It has 40 showers, more than 900 lockers, and parking for 750 bicycles.
- The Parkiteer swipe card accessible bike cages of Victoria, Australia, which have at least 26 racks in them and cost approximately $AUD110,000 each.

== Bicycle parking stations around the world ==
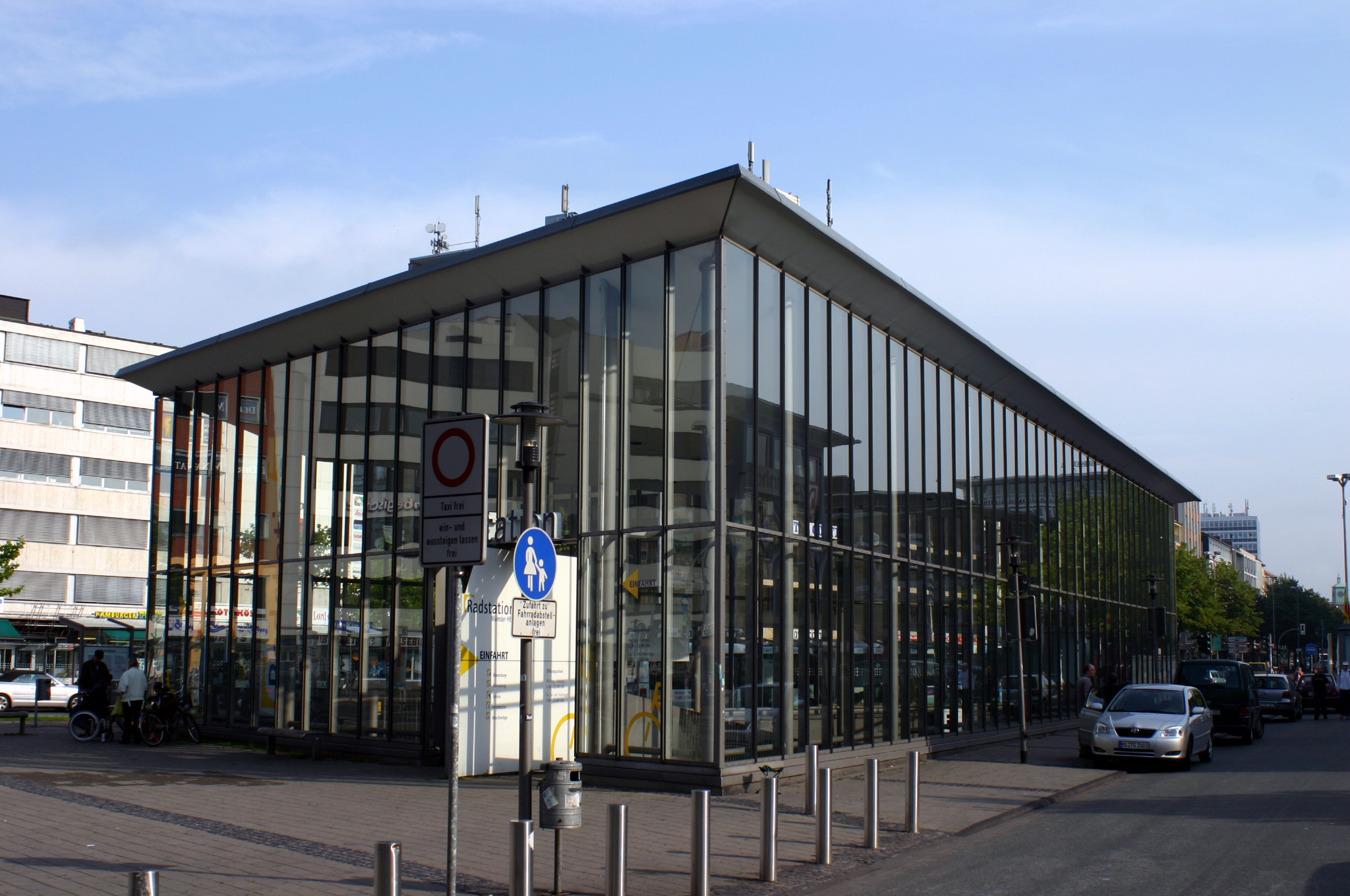
Radstation at Münster railway station, Germany.

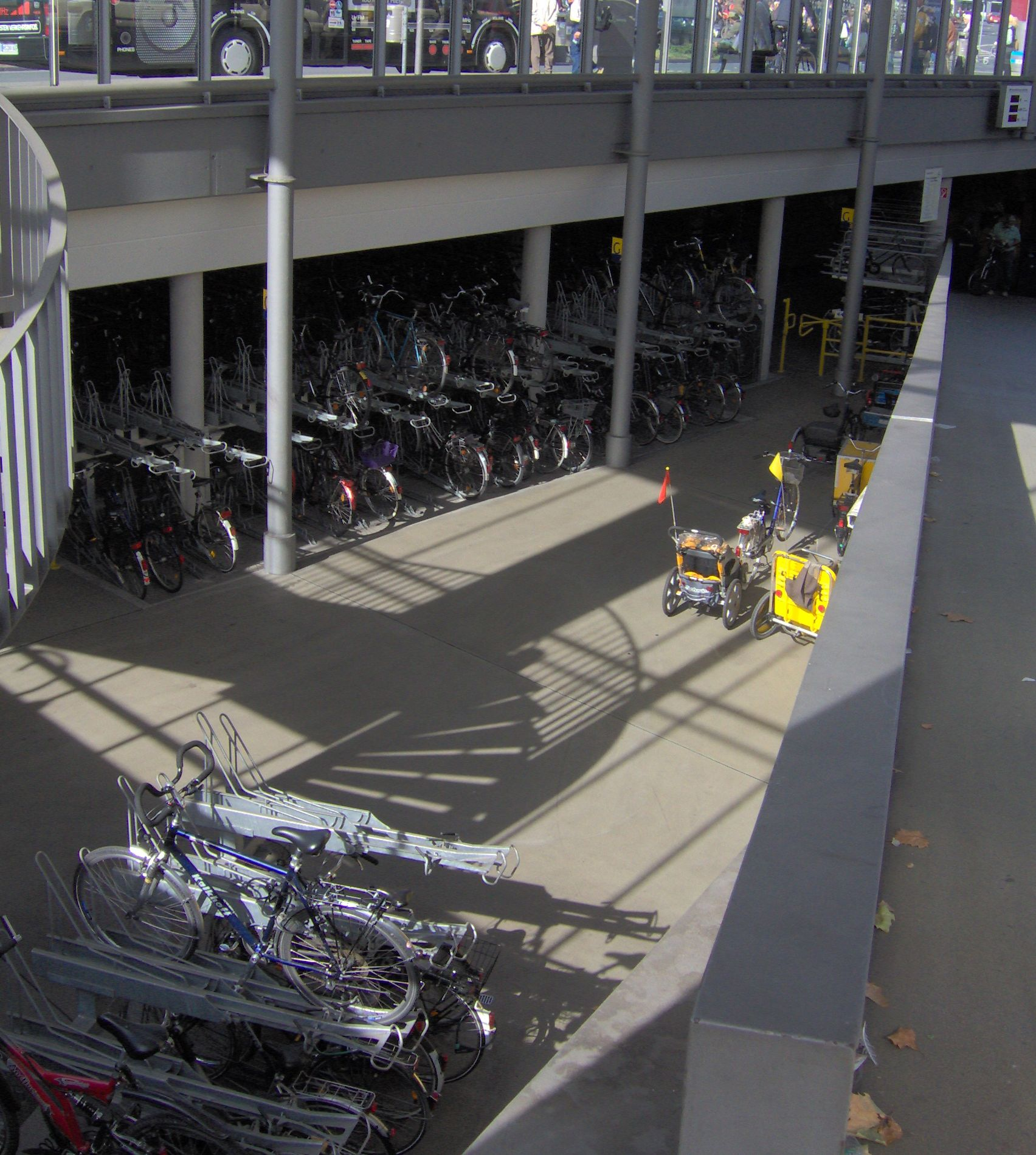
Interior of Radstation in Münster, Germany.

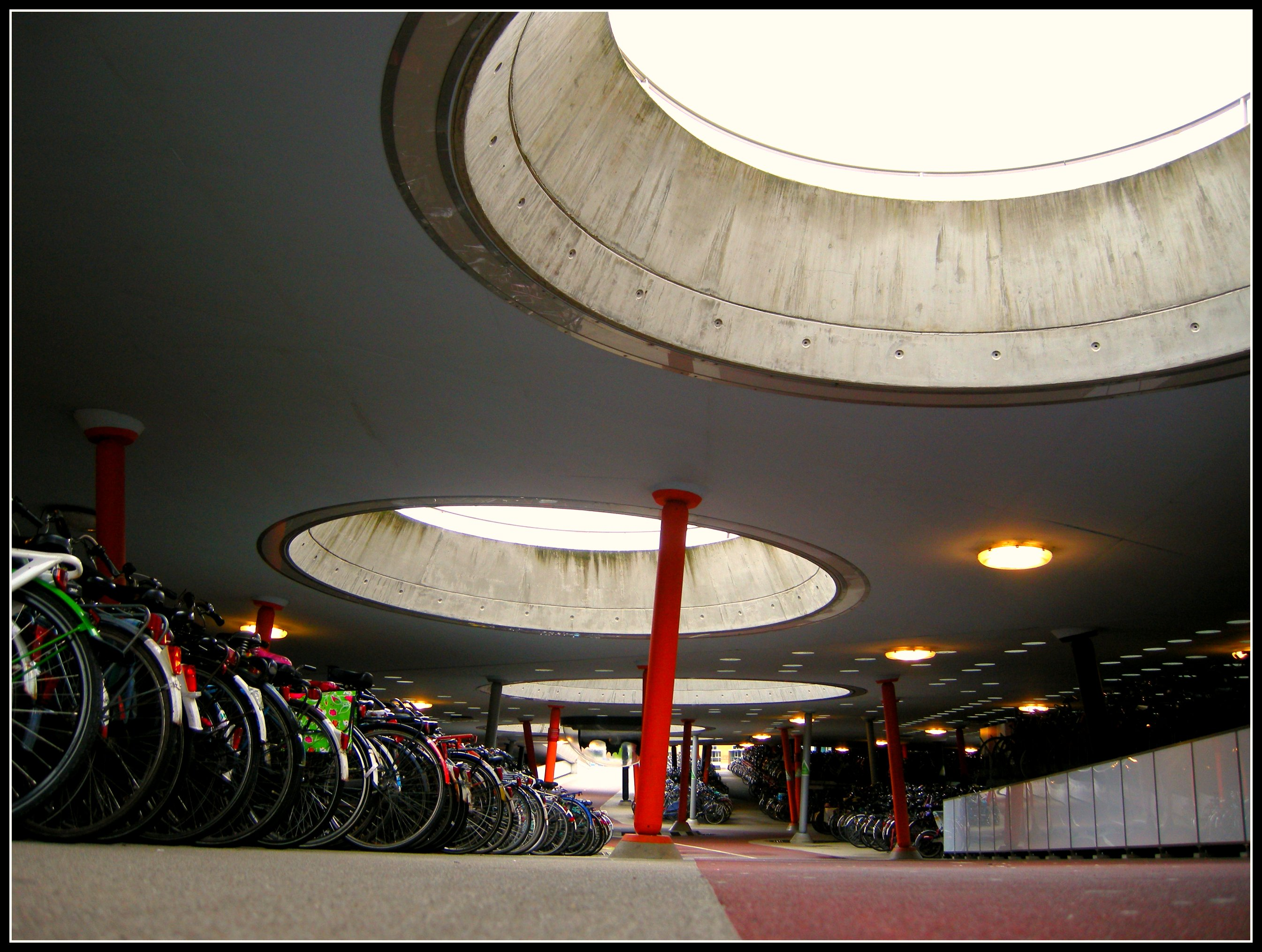
Underground bicycle parking next to Groningen railway station

Examples of stations include:

- Australia
  - Melbourne, Victoria - As of October 2024, there are more than 150 Parkiteer bicycle parking cages spread across Melbourne's 222 suburban rail stations, including 2 at park-and-ride bus stations. There are also 29 Parkiteers at V/Line regional rail stations across the state of Victoria. These cages are accessible via registered swipe card or NFC through a mobile app. Most have bike racks for 26 bicycles each, though some have capacity for up to 67 bicycles. Parkiteer facilities at railway stations are provided in addition to basic bicycle parking hoops situated in the open air at the same stations.
  - Brisbane, Queensland: air conditioned facilities with showers, lockers, maintenance and dry cleaning services
    - cycle2city, located at King George Square busway station in the CBD (also known as the King George Square Cycle Centre), with 420 places
    - RBWH Cycle Centre, located at the Royal Brisbane and Women's Hospital in Herston with 750 places
- Europe
  - Belgium
    - Ghent, Gent-Sint-Pieters railway station, under construction: two stations to host 17,000 bicycle parking spots in total.
  - Germany
    - Düren Fahrradparkhaus with 360 places
    - Münster, Radstation with 3,300 places, a new facility with 2,000 places on the other side of the railway station is under construction.
  - Netherlands
    - Amsterdam
      - Fietsparkeergarage Prins Hendrikplantsoen with 7000 places under construction.
      - Fietsenstalling IJboulevard with 4000 places under construction.
      - Fietsparkeergarage Strawinskylaan with 3750 places.
      - Fietsenstalling Leidseplein with 2000 places.
    - Arnhem Fietsenstalling Station with 4500 places.
    - Delft
      - Stationsstalling 1 with 5000 places.
      - Stationsstalling 2 with 2700 places.
      - Stationsstalling 3 with 2400 places.
    - Deventer Fietsenstalling Stationsplein with 3600 places.
    - Ede Fietsenstalling Station with around 5500 places.
    - Leeuwarden
      - Fietsenstalling station with around 3000 places.
    - Groningen
      - Stadsbalkon with around 5500 places.
      - Fietsenstalling station with around 5000 places under construction.
    - Leiden Lorentz with 4800 places.
    - Maastricht Fietsenstalling station with around 3000 places.
    - Nijmegen
      - Fietstransferium Doornroosje with 4000 places.
      - Fietsenstalling Station with 2600 places.
    - Rotterdam Centraal Station, with 5190 places.
    - The Hague Koningin Julianaplein with around 8000 places.
    - Tilburg
      - Stationsstalling Noordzijde with 3900 places.
      - Stationsstalling Zuidzijde with 3400 places.
    - Utrecht
      - Stationsplein, with 12,500 places it’s the world’s largest bicycle parking station and only one of about 20 stations with around 33,000 parking spots near Utrecht Central Railway Station.
      - Jaarbeursplein with 4200 places.
      - Knoop with 3200 places
    - Zwolle Fietsenstalling Stationsplein with 5475 places.
  - Spain
    - Blanes - Biceberg system at the bus station.
    - Huesca - Biceberg system on Av de Juan XXIII.
    - Vitoria - Biceberg system at Club Deportivo Mendizorrotza, Vitoria-Gasteiz.
    - Zaragoza - Biceberg system; one facility in Plaza San Pedro Nolasco, and a second facility in Calle Menéndez Pelayo.
  - United Kingdom
    - Greater Manchester - Transport for Greater Manchester has developed several Cycle Hubs.
    - Cambridge - The new station development contains around 3000 places.
- North America
  - Bikestation : Long Beach, Covina, Claremont, Santa Barbara, Palo Alto, CA, Washington DC, and Seattle WA.
  - Chicago, Illinois - The McDonald's Cycle Center in Millennium Park.
  - St. Louis, Missouri - Located downtown at 10th & Locust.
  - Vancouver, BC - Bike parkades are located at some SkyTrain and West Coast Express stations.
- South America
  - Mauá, a suburb southwest of São Paulo, Brazil at the Mauá railway station on Line 10 of the CPTM. video of the bike station on Streetfilms. This bicicletário (bike rack in Portuguese) is operated by ASCOBIKE, or Assoçiâo dos Condutores de Bicicletas.

== See also ==
- Cyclability
