= Cycling in Chicago =

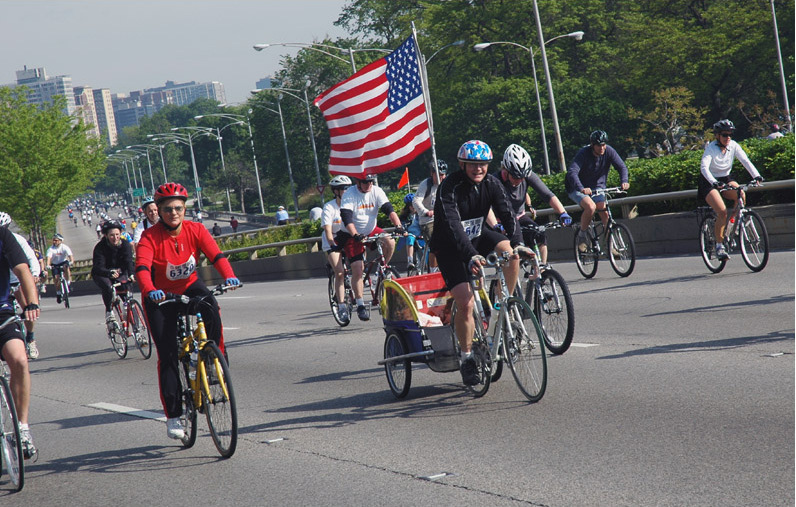
Bike the Drive 2005

Since the advent of the bicycle in the 1860s, Chicago has been distinguished as one of the premier cycling locations in the United States, with such public cycling destinations as Grant Park, Burnham Park and the Chicago Park District's Lakefront Trail.

== History ==
Early bicycles arrived in Chicago in the 1860s. By 1900, there were 54 bicycle clubs with more than 10,000 members. Bicycle advocacy has been present in Chicago since the early days of the city. Carter H. Harrison II, a mayoral candidate, was an advocate for cyclists. One of his campaign posters presented him as "Not the Champion Cyclist; But the Cyclists' Champion." Harrison won the mayoral election and attributed his victory to strong support from cyclists, and rewarded his supporters with a bike path along Sheridan Road from Edgewater to Evanston. By the late 1890s, Chicago was the "bicycle-building capital of America". According to the 1898 Chicago Bicycle Directory, approximately two-thirds of the country's bicycles and accessories were manufactured within 150 miles (240 km) of the city.

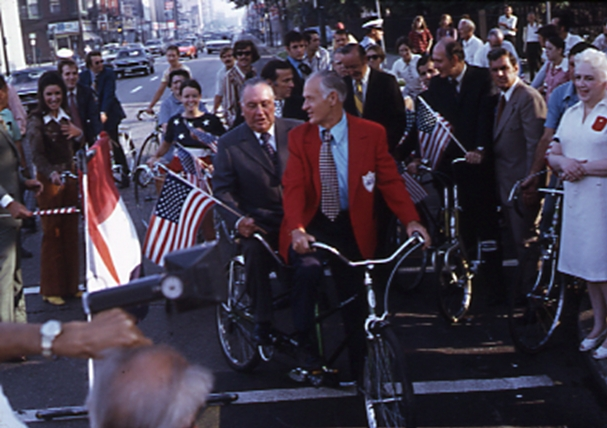
Former Mayor Richard J. Daley riding a Schwinn tandem with cycling advocate Keith Kingbay at the opening celebration of Clark Street bike lane.

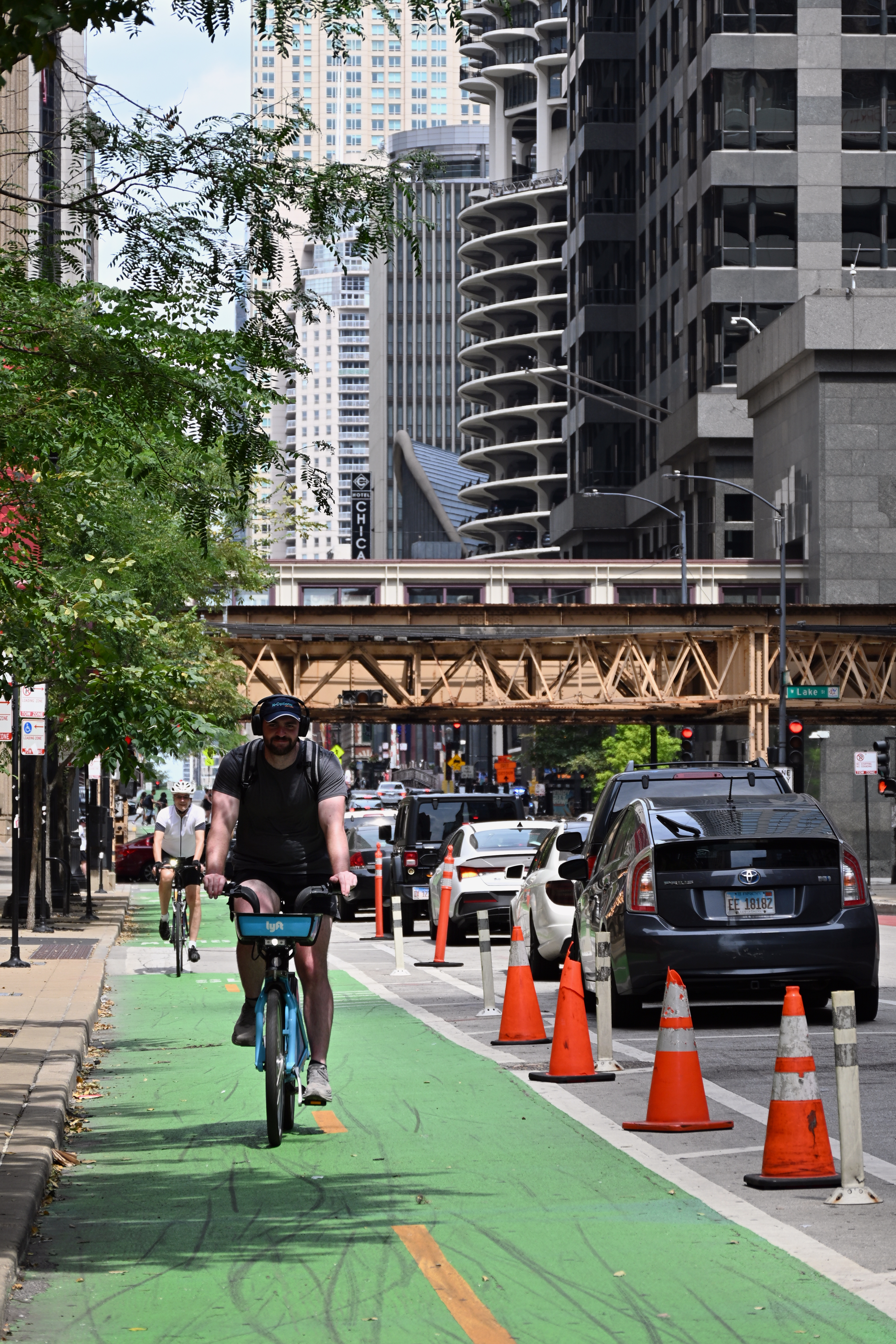
Protected bike lane on Dearborn Street in 2025.

Mayor Richard J. Daley, like Harrison, was a supporter of bicycling. When he was inaugurated, the city had a limited number of bike paths. By the 1970s, Daley's administration had built a large network of lakefront bike paths, bicycle lanes on the road, a 34-mile (55 km) bicycle route and rush-hour bicycle lanes on Clark Street and Dearborn Street.

In the 2000s, Chicago roads and trails saw an increase in the number of bicyclists. This can, in part, be attributed to mayor Richard M. Daley. Daley said, "My goal is to make the City of Chicago the most bicycle-friendly city in the U.S." Daley created a Mayor's Bicycle Advisory Council (MBAC) in order to encourage bicycling in the city.

The Council created the Chicago Department of Transportation Bike Program, a multimillion-dollar program funded primarily by Federal CMAQ funds, in order to achieve this end. The program, whose efforts are guided by the Bike 2015 Plan, approved in June 2006, has created over 100 miles (160 km) of new bike lanes, installed 10,000 bicycle racks, and installed 165 miles (266 km) of signed bike routes in 2006. The city has also sponsored events to promote biking, such as Bike The Drive, Bike to Work Rally, the L.A.T.E. Ride, the Commuter Challenge, and many other events. In November 2001, Bicycling magazine honored Chicago as the "Best Cycling City in the United States" of cities with more than one million residents.

== Bikes and transit ==
All Chicago Transit Authority (CTA) & Pace buses are equipped with bicycle racks that accommodate two bicycles each, available for use at all times. Bicycles are allowed to board any Chicago Transit Authority train ("the 'L'"), except during the hours of 7–9 am and 4–6 pm on weekdays, up to two bikes per car. Bicycles are not allowed on trains on July 3 or 4. Folding bicycles, however, are allowed on CTA vehicles at all times. Metra, the commuter rail system, allows bicycles to ride on reverse commute, non-rush hour, and weekend Metra trains for no extra cost. Metra timetables list certain blackout dates and specify which trips disallow bicycles; folding bicycles are allowed at all times. This policy began in 2005.

Most CTA rail stations have indoor, outdoor or outdoor sheltered bicycle parking. The Chicago Bicycle Program's Bike Parking website displays all stations and denotes the quantity and type of bicycle parking available. Most Metra stations have bicycle parking available.

Starting in 2008, high capacity bike parking was constructed at four CTA rail stations: Damen (CTA Blue Line), Sox-35th (CTA), Jefferson Park (Metra-CTA), and Midway (CTA).

== Bike sharing ==
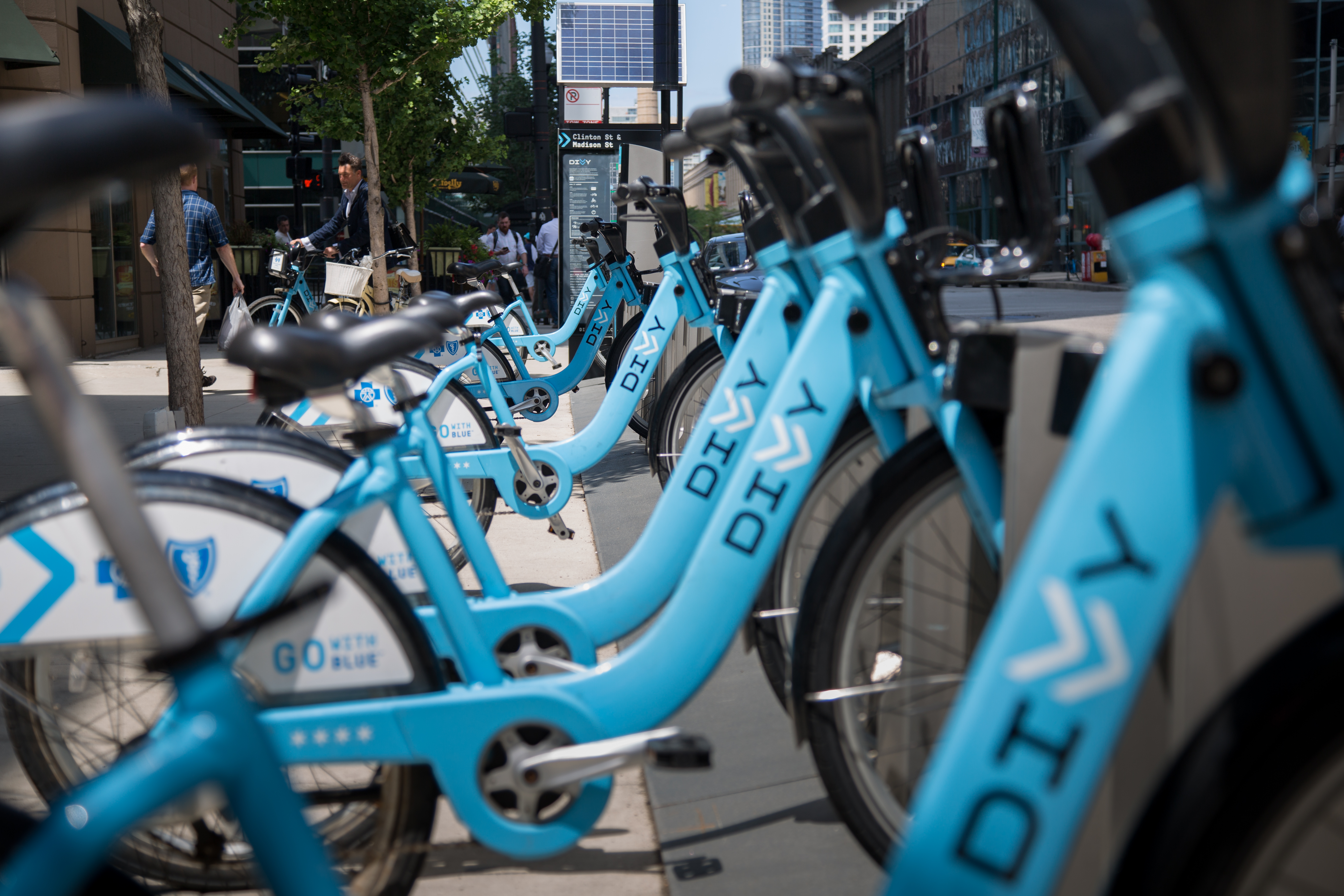
Divvy bikes at the intersection of Clinton and Madison streets

Divvy, a bicycle sharing system, was launched on June 28, 2013, with 750 bikes at 75 stations. It has since expanded to 580 stations, making it the largest bike share system in North America in area covered, including 2016 expansions to near suburban communities including Evanston and Oak Park. Oak Park ended its partnership with Divvy in January 2018, and the stations and bikes were subsequently removed soon after.

== Facilities ==
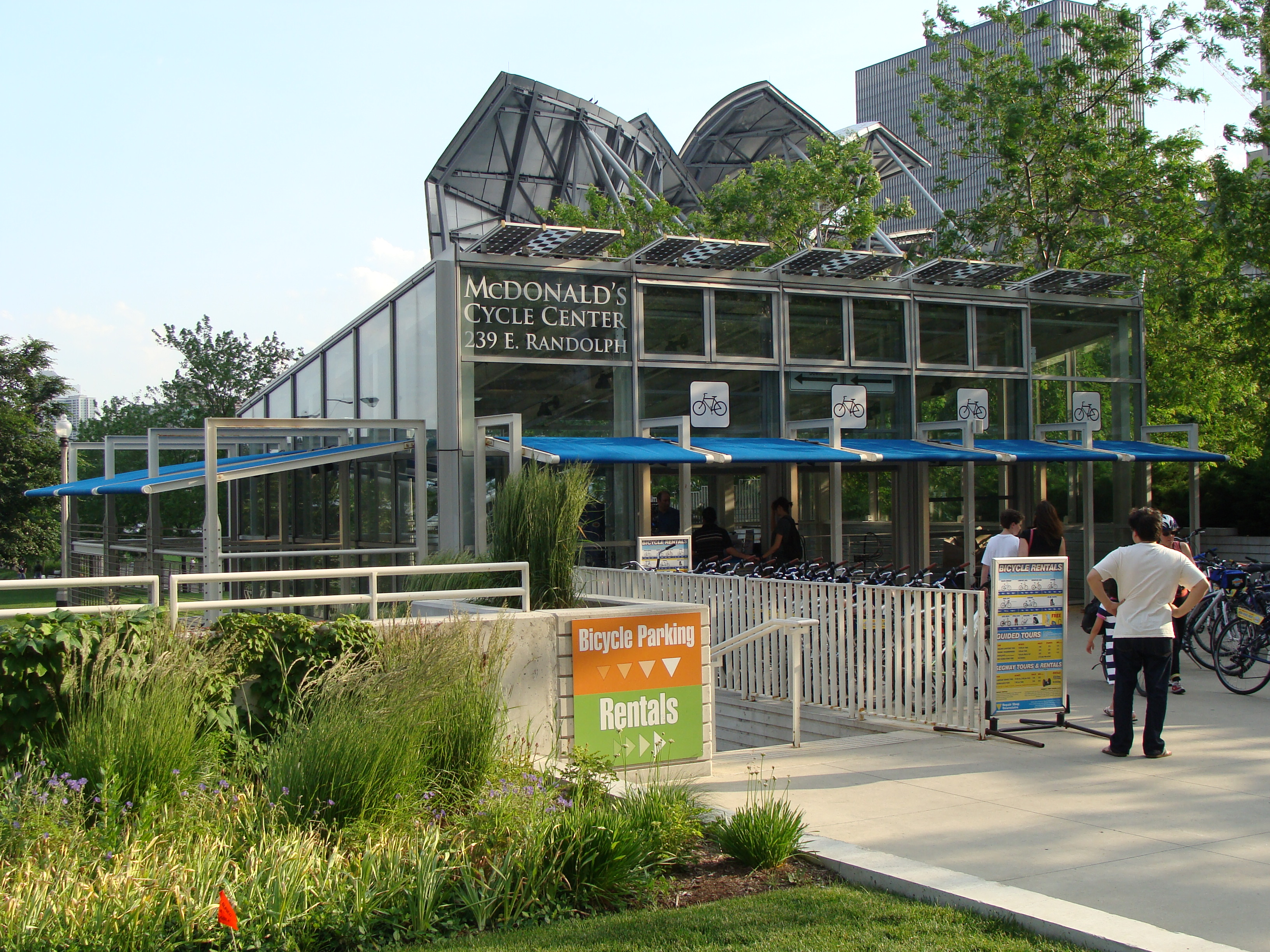
Chicago's McDonald's Cycle Center has been described as "the ultimate in bicycle stations."

According to the CDOT, Chicago has just over 111 miles (179 km) of dedicated bike lanes covering much of the city. There are also several miles of roads signed and marked with shared lane markings (consisting of bike and chevron symbols, or bike symbols and arrows). As of August 2008, there are approximately 27 miles (43 km) of these types of shared bike lanes throughout the city. The Milwaukee Avenue bike lane and marked shared lane is one of the most popular on-street bikeways in the city: between 2003 and 2008, the number of bicyclists riding on the street has increased 377%. CDOT is counting the number of bicyclists on other city streets in 2008 and 2009.

The City of Chicago publishes a Bike Lane Design Guide. The Bicycle Parking Program within the CDOT Bicycle Program lists almost 8,000 bike racks at over 4,000 locations in the city limits. More than half of the CTA 'L' stations have indoor or sheltered bike parking available to protect bicycles from inclement weather.

The McDonald's Cycle Center in Millennium Park was opened on July 16, 2004, just east of the Pritzker Pavilion. The building has indoor parking for bicycles, bicycle repair, showers, rental, lockers, and a cafe.

The Chicago Park District maintains an 18-mile multi-use path along Lake Michigan called the Lakefront Trail.

== Organizations ==
- The Active Transportation Alliance, formerly known as the Chicagoland Bicycle Federation, was founded in 1985 and is the largest member-supported bicycle organization in the Chicago region. ActiveTrans works heavily with the Chicago Bicycle Program.
- The Illinois Cycling Association focus on competitive cycling with links to several Chicago based racing clubs.
- The Chicago Cycling Club holds regular rides.
- The UIC College of Cycling promotes cycling at the University of Illinois at Chicago.
- Several grassroots organizations also exist to promote cycling in Chicago. The Cycling Sisters work to encourage women to ride more. Break the Gridlock works to reduce auto-dependence. West Town Bikes teaches kids and adults how to maintain their own bikes. Bike Winter holds workshops and fun events to keep people biking all year round. The Pilsen/Little Village Bicycle Alliance works to increase bicycling in those neighborhoods.
- The Evanston Bike Club has rides for every skill and level on the north side of the city.
- Bike Lane Uprising is a group that promotes safe bike riding in the city, including giving out thousands of bike safety lights for free and developing an easy-to-use website and phone app that allows anybody to submit a picture and information about unsafe biking infrastructure in Chicago and across the US.

== Events ==
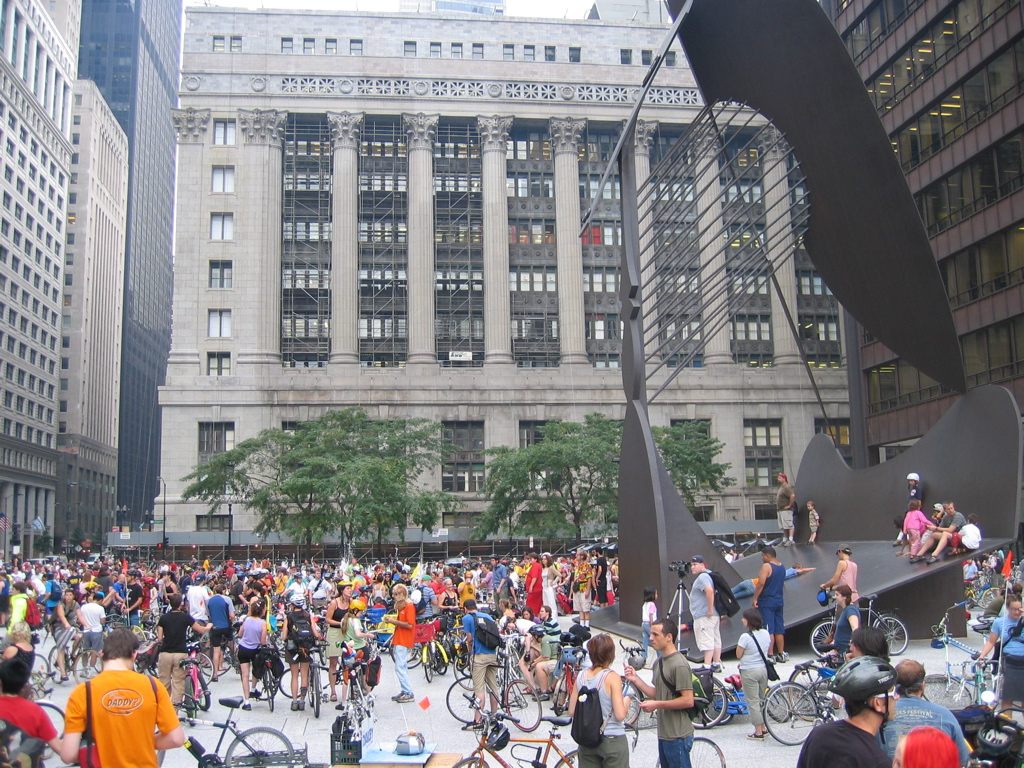
Critical Mass gathering in Daley Plaza

The monthly Critical Mass ride draws thousands of participants in the summer months. Participants gather at Daley Plaza on the last Friday of every month at 5:30 PM for a free ride.

The LATE Ride, sponsored by the Friends of the Parks, is an annual overnight tour of Chicago neighborhoods.

Active Transportation Alliance hosts its annual Bike The Drive and Boulevard Lakefront Tour.

Each summer, the Mayor's Office of Special Events (MOSE) hosts Bike Chicago, a series of bike friendly events around the city. MOSE and CDOT jointly operate the online calendar of events.
