= MB Financial =

American bank holding company

- Trade name: MB Financial
- Company type: Public
- Traded as: Nasdaq: MBFI
- Industry: Banking; Investment banking; Financial services
- Predecessor: Mid-City National Bank; Manufacturers National Bank
- Founded: 1911; 115 years ago
- Defunct: March 22, 2019; 7 years ago
- Fate: Bought by Fifth Third Bank
- Successor: Fifth Third Bank
- Headquarters: Chicago, Illinois, U.S.
- Area served: Regional
- Products: Consumer banking, corporate banking, private banking, financial analysis, insurance, investment banking, mortgage loans, private equity, wealth management, credit cards
- Revenue: $979 million (2018)
- Website: mbfinancial.com

MB Financial was a financial institution headquartered in Chicago, Illinois, until its purchase by Fifth Third Bank in 2018, which was then completed the following year. The bank previously sponsored Bike the Drive from 2010 through 2018, at which point Fifth Third took over the sponsorship upon the purchase's completion.
