= Chicago Lakefront Trail =

Shared-use path in Chicago, Illinois, US

Coordinates: 41.88275°N 87.61433°W

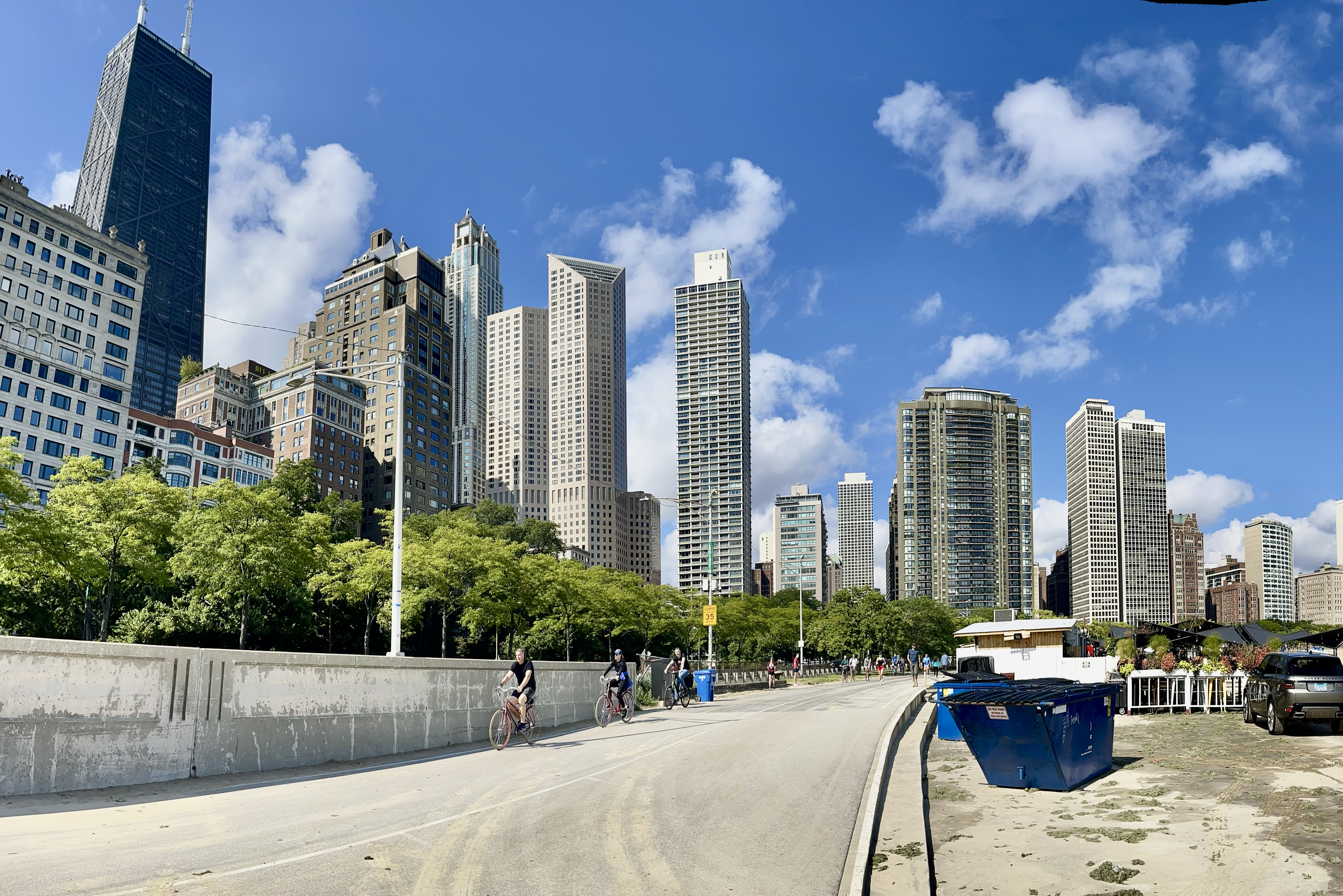
- Length: 18.5 miles (29.8 km)
- Location: Chicago, Illinois, US
- Established: 1963; 63 years ago
- Trailheads: Edgewater Beach/Lincoln Park (north) to; South Shore/Jackson Park (south)
- Use: Cycling, skateboarding, scootering, personal transporter, and pedestrians
- Difficulty: Easy
- Season: Limited access during winter
- Website: www.chicagoparkdistrict.com/parks-facilities/lakefront-trail

The Chicago Lakefront Trail (LFT) is a 18.5-mile-long (29.8 km) partial shared-use path for walking, jogging, skateboarding, and cycling, located along the western shore of Lake Michigan in Chicago, Illinois. The trail passes through and connects Chicago's four major lakefront parks along with various beaches and recreational amenities. It also serves as a route for bicycle, skateboard and personal transporter commuters. On busy summer days 70,000 people use the trail.

The LFT is located wholly within the Chicago city limits and spans from 7100 South/2560 East to 5800 North/1000 West. It is a dedicated-use path, although frequent intersections do pose a threat to path users. These intersections are clearly signed both to path users and motorists. From north to south, it runs through Lincoln Park, Grant Park, Burnham Park, and Jackson Park.

== History ==
In 1963, Mayor Richard J. Daley designated the LFT as the city's first official bike path. Over the years it grew in popularity. In 2017 and 2018 the Trail Separation Project sought to add capacity and increase safety by providing separation of bike and foot traffic lanes, utilizing both widened, dedicated lanes and in some areas newly constructed and separately dedicated path sections.

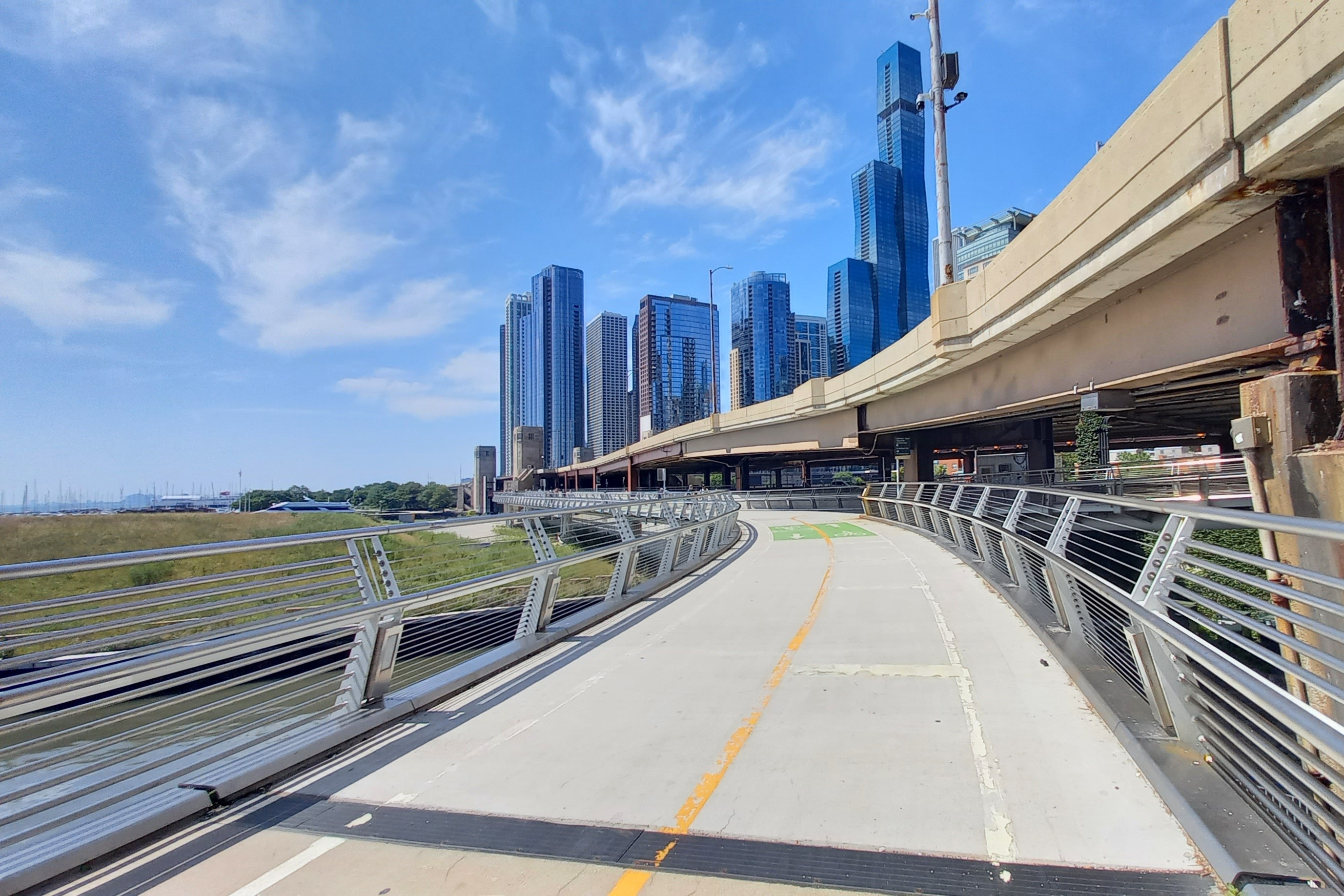
Navy Pier Flyover, July 2023

An additional improvement was added with the construction of the Navy Pier Flyover, a dedicated bridge over the Chicago River. From Wacker Drive to Illinois Street the Lakefront Trail shared the pedestrian sidewalk on lower-level Lake Shore Drive. In order to reduce the conflicts between pedestrians and bicyclists, and avoid the very busy intersections at Illinois Street and Grand Avenue, the Chicago Department of Transportation started designing the Navy Pier Flyover in 2000. This bridge runs alongside the upper level of Lake Shore Drive from north of the Ohio Street Beach to Illinois Street, and then alongside the lower level of Lake Shore Drive as it crosses the Chicago River, with an exit in the middle serving Navy Pier and DuSable Park. Construction began in spring 2014 and was originally planned to be completed in 2018. The project experienced multiple delays, but was finished in May 2021.

== Attractions ==
From south to north, attractions along the path include the South Shore Cultural Center, the Museum of Science and Industry, McCormick Place, Soldier Field, Chicago's Museum Campus, Monroe Harbor, Navy Pier, Belmont Harbor, and the Waveland Clock Tower. The Lakefront Trail connects most of the Chicago beaches and three skate parks (31st Street, Grant Park, Wilson Avenue). Several dog parks are accessible from the trail.

== Maintenance ==
Path maintenance is provided by the Chicago Park District. The Lakefront Trail is open 24 hours a day, but the parks and beaches along the path close at 11 PM.

== Gallery ==
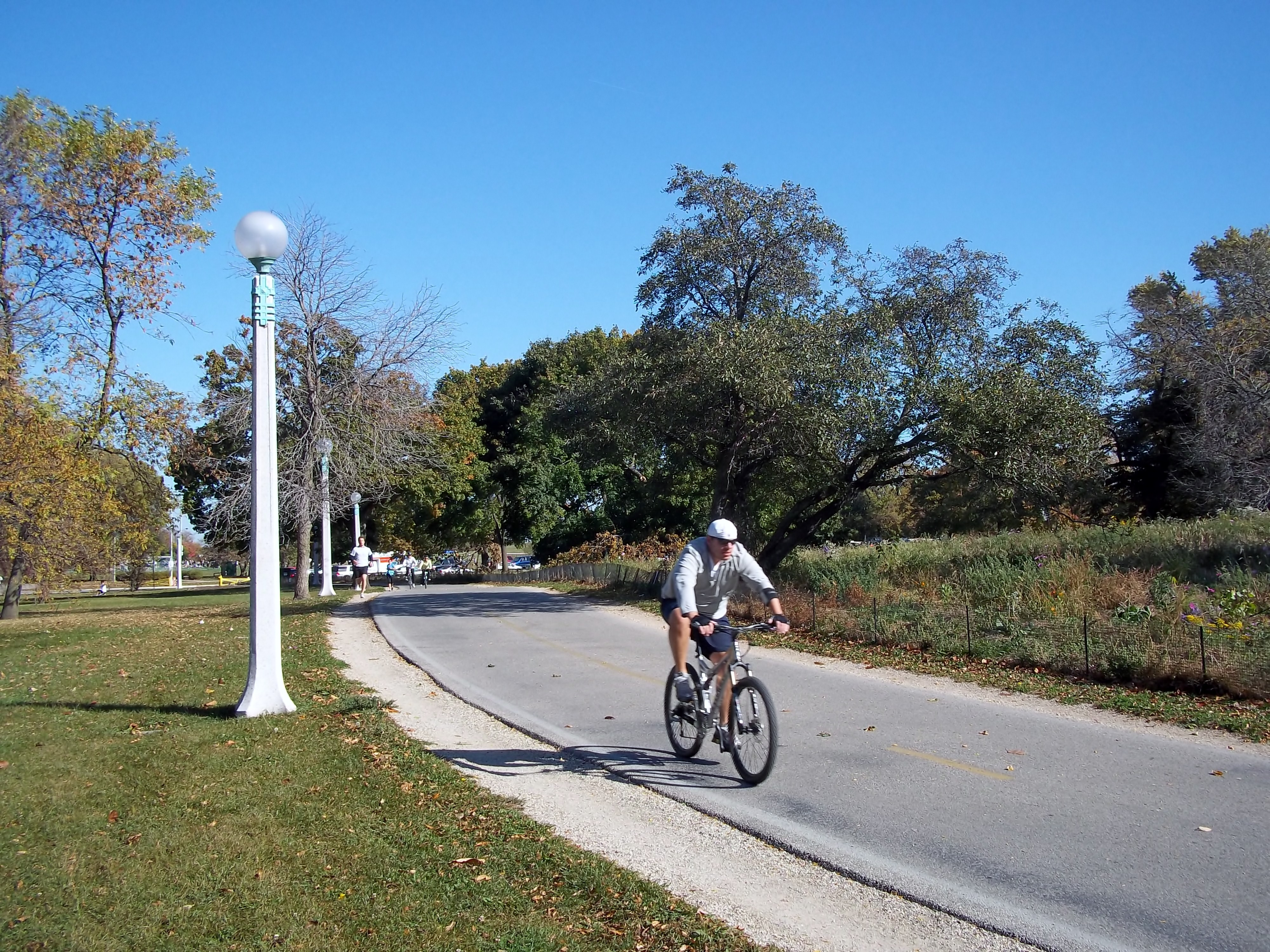

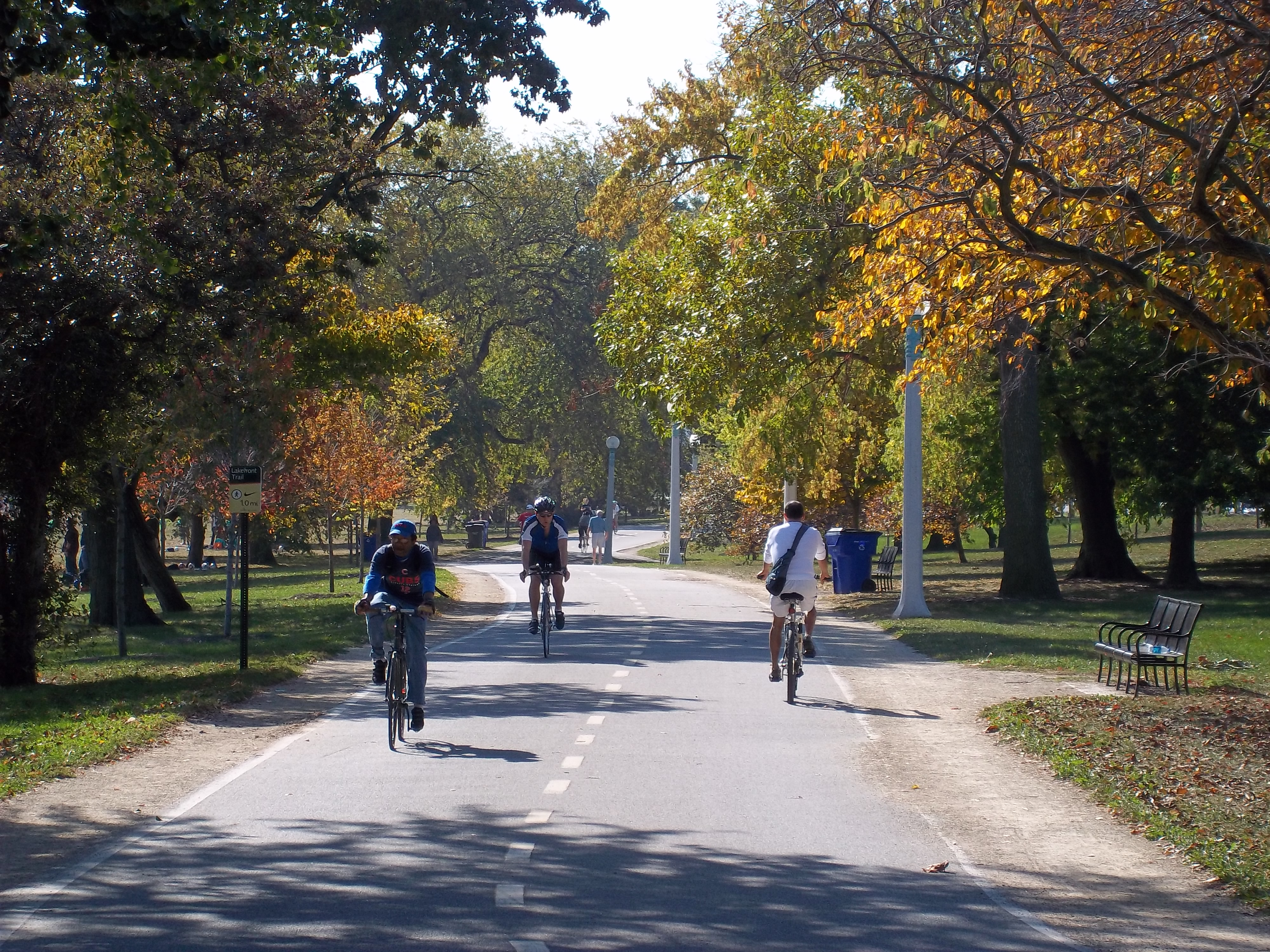

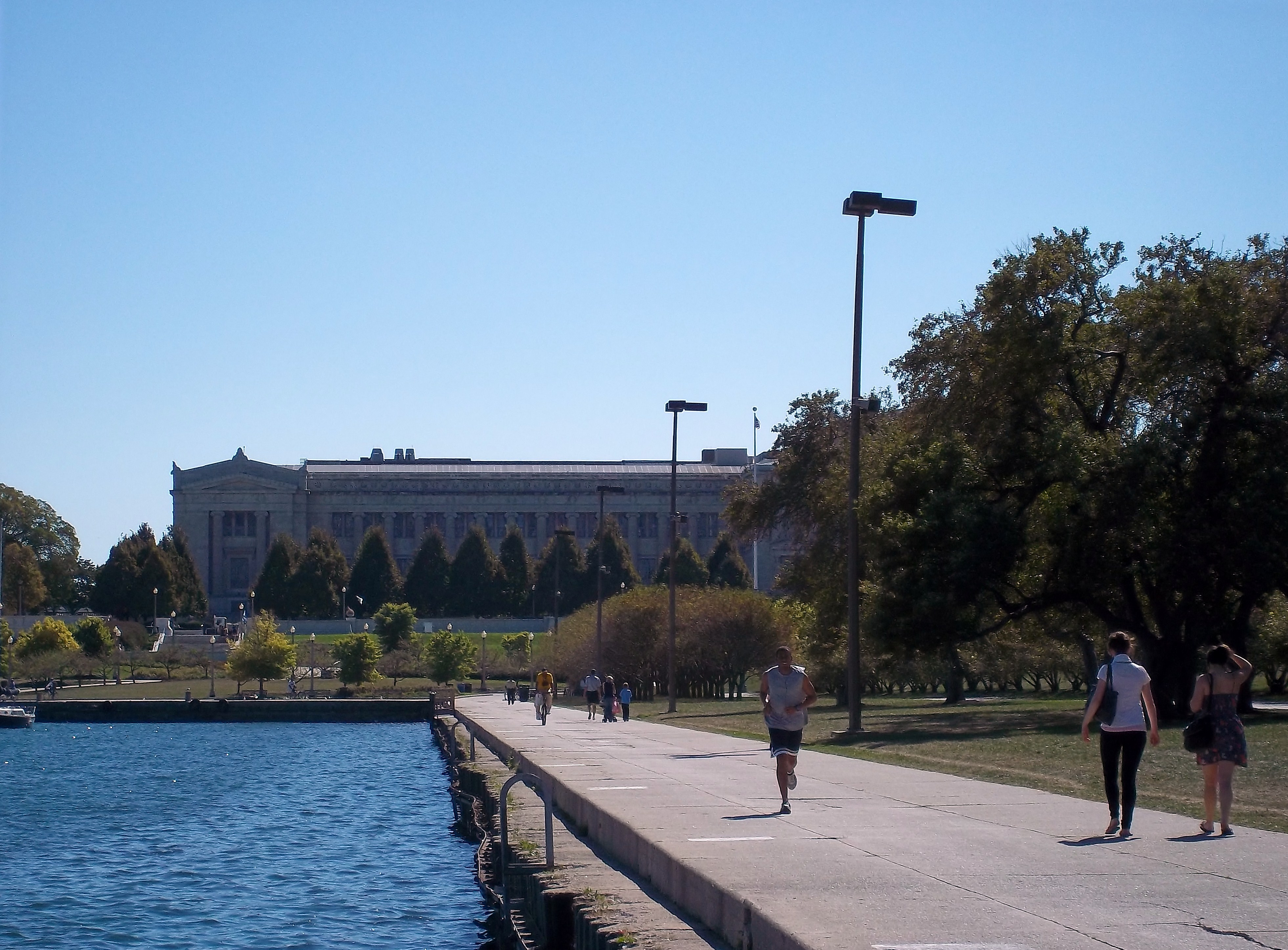

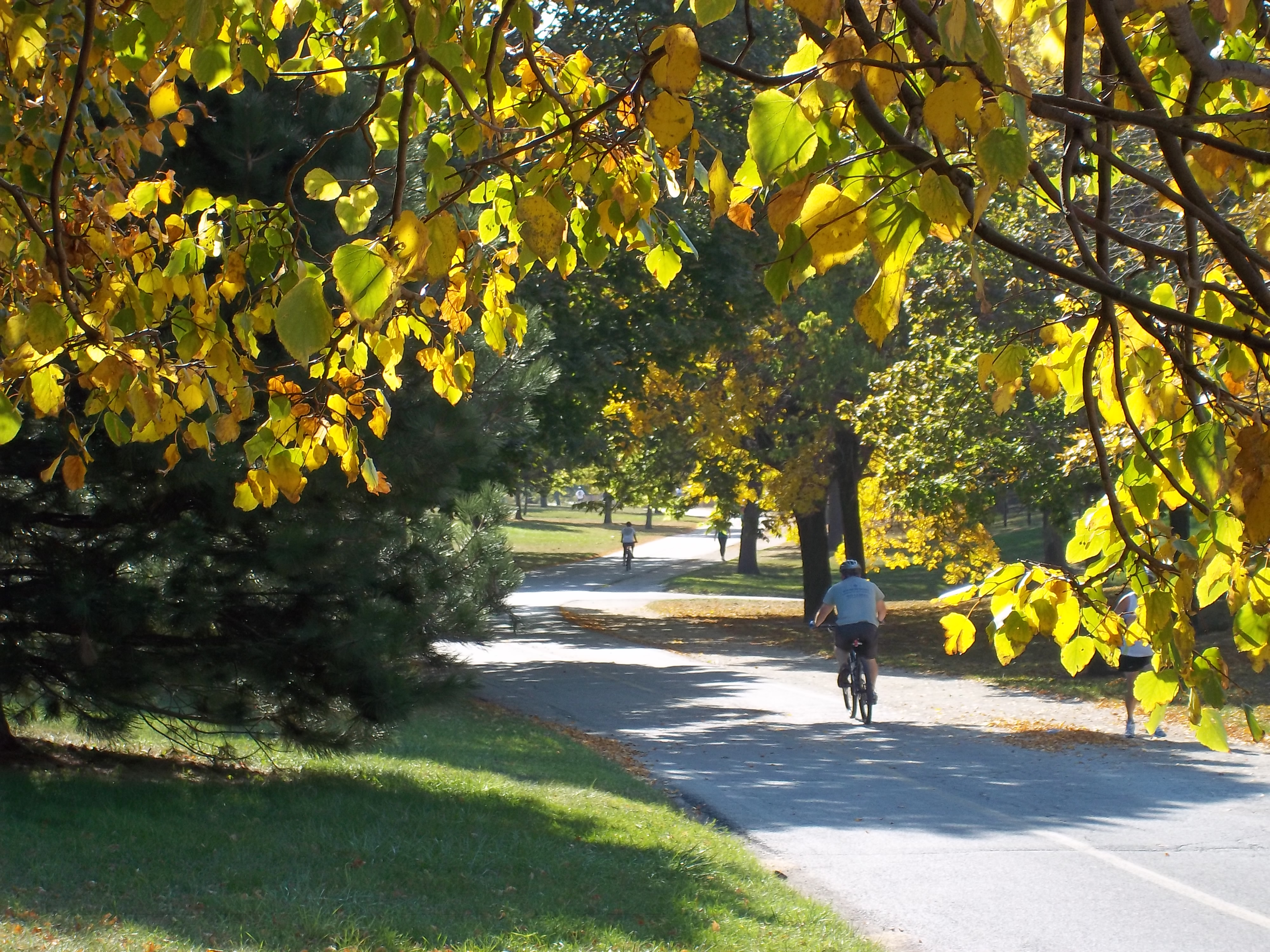

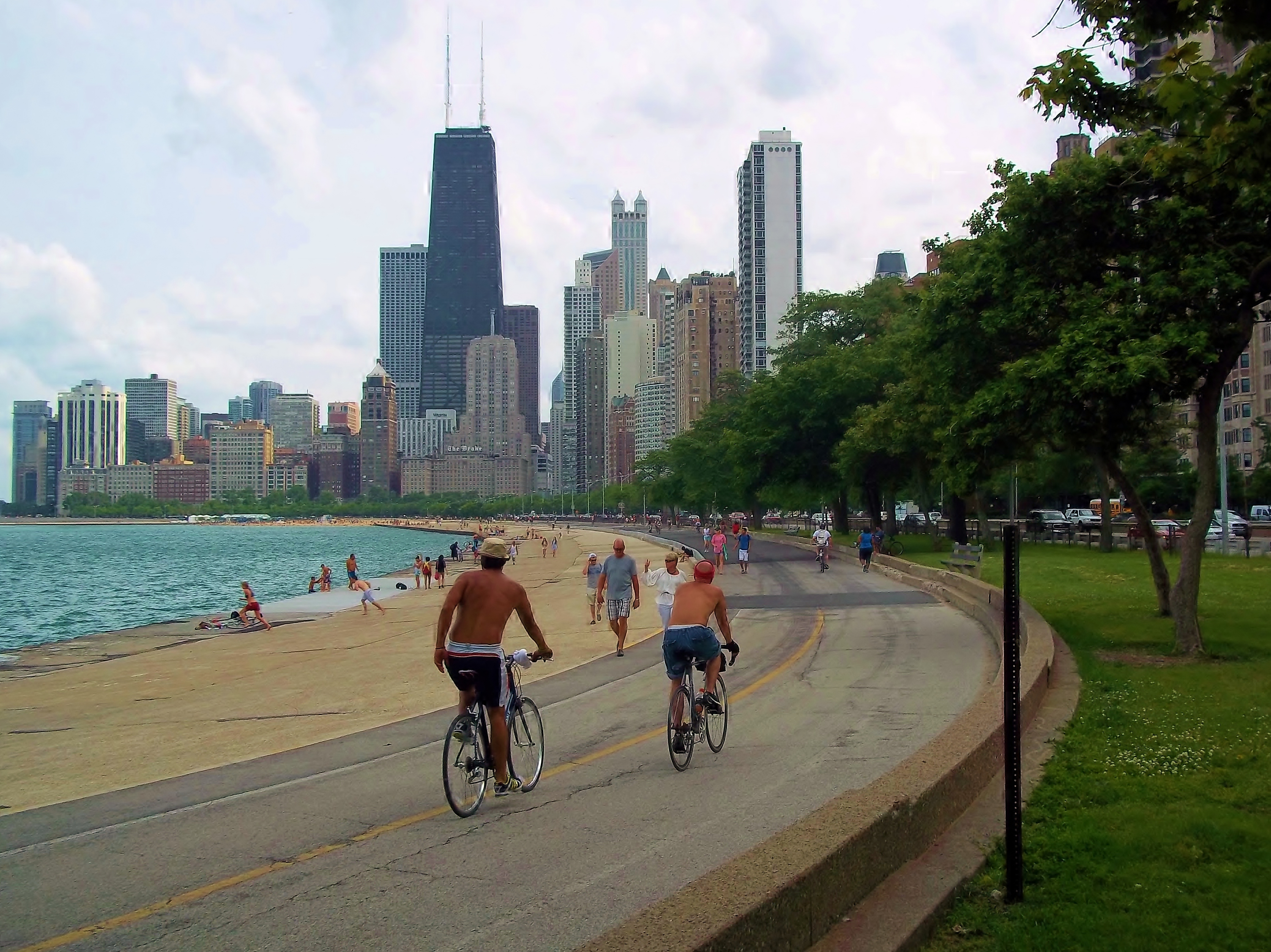

== See also ==
- Cycling in Chicago
- Illinois Prairie Path
- Bloomingdale Trail
