= Boulevard Lakefront Tour =

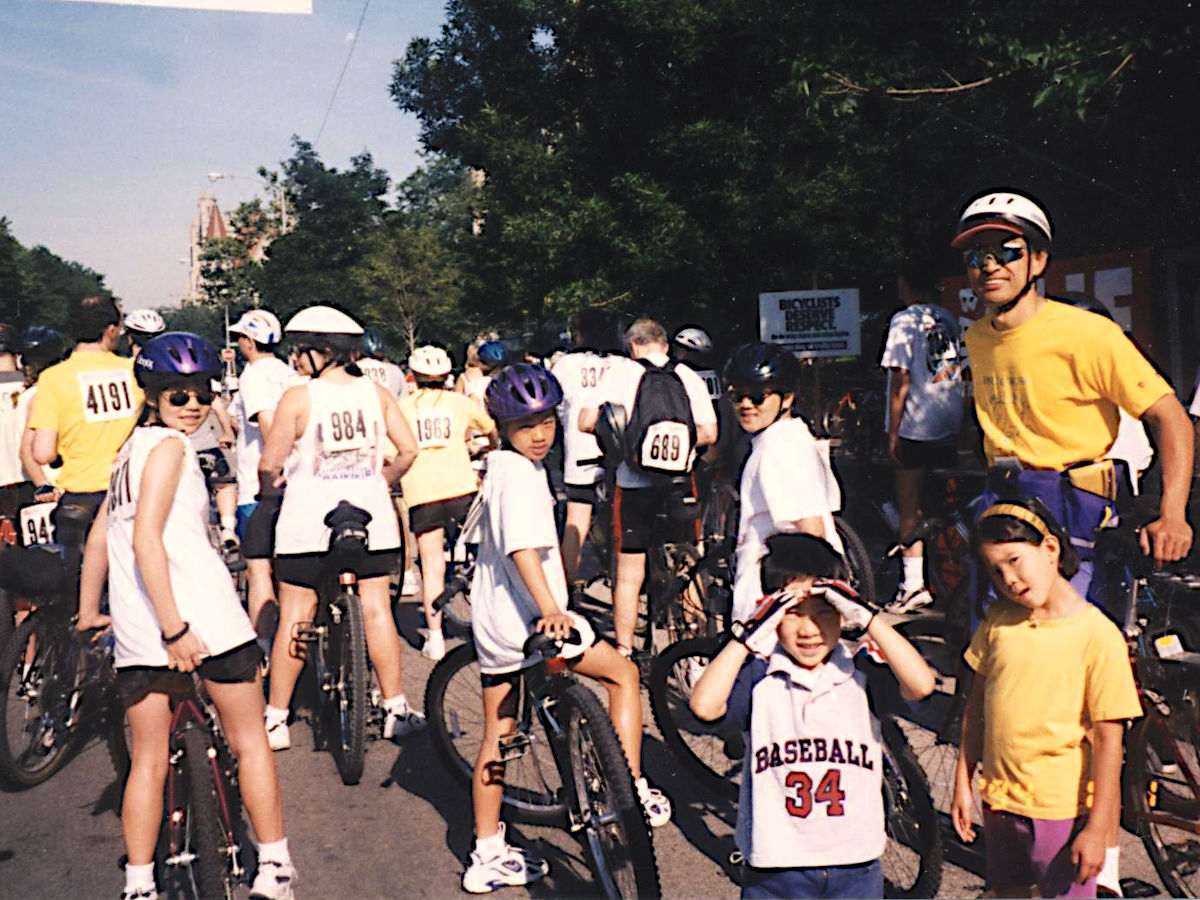
BLT start 1999

The Boulevard Lakefront Tour is a non-competitive bicycle ride on Lake Shore Drive and neighborhood communities in downtown Chicago, Illinois, presented by the law firm of Schwartz Cooper and the Active Transportation Alliance. The event includes 15-mile, 35-mile and 62-mile (or metric century) rides.

Nearly 2,200 riders participated in 2005, including several hundred who pedaled the new 62-mile (100 km) Chicago Cycling Club Metric Century.

== See also ==
- Bike the Drive
