= Keith Kingbay =

American road & track cycle racer (1914-1995)

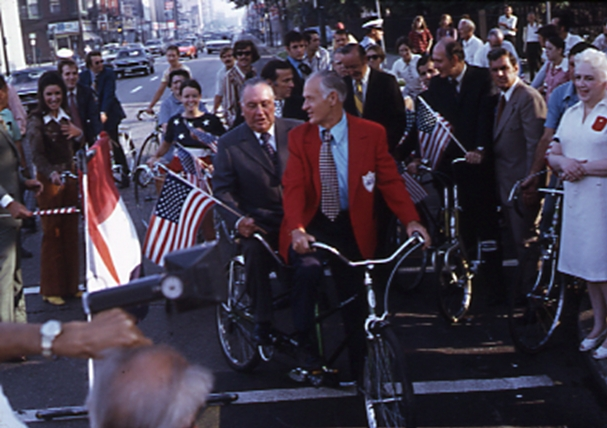
Kingbay riding a Schwinn tandem with Chicago Mayor Richard J. Daley at the opening celebration of Chicago's first bike lane.

Keith Kingbay (April 30, 1914 – January 16, 1995) was a racer, manufacturer, advocate, and author in bicycling. He was raised in Kenosha, Wisconsin, USA, and became a road and track racing cyclist in the 1940s before moving to Chicago to work for the Schwinn Bicycle Company.

== Schwinn ==
Kingbay took charge of the parts department before being put in charge of the Paramount manufacturing program in 1959 by Frank Schwinn. Kingbay became father of the Varsity and Continental, Schwinn's first derailleur-geared road bicycles. He convinced Schwinn to introduce the bikes and was said to have gotten the Huret brothers drunk over dinner in Chicago to convince them to come down in price for derailleurs.

Kingbay became Schwinn's cycling activities director, the "Ambassador of Bicycling", and traveled to dealers around the USA to promote cycling and lead rides. While Kingbay's PR duties at Schwinn were in support of Schwinn's bottom-line, he evolved into a general pro-bike advocate.

== Advocacy ==
In 1965, with Phyllis Harmon and Joe Hart, Kingbay reorganized the League of American Wheelmen and brought it to prominence as the League of American Bicyclists.(Name change happened in 1994, according to the LAB link.)

During his career as an advocate, Kingbay held the following positions:

- U.S. Cycling Federation (USCF) Treasurer
- member of the Board of USCF
- member of the United States Olympic Committee (USOC)
- chairman of the 1959 Pan American Games in Chicago
- member of the President's Council on Physical Fitness
- founder of the Illinois Cycling Association
- Cycling Activities Chairman of the League of American Wheelman

Bicycling, A Golden Guide, 1972.

== Authorship ==
Kingbay wrote several cycling publications, starting with the creation of a Schwinn Repair Manual in 1959. In 1972, he co-authored with George Fichter a Bicycling edition of the Golden Guide series of children's books. In 1976, he wrote the technique and safety guide Inside Bicycling (ISBN 0-8092-8029-9), and in 1978, he and Fichter teamed again to write Contemporary Bicycle Racing (ISBN 0-8092-7558-9).

== Honors ==
In 1977, he became inaugural recipient of the Dr Paul Dudley White Award, bestowed by League of American Wheelman (Bicyclists). In 1995, he was inducted into the United States Bicycling Hall of Fame. In the fall of 2005, he was listed in the Top 25 Change Agents for Cycling, published by the League of American Bicyclists of "25 people who indelibly changed the face of cycling in America." And on November 3, 2006, Kingbay was inducted as an inaugural member into the Chicagoland Bicycle Federation Hall of Fame for participating in that organization's founding in 1985.

Keith Kingbay remained a lifelong cyclist. He died on January 16, 1995, in Denver, Colorado.
