= Bike the Drive =

Non competitive bicycle ride in Chicago

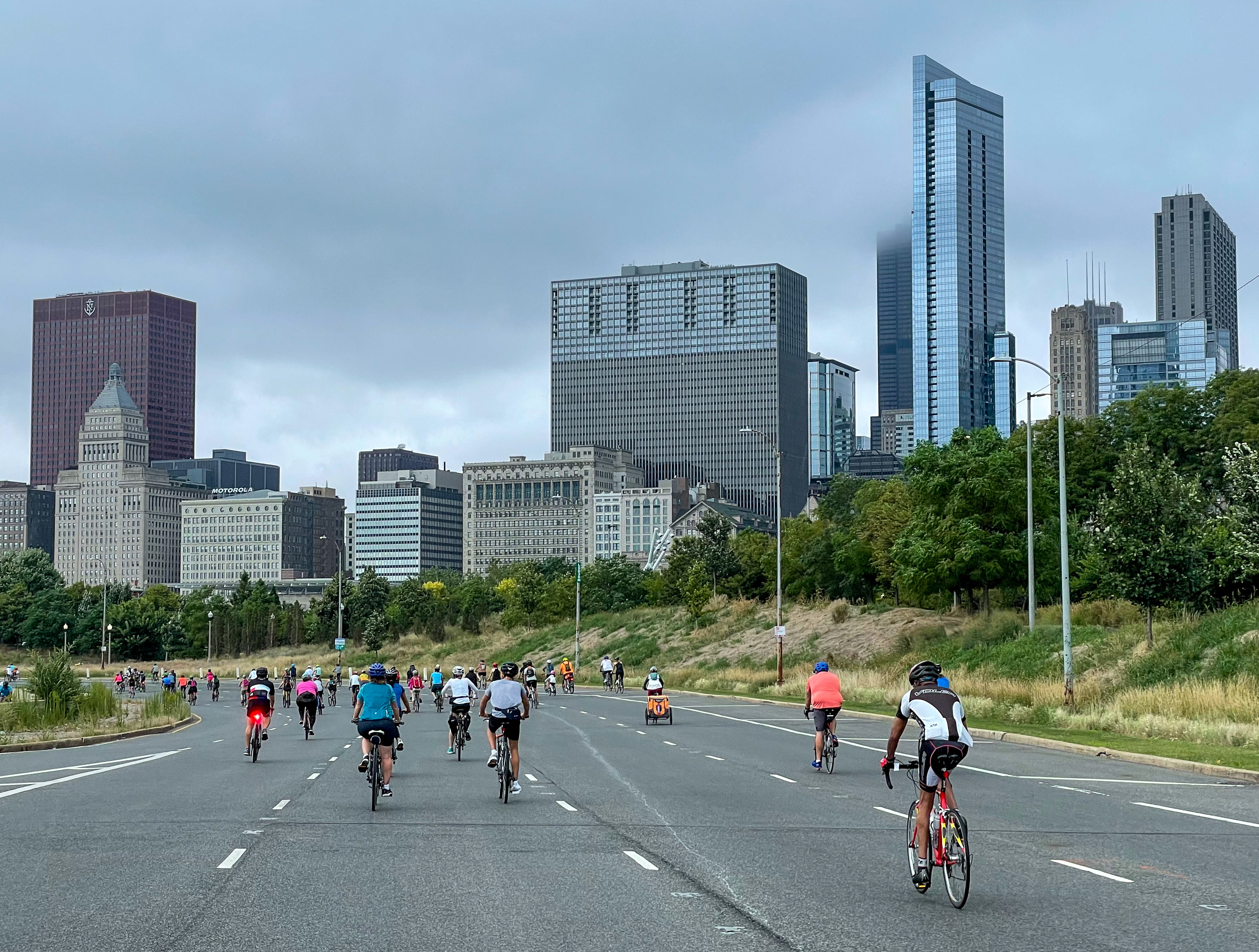
- 2022 ride
- Status: Active
- Genre: Recreational, non-competitive bicycle ride
- Frequency: Annually on Labor Day weekend
- Venue: Lake Shore Drive
- Locations: Chicago, Illinois
- Coordinates: 41°55′55″N 87°37′55″W
- Country: United States of America
- Inaugurated: June 9, 2002; 24 years ago
- Attendance: approximately 20,000
- Organiser: Active Transportation Alliance; City of Chicago
- Website: bikethedrive.org

Bike the Drive is a recreational, non-competitive bicycle ride held annually the Sunday before Labor Day in Chicago. DuSable Lake Shore Drive is cleared of motor vehicle traffic and opened exclusively to bicyclists for several hours beginning at dawn. The main festival and starting location is at Butler Field in Grant Park. The event benefits bicycling advocacy work in the region by the Active Transportation Alliance, formerly known as the Chicagoland Bicycle Federation. The event has been sponsored by Fifth Third Bank, MB Financial Bank (2010-2018) and Bank of America (before 2010).

== Route ==
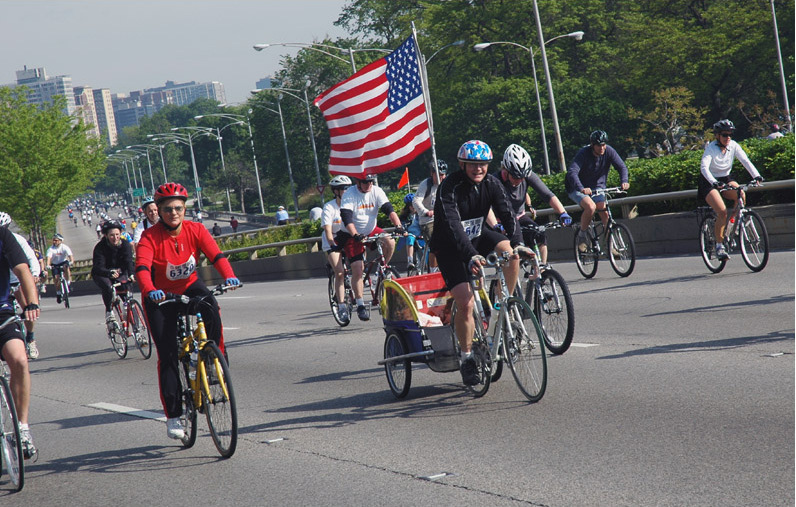
2005 ride

The route extends nearly the entire length of the famous roadway, from 57th Street on the South Side to Bryn Mawr Avenue on the North Side. The maximum route length is 30 miles (48 km), with riders beginning at Grant Park, going to the south and north extremes, and then returning to the starting point. Rest areas with refreshments and repair services are located at the north and south ends of the route, as well as the starting point. In addition, volunteers riding with the participants and stationed along the route offer assistance to riders. A festival in Grant Park follows the event, and includes music, food, cycling-related activities, and vendors and exhibitors.

== History ==
Bike the Drive was launched by the Chicagoland Bicycle Federation in 2002 to raise funds for programs to expand the Chicago area's bicycle transportation network, promote bicycling as a mode of transportation, improve bicycling conditions and traffic safety, and provide bicyclists with a variety of resources and support.

The event is organized in coordination with the City of Chicago, its agencies and departments.

In 2020 the event was cancelled due to the COVID-19 pandemic. In 2021, the ride was moved from the Sunday before Memorial Day to the Sunday before Labor Day, and has since made the move permanent.

== Past event dates ==
- June 9, 2002
- June 15, 2003
- May 30, 2004
- May 29, 2005
- May 28, 2006
- May 27, 2007
- May 25, 2008
- May 24, 2009
- May 30, 2010
- May 29, 2011
- May 27, 2012
- May 26, 2013
- May 25, 2014
- May 24, 2015
- May 29, 2016
- May 28, 2017
- May 27, 2018
- May 26, 2019
- September 5, 2021
- September 4, 2022
- September 3, 2023
- September 1, 2024
- August 31, 2025

== See also ==
- Cycling in Chicago
- Boulevard Lakefront Tour
