= Boub v. Township of Wayne =

- Court: Supreme Court of Illinois
- Full case name: JON P. BOUB, Appellant, v. TOWNSHIP OF WAYNE et al., Appellees
- Decided: October 22, 1998
- Citation: 183 Ill. 2d 520, 702 N.E.2d 535 (1998)

Court membership
- Judges sitting: Miller (and 3 others); Heiple, Harrison, Nickels—dissenting

Case opinions
- Municipalities are not liable for the damages that cyclist suffer on the roads

Keywords
- Liability; municipalities; roads; cyclists

Boub v. Township of Wayne is a ruling of the Supreme Court of Illinois made in 1998, where it was held that municipalities are not liable for the damage cyclists suffer on the poorly maintained roads. The cyclists were ruled "permitted, but not intended, users of the roads" in the state of Illinois. Under the state law, municipalities have a duty to maintain local roads in a safe condition. However, they are liable for damages only if the use of a road was both permitted and intended. The justices were sharply divided on the issue—four of them voted for the decision and three against. The dissenters called the decision "absurd and dangerous".

The case originated from an incident on September 8, 1992 in which the cyclist Jon Boub was riding over a bridge in the Township of Wayne, DuPage County. The bridge was being renovated at the time, and the asphalt had been partially removed from the road bed, revealing gaps between the wooden planks. When the front wheel of the Boub's bike "became stuck between two of the planks", he was thrown off the bike, hit the steel railing of the bridge, and received severe injuries. Boub sued the Township of Wayne on September 23, 1993 claiming negligence on the part of the municipality. The lawsuit was dismissed by the lower courts and subsequently appealed to the Supreme Court of Illinois.

== Effect ==
The decision created a disincentive for Illinois municipalities to declare roads safe for cyclists. Over a seven-year period, the Illinois General Assembly tried several times to change the law, without success.
