= L.A.T.E. Ride =

The L.A.T.E. Ride was an annual, non-competitive, mass bike ride through the streets of Chicago, Illinois, United States. It historically started about 1:00 am (but started at midnight in 2010) and finishes at about sunrise. It was a charity ride benefiting Friends of the Parks, a not-for-profit parks advocacy group in Chicago. The event's title was a backronym, Long After Twilight Ends. The Ride's director from its inception in 1989 until 2012 was Nancy Minster Swabb. The final LATE Ride was in 2016. It was originally promoted with the name "Insomnia Cycle", but that changed sometime in the mid 1990s.

In 2006, 9,000 people (ranging in age from 5 to 75) participated. The majority of riders and volunteers come from Chicago, its suburbs and Northwest Indiana; however, other participants have been from faraway parts of the US and the world.

The Ride started and ended in downtown Chicago at Buckingham Fountain in Grant Park at Congress and Columbus Drive (500 S. Columbus Drive), right across from Lake Michigan. The route is 25 miles, through areas of downtown Chicago, and various neighborhoods, but changed every few years, one year taking place on Lake Shore Drive.

In December 2016, ride organizers announced through social media the ride would not return in 2017.

== Sponsorship ==
Corporate sponsorship included "title sponsor" positions for major contributors. From 2006-2009, McDonald's was the title sponsor. Other major sponsors have included: Peoples Gas, Sports Authority, Village Cycle Center, WXRT, CBS 2, and Jewel.

== Ride information ==
For registered riders:

- Live music was played before the ride.
- There were midnight snacks before the ride.
- About midway through the ride, there was a rest stop with toilets, food, and water.
- Roving medical and bike repair services were available throughout the ride.
- A light breakfast was served at the end of the ride.
- In 2010, there was an optional all-you-can-eat pancake breakfast (fee of $7).
- Prizes were awarded for Best Lit Bike and Best Decorated Helmet.
