= Active Transportation Alliance =

Non-profit organization in Chicago, Illinois, US

- Predecessor: Chicagoland Bicycle Federation
- Founded: 1985; 41 years ago
- Type: Non-governmental organization
- Purpose: biking, walking, transit
- Location: Chicago
- Coordinates: 41.8866261°N 87.6289914°W
- Region served: Chicago metropolitan area
- Website: activetrans.org

Active Transportation Alliance (formerly Chicagoland Bicycle Federation) is a non-governmental, not-for-profit 501(c)(3) organization with a mission to promote better biking, walking, and transportation options.

The group publishes the Chicago Bike Map with Chicago Department of Transportation.

Its advocacy efforts include:

- Large-scale bike sharing
- Car-free Streets
- Fair Fares Chicagoland
- Chicago Streets for Cycling Plan 2020
- Improving the Chicago Lakefront Trail
- Transit Future

== Events ==
Active Transportation Alliance is involved with organizing many different events, some of which include:

- Bike the Drive
- Boulevard Lakefront Tour
- Chicago Bike Week
- Winter Bike Challenge

== Leadership ==
In 2020, Amy Rynell was named executive director of Active Transportation Alliance. Luann Hamilton serves as president of the board.
