= Gabe Klein =

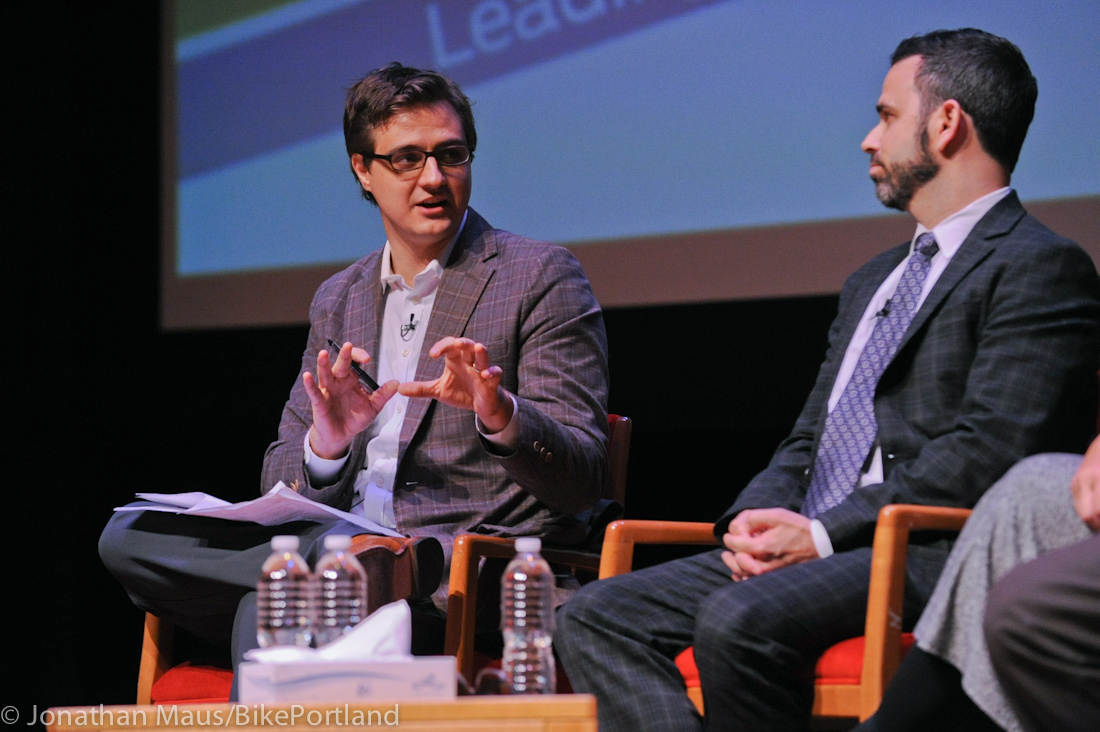
MSNBC's Chris Hayes (Left) with Chicago DOT Commissioner Gabe Klein (Right)

Gabe Klein is a government official, urban planner, entrepreneur, and an investor specializing in sustainability and transportation.

Klein served in the Biden Administration as the head of the Joint Office of Energy and Transportation. In this role, he worked to enable the roll-out of a national electric vehicle charging network and electric school and transit busses in the U.S. Klein–who supported a $19 billion budget in this position–was the first-ever Executive Director of the Joint Office, also the first office in the federal government to span multiple agencies.

Previously, Klein co-founded Cityfi, a consultancy that works with local governments, foundations, and venture-backed startups. He was also the Commissioner of the Chicago Department of Transportation (CDOT), and the Director of the District of Columbia Department of Transportation (DDOT). Before those roles, Klein was an Executive with Boston-based Zipcar. He authored the book Start-Up City: Inspiring Private and Public Entrepreneurship, Getting Projects Done, and Having Fun.

== Early life ==
Gabe Klein was born in Hartford, Connecticut. At 10, he studied under Swami Satchidananda Swami Satchidananda at the Yogaville Vidyalayam interfaith school in Buckingham County, Virginia. He graduated from Virginia Tech in 1994 with a degree in marketing management.

== Early career ==
Gabe Klein's career began working as Director of Stores for Bikes USA, the largest bike retailer in the 1990s.

In late 2002, Klein was hired by Zipcar Founder Robin Chase to help scale the company, which had less than 30 cars in Washington D.C. and under 150 cars nationally. As regional Vice President, he convinced the D.C. government to give Zipcar on-street parking, and oversaw a team that developed models for fleet management, operations, and marketing.

Concurrently, Klein co-founded On The Fly, an electric vehicle vending company, with electric food trucks called SmartKarts that drove on the streets and sidewalks, serving local, fresh, and natural food in the Washington, DC area. On the Fly was one of the first multi-unit and multi-channel food truck companies in the United States, with brick and mortar stores and mobile catering options launched in 2008.

=== Washington, D.C. ===
Klein was appointed by Mayor Adrian M. Fenty as the Director of the District of Columbia Department of Transportation (DDOT) in December 2008, and served until the end of Fenty's term on December 31, 2010. Klein immediately solicited feedback from progressive City Council members, smart growth organizations, and people in the smart cities and transportation space nationally in order to reinvent the agency as a customer-focused operation.

After months of work, Klein and the DDOT team released their first "Action Agenda", modeled on the New York City Sustainable Streets plan released the previous year, which established a roadmap for 1-2 year sprints to accomplish goals. Klein treated DDOT more like a startup than a slow-moving government agency, and oversaw the following new and ongoing initiatives:

- SmartBike DC and Capital Bikeshare
- The DC Streetcar Vision Plan
- DC Circulator Bus System
- 11th Street Bridges
- Protected Bicycle Lane Program
- Pennsylvania Avenue Bike Lanes
- Great Streets Program
- Parking Reinvention Program (including pay by phone)
- Online Public Space Permitting System (TOPS)
- GoDCGo Transportation Demand Management Program
- District Transportation Access Portal (Public Capital Program Dashboard)
- DC Action Agenda
- DC Action Agenda 2010 Update

=== Chicago ===
In May 2011, Klein joined Chicago Mayor Rahm Emanuel's administration as the Commissioner of the Chicago Department of Transportation. He was recruited as the first external hire (not from Chicago), and served on the transition team formulating the plan with a small group. He spearheaded big public realm projects like the Chicago Riverwalk and the 606 Trail, infrastructure projects like the renovation and expansion of three CTA stations, and mobility projects like Divvy Bikeshare.

Under his administration, Klein oversaw the following new and ongoing initiatives:

- BRT Chicago – Bus rapid transit
- Make Way for People
- Divvy – Chicago's Bike Share System
- Chicago Traffic Tracker
- Bloomingdale Trail
- CREATE Program
- Chicago Bicycle Ambassadors
- Safe Routes to School
- Wacker Drive Reconstruction
- Union Station Master Plan
- Wells Bridge Reconstruction
- All-Way Pedestrian Crossing
- Open311
- Addison Underbridge Connection of the North Riverfront Trail
- Chicago Riverwalk
- Navy Pier Flyover

Gabe Klein oversaw the publication of the following documents:

- Chicago Forward Action Agenda,
- Chicago Pedestrian Plan,
- Streets for Cycling 2020,
- Chicago Complete Streets Design Guidelines,
- Sustainable Urban Infrastructure Guidelines

=== Federal government work, Joint Office appointment ===
In November 2020, Klein was named a volunteer member of the Joe Biden presidential transition Agency Review Team, to support transition efforts related to the United States Department of Transportation.

In September 2022, Klein was tapped to lead the Joint Office of Energy and Transportation. In his role–the first-ever Executive Director–Klein leads a team tasked with rolling out a network of electric vehicle charging and sustainable fueling stations nationwide. His office has provided significant resources to states, cities, Metropolitan Planning Organizations, and companies that need technical assistance to roll out infrastructure.

Over the first two years, under Klein's leadership, the Joint Office has developed uniform minimum standards for charging with FHWA, which include consistent plug types and charging speeds, common payment systems, and accessible pricing information, locations, and availability. In addition, these standards establish strong workforce requirements and will create and support good-paying, highly skilled jobs in communities across the country. He established the ChargeX consortium, which funded the Argonne National Laboratory, the Idaho National Laboratory, and the National Renewable Energy Laboratory to address three EV charging challenges: payment processing and user interface, vehicle-charger communication, and diagnostic data sharing.

In collaboration with Tesla, SAE, and other industry players, the Joint Office facilitated moving the Tesla and North American Charging System into the public domain as an open standard (J3400) for use by any automaker. The Joint Office is also supporting a new $5.6 billion program to help transit agencies replace aging buses, reduce air pollution and improve the reliability of transit systems, as well as a $5 billion clean school bus program administered by the Environmental Protection Agency. Transit agencies can buy or lease U.S.-built zero-emission and low-emission transit buses and the necessary charging equipment and support facilities.

Klein and the Joint Office launched EVChart–a national data portal for charging data–and is working with federal highways on billions of dollars of funding for both grants for cities and states and formula funding. He also oversaw the roll-out of a National Zero Emission Freight Strategy, which focuses on advancing the deployment of zero-emission medium- and heavy-duty vehicle (ZE-MHDV) fueling infrastructure by targeting public investment to amplify private sector momentum, focus utility and regulatory energy planning, align industry activity, and mobilize communities for clean transportation.

=== Private ventures ===
Klein co-founded Cityfi in 2016, a consultancy that advises governments from Colorado to Chengdu on their transportation and innovation strategies as well as private companies ranging from Waymo to Verizon and now operates in Europe as well as North America. From 2014 to 2022, Klein was a Venture Partner at Fontinalis Partners in Detroit. He has advised and angel invested in several startups, including electric scooter company Spin (acquired by Ford), Actionfigure, Miles, and Ouster.

== Publications ==
Gabe Klein with David Vega Barachowitz Start-Up City: Inspiring Private and Public Entrepreneurship, Getting Projects Done, and Having Fun Island Press (2015) ISBN 9781610916905
