= Citi Bike Boyz =

Instagram account by Jerome Peel

Citi Bike Boyz is an Instagram account run by American skateboarder Jerome Peel. It is known for daredevil stunts performed on Citi Bikes, rented bicycles provided by the Citi Bike bikeshare program. The account posts tricks at skate parks and notable skate spots in New York City. The bikes are notoriously heavy, weighing around 45 pounds.

Peel is from West Palm Beach, Florida. He rode dirt bikes as a child. He never owned a bike in New York City, instead opting to commute via the CitiBike program. The Citi Bike Boyz account was published in 2017. The first post showed Peel jumping down the legendary double stairs at LES skatepark. The account went viral in December 2022 when Peel jumped across the subway tracks at 145th St, a trick inspired by Tyshawn Jones. As of recently Jerome has decided to no longer ride a city bike instead opting to ride a highly modified version.

Citi Bike Boyz supports the CitiBike program and advocates for the bike's use.
