= Netguru =

Software development company

Coordinates: 52°24′05.5″N 16°53′39.1″E

- Type: Joint-stock company
- Industry: Software development; Software consultancy; Software design; Web development; Management consulting; Market analysis; Internet of things
- Founded: May 8, 2008; 18 years ago
- Founder: Wiktor Schmidt; Jakub Filipowski; Adam Zygadlewicz
- Headquarters: ul. Małe Garbary 9, Poznań, Poland
- Number of locations: 5 offices (2022)
- Area served: Worldwide
- Key people: Jakub Filipowski (CEO); Wiktor Schmidt (Executive Chairman); Małgorzata Madalińska-Piętka (CFO)
- Services: Web applications; Mobile apps; Product design; Product development; IT consulting; SaaS marketplaces; Big data systems; Trading systems; Social networks; Robotics middleware
- Revenue: ▲€34,677,235 (2020)
- Net income: ▲€5.6M (2020)
- Number of employees: ▲900 (2022)
- Subsidiaries: Bitcraft; ITTX; Pilot44; Mohi.to; WeCanFly; Telos Projects
- Website: netguru.com

Netguru is a Polish software development and software consultancy company founded in 2008. Headquartered in Poznań, Poland, it is a globally operating business, with local offices including Warsaw, Kraków, Wrocław, Gdańsk and Białystok. It provides software design and product design, both for early-stage startups and corporations.

Since 2013, Netguru declares yearly growth of nearly 100 percent. It landed three times in Deloitte's Technology Fast 50 Central Europe ranking, and twice on the "FT 1000," the Financial Times' list of fastest-growing companies in Europe. In 2016, Netguru reached PLN 28.2M (US$7.8M) of income, and PLN 5.1M (US$1.4M) net profit, closed 2017 with turnover of PLN 40M (US$11.5M), and in 2018, doubled it at around PLN 80M (US$21.2M). In 2021, Netguru reached zł230 million (US$57.2) income.

== History ==
=== Founding years ===
Netguru was founded in Poznań, Poland by Wiktor Schmidt (an automation and robotics student at the Poznań University of Technology), Jakub Filipowski (a web designer and philosophy student at the Adam Mickiewicz University in Poznań), and Adam Zygadlewicz (an e-commerce entrepreneur), who met thanks to popularity of Filipowski's blog about the internet Yashke.com. The three opened the first coworking space in Poland in a rented office in central Poznań, where they developed websites together. Since 2007, through their own foundation Fundacja Polak 2.0, they also organized first BarCamp community meetings for innovation enthusiasts in Poland, along with further events: the International Startup Fair Democamp, the ShopCamp workshops, and the Hackfest.

On May 8, 2008, Schmidt, Filipowski and Zygadlewicz registered their software development business, as Netguru. Their first contracts were a Web 2.0 travel portal Kolumber.pl, for the media publishing corp Agora, and an employer relations portal for Bank Zachodni WBK. Netguru developed also their own microblogging social platform, a charity service, and a recruitment support tool HumanWay, awarded at startup competitions Seedcamp Warsaw and Aulery. Beside functional development and community management, the company was specializing in consulting and market analysis. Since September 2007, the Netguru has been documenting its portfolio and web development industry on an official blog.

In September 2010, Zygadlewicz announced a first coworking space for startups and freelance developers in Warsaw. In July 2011, Filipowski, along with entrepreneurs Borys Musielak and Anna Walkowska, moved their businesses together into a mansion in Żoliborz, establishing the Reaktor, which evolved into the first networking hub in Poland, and the venue for the Warsaw startup scene. Filipowski and Schmidt contributed the famed article on the internet website Antyweb, "There Will Be No More 'Polish Equivalents'", about web services Allegro, Gadu-Gadu, and Nasza Klasa, as local copycats of EBay, ICQ, and Classmates.com, respectively. The article’s punch line: "Let's get to work, get rid of complexes, and create models with a global or at least pan-European potential".

=== Focus on web development ===
From 2012, Netguru has been developing applications and platforms solely in Ruby on Rails. In 2013, HumanWay was acquired by the recruitment house Grupa Pracuj. Zygadlewicz exited Netguru, while Schmidt and Filipowski focused entirely on web applications for British, American, and German startups.

In 2014, Netguru became a partner for Spree Commerce. At the time, its portfolio included a market research provider GlobalWebIndex, and a language-learning platform Babbel. In 2015, Netguru implemented a mobile app for a media marketplace Transterra Media, which allows news outlets to manage and publish pre-produced videos. Netguru formed a team of product designers working with IKEA and Volkswagen. The team also created a personal assistant system for a domestic robot.

=== International expansion ===
In 2014, Netguru moved onto Israeli and the Middle East markets, to support entrepreneurs from across the UAE & the MENA regions. In 2015, the company joined the London fintech community. In 2016, it created a mobile bicycle-sharing platform for Citi Bike. And in 2017, it developed Helpr which connects British social care workers with care recipients.

In 2016, Netguru recorded an increase in revenues and growth, with no investment support – over PLN 30M (60% year-over-year growth); in 2017, about PLN 40M (US$11.5M), and in 2018, around PLN 80M (US$21.2M). In 2013, the company had about 50 employees; in 2016, over 300, and in 2018, 500 employees around Poland. Between 2016–2018, Netguru reached an EBITDA margin of 15%. In 2022 900 employees were reached, but in the beginning of 2023 150 of them were laid off.

Since 2017, Netguru has been developing its business consulting expertise, prototyping products, and building marketing strategies. It has helped large organisations to adopt business agility practices, and innovations with software robots.

On June 3, 2019, Netguru's chief operating officer Marek Talarczyk was named the new CEO, with Schmidt including the position of executive chairman, and Małgorzata Madalińska-Piętka joining the board as chief financial officer. In May 2023, Talarczyk stepped down, with Filipowski taking over as CEO.

== Main activities ==
Netguru specializes in developing front-end and back-end web applications, mobile applications, product design, and consulting. According to its tagline, the company "builds digital products that let people do things differently". Its portfolio includes SaaS marketplaces, e-commerce, big data systems, trading systems, and social networks.

=== Machine Learning ===
In May 2018, during a Microsoft hackathon in Prague, Netguru (along with MicroscopeIT) launched a deep-learning image-recognition application that solved segmentation with neural networks. Netguru also partnered with the domestic robotic manufacturer Temi, on building the robotics middleware for the consumer assistant robot, using natural language processing.

=== Other initiatives ===
In 2010, Netguru developers created an online platform for the foundation Apps for Good, that allows cooperation of teachers, students and experts in schools in the United States, Spain, Portugal, and Poland.

Since 2017, Netguru has conducted workshops based on design-thinking sprints developed by Google, which are aimed to answer critical business questions through design, prototyping, and testing ideas with customers, to reduce the risk of bringing a new product, service, or feature to the market.

== Mergers and acquisitions ==
In December 2017, in its first transaction, Netguru took over a team of developers and designers from the Internet-of-things company Vorm. In May 2018, Netguru merged with the IT support and DevOps provider ITTX, and in July 2018, it acquired the software house Bitcraft.

In March 2022, Netguru acquired a minority stake in Pilot44, a San Francisco-based innovation studio. In July 2022, Netguru acquired majority stake in an e-commerce UX agency Mohi.to, as well as an ecommerce agency WeCanFly, both based in Wrocław.

== Original publications ==
In 2016, Netguru compiled Project Management Tactics for Pros, an e-book with guidance on IT projects, including preparation and budget. In 2018, Netguru published Design Process for Pros, a live e-book actively curated by the designers community, with a set of best practices in web design. Another guide, From Concept to Completion (2018), is an Agile software consulting walk-through, for understanding software development processes and tried-and-true techniques.

Netguru collaborated with a survey-building service Typeform on State of Stack (2016), a report of the latest trends in web development, based on a developer community study. In 2016, Netguru published the London Startup Guide, a guide on tech business events, meetups, business incubators and communities of London.

== Educational events ==
Between 2017–2018, Netguru organized summer workshops Netguru Code College for coding enthusiasts walking through web application building processes with Ruby on Rails professionals In 2018, Netguru hosted the Disruption Forum in Berlin, a meeting of the fintech community which turned into a regular fintech startup event.

Between 2013–2015, Netguru have coached Ruby on Rails around Poland, at free practical workshops aimed at PHP, Java, and .NET developers. Since 2015, Netguru have hosted weekend hackathons in its Poznan headquarters, and regular Ruby on Rails student workshops at the Katowice Institute of Information Technologies.

Since 2015, Netguru managers have organized regular free project management workshops. Since 2017, Netguru has hosted regular designers events Dribbble Meetup, along with Swift Poznan and PTAQ meetings. Netguru has also cooperated with universities, involved in academic life, and during monthly webinars for technology enthusiasts.

== Trademark registration dispute ==
In 2014, the company filed an application to the European Union Intellectual Property Office to register EU trade mark "Netguru" in several classes related to computer services. However, it was rejected due to the lack of distinctiveness of the name. The company appealed to the General Court of the European Union, which dismissed the complaint, considering that the combination of the words "net" and "guru" appeared as advertising, nor it doesn't allow the target public to perceive the sign as an indication of the commercial origin of the goods and services in question.

== Awards and accolades ==
Netguru is a three-time winner of the Fast 50 Central Europe competition where the accounting network Deloitte recognizes and profiles the 50 most dynamic technology companies in the region, based on the revenue growth over past five years. Netguru was ranked 5 in 2014, and 2015, and received the third award in 2017.

Netguru landed twice on the "FT 1000", the list of Europe's fastest-growing companies in Europe according to Financial Times, in 2017 (ranked 188), and in 2018 (ranked 466). In 2016, the company was introduced by Forbes into the list of "Diamonds", the list of the most promising companies in Poland.

In 2014, Netguru was named Top Ruby on Rails Developers, by the American market analysis firm Clutch, in the report on Market Leaders, based on in-depth interviews with clients. Then again in August 2017, Clutch named Netguru as one of the best outsourcing companies in the industry. In 2018, Schmidt and Filipowski were among Polish finalists of the Ernst & Young Entrepreneur of the Year Award competition.

In 2011, Netguru won the Aulery award, as one of the best tech companies with global potential. While Schmidt and Filipowski have been both placed twice on Brief magazine's list of The Most Creative in Business: in 2014, ranked 38, and in 2016, ranked 13.

In November 2017, Netguru, joined by the software house CashCape, received two awards in the Bankathon Berlin, for an application explaining the impact of the Payments Services Directive and other regulations.
