= Citi Bike =

Bike sharing system in the New York City area

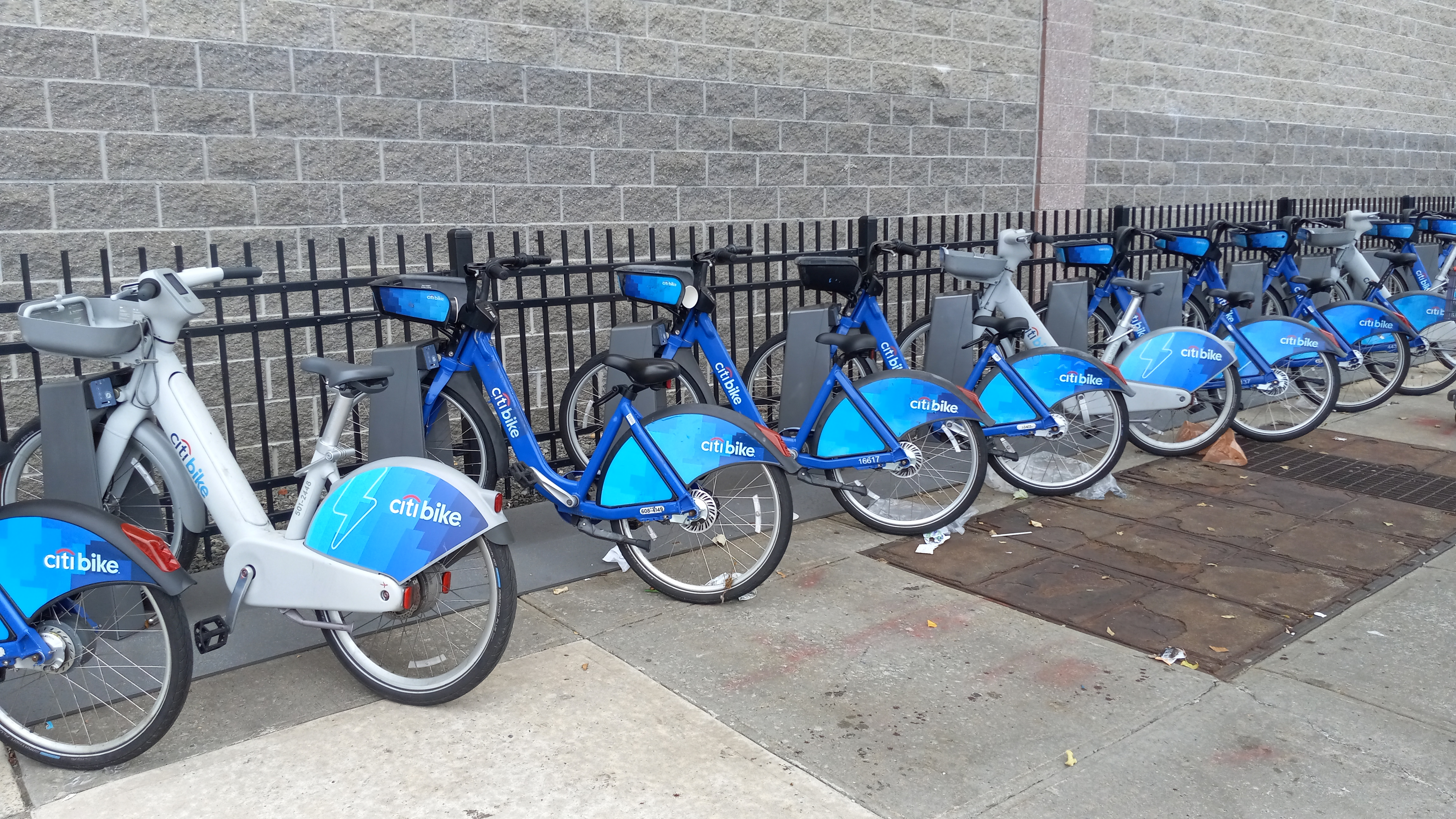
- Citi Bikes in Sunset Park, Brooklyn. The gray bicycles are e-bikes.

Overview
- Owner: Lyft
- Locale: New York City (Manhattan, the western Bronx, northern Brooklyn, and western Queens); Jersey City, New Jersey; Hoboken, New Jersey
- Transit type: Bicycle-sharing system
- Number of stations: 2,500 (November 2026)
- Daily ridership: 104,557 (daily average, March 2025)
- Website: citibikenyc.com

Operation
- Began operation: May 27, 2013; 13 years ago
- Operator: Motivate
- Number of vehicles: 33,000 (September 2023)

Citi Bike is a privately owned public bicycle sharing system serving New York City as well as Jersey City and Hoboken, New Jersey. It is named after lead sponsor Citigroup and is operated by Lyft.

First proposed in 2008 by the New York City Department of Transportation, Citi Bike's scheduled 2011 opening was delayed by Hurricane Sandy and technological problems. It opened in May 2013 with 332 stations and 6,000 bikes. By October 2017 annual expansions brought the totals to 706 stations and 12,000 bikes, making the service the largest bike sharing program in the United States.

In October 2017 the system reached a total of 50 million rides and in July 2020 the system reached 100 million rides. As of 2023, there are 180,000 annual subscribers. Monthly average daily ridership numbers increased above 100,000 for the first time in June 2021. The all-time record for ridership in a single month occurred in October 2024, when the system had 5.13 million rides.

== History ==
In an effort to reduce emissions, road wear, collisions, and road and transit congestion and to improve public health, the New York City Department of Transportation (NYCDOT) researched alternative forms of transportation in the 2000s, publishing a strategic plan in 2008. According to NYCDOT statistics, 56% of all automobile trips within the city were under 3 miles (4.8 km) (with 22% under 1 mile (1.6 km) and 10% under 0.5 miles (0.80 km)), well within distances readily served by bicycle. To encourage residents to use bicycles more, the city committed to expanding bike lane miles, bike racks, and bike-parking shelters. In the 2009 bicycle share feasibility report, the New York City Department of City Planning (DCP) recommended building out the system in three phases in the four most populous boroughs, but no timeline was made public.

=== Alta Bicycle Share operation ===
==== Development and delays ====
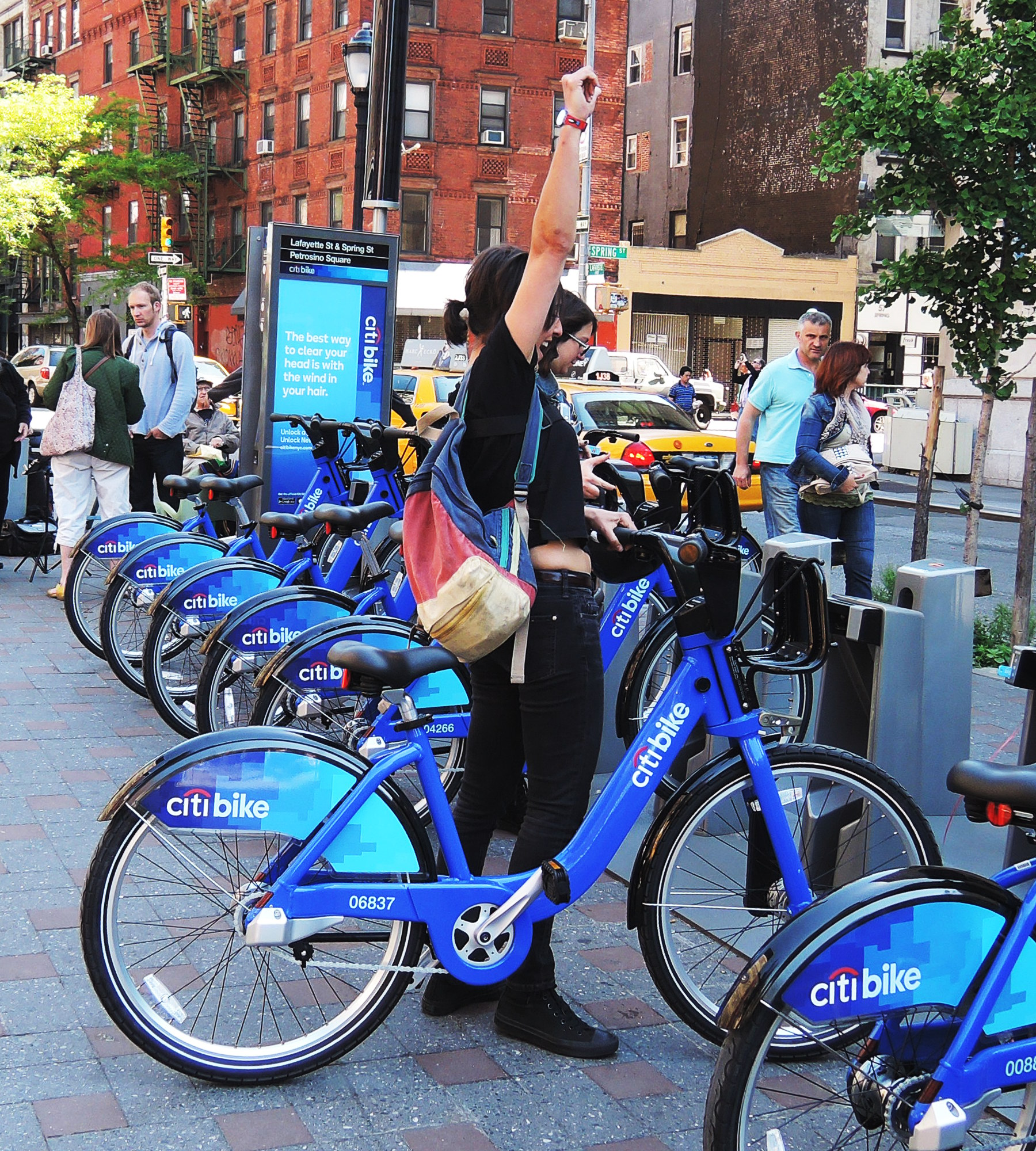
Customers at Lafayette Street at Citi Bike's opening in May 2013

The city, which had already been encouraging cycling as transportation, decided to establish a bicycle share program of the kind that had seen success in other cities. In 2011, it selected Alta Bicycle Share to operate the bike share in New York City. Citi Bike was created as a public–private partnership operated by NYC Bike Share LLC, a wholly owned subsidiary of Alta. The system, which was first supposed to start in fall 2011, was pushed back to summer 2012 due to uncertainties about where to place the rental stations. The city had originally intended to place Citi Bike stalls mostly on sidewalks and public plazas, but there were some locations where stalls would take up parking spaces. Only one phase of the program was to be implemented in 2012, with more phases to come later.

Software problems delayed the planned start until March 2013. These problems were also reported by Alta programs in Chicago and in Chattanooga, Tennessee. The problems reportedly occurred because the Public Bike System Company, a Canadian affiliate of Alta, was involved in a dispute with software supplier 8D Technologies. Then, Hurricane Sandy damaged 1,000 bicycles and 60 stations in storage at Brooklyn Navy Yard. As planning progressed, some residents expressed dismay at the lack of docking stations in their neighborhoods while others fought against stations on their blocks.

==== Deployment ====
Citi Bike began operations on May 27, 2013, with 332 stations. The stations were located in Manhattan south of 59th Street and in Brooklyn north of Atlantic Avenue and west of Nostrand Avenue. Officials said the system opened with 6,000 bikes. At the time of implementation, it was the largest bikesharing program in the United States. When launched, the system was slated to expand to 10,000 bicycles and 600 stations in Manhattan south of 79th Street, plus stations in several Brooklyn neighborhoods, including Greenpoint, Crown Heights, Bedford-Stuyvesant, Park Slope and Carroll Gardens as well as parts of Queens. At first, the timeline for the expansion was not made publicly available, but it was later announced that the expansion would be complete by the end of 2016. There has been increasing interest in further expansion across New York City; for example, in June 2013 a Brooklyn politician opened a petition drive to accelerate deployment in Greenpoint. In contrast, the May 2013 installation deliberately bypassed South Williamsburg.

Throughout the first year, there were more than 100,000 registered members who rode over 14,700,000 miles (23,700,000 km), including 70,000 members in the first three months alone. On August 6, 2013, riders took 42,010 trips, the largest single-day total for any North American bike-sharing system. In Citi Bike's first few months, some kiosks docked too many bikes while others did not have enough, so the company started using a fleet of box trucks to carry bikes between different kiosks every day. The kiosks also had some software problems in their early months. Problems included stations that did not accept payment information; kiosks where passersby could take bikes without paying because the bikes were not locked securely; and bike docks that did not work at all, forcing riders to travel to other stations.

The deployment of a clean energy public transit system such as Citi Bike coincides with the sixth IPCC report on mitigation's call for an increase of modes of public transportation such as biking and walking. According to the report, "Case studies suggest that active mobility could reduce emissions from urban transport by 2%- 10% depending on the setting".

==== Popularity ====
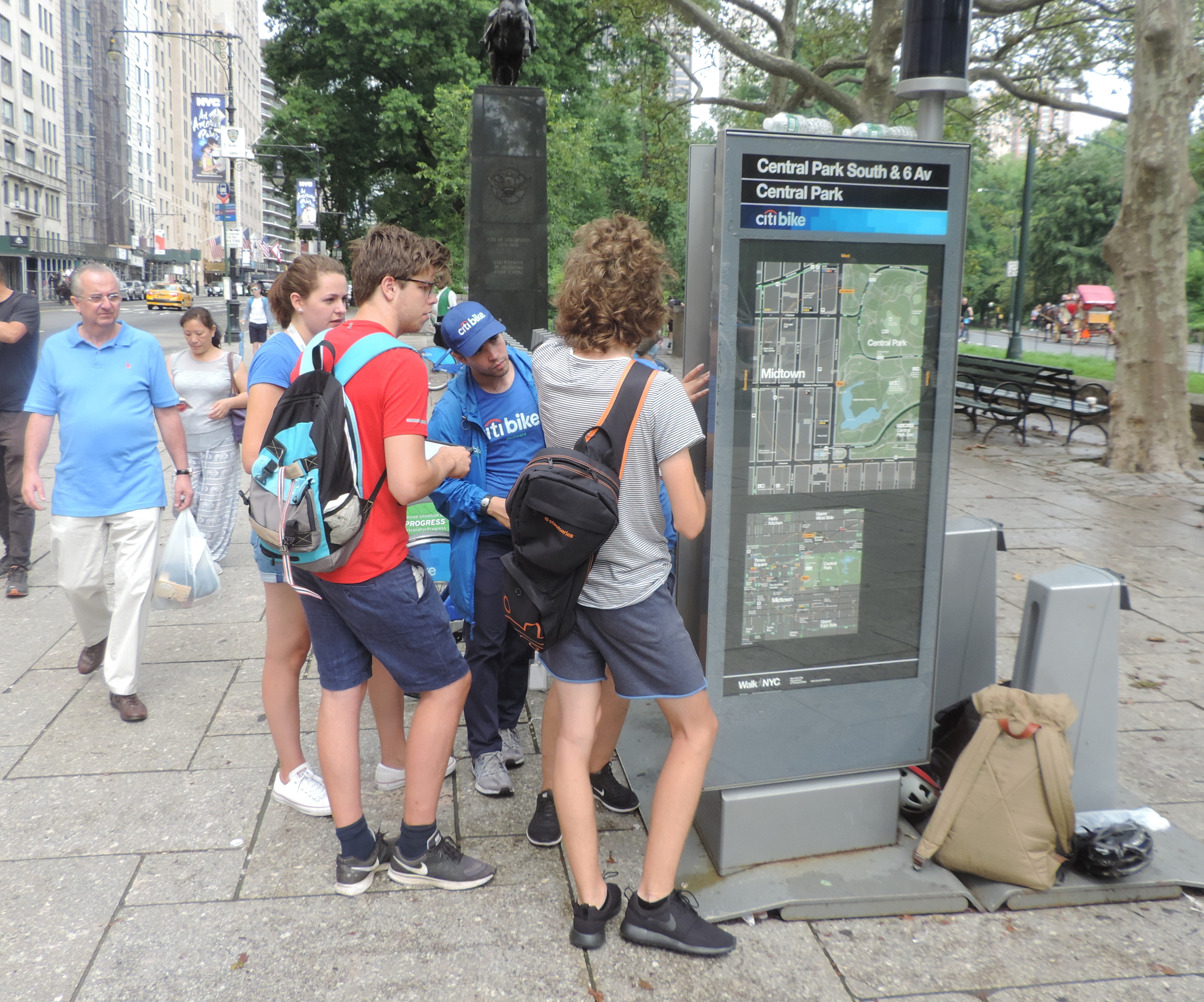
People being instructed in using the system

Citi Bike's massive, unexpected popularity caused problems within a year. In January 2014, the designer of Citi Bike's bicycles and docking stations filed for bankruptcy protection. Officials with Montreal, Quebec-based Public Bike System Company (also known as Bixi) said they were $46 million in debt, partly because the operators of Citi Bike and Chicago's Divvy bikeshare had withheld a combined $5 million in payments because of software glitches in the docking stations. Alta officials, who operate Citi Bike, Divvy, and Capital Bikeshare in Washington, D.C., said they anticipated no interruptions of service, though they did want $20 million to expand the system to 10,000 bikes and 600 stations.

Due to Citi Bike's various problems, expansions to the Upper East and Upper West Sides were delayed for at least a year. Its general manager resigned in March 2014. The new mayor, Bill de Blasio, stated that he wanted to expand Citi Bike's reach, but that he could not make city funds available for such an expansion at that time. By May, the city government wanted Motivate to pay $1 million to compensate for the parking spaces that had been removed for the docking stations.

Citi Bike workers joined Transport Workers Union of America Local 100 in July 2015. The company had about 200 employees joining the union at the time. That September, in the face of overwhelming support for unionization, Citi Bike agreed to recognize TWU Local 100's representation of Citi Bike's labor force.

=== Motivate operation ===
==== Reorganization ====
On October 28, 2014, Alta Bicycle Share and NYCDOT announced a plan to improve and expand the Citi Bike program. Bikeshare Holdings LLC, a new entity formed by the partners at real estate developer Related Companies and gym chain Equinox Fitness, acquired Alta Bicycle Share—renamed Motivate—and named Jay Walder as the new chief executive. The increase of funding included $5 million from Bikeshare Holdings; $70.5 million from a 10-year extension of the Citigroup sponsorship; and $15 million from the Goldman Sachs Urban Investment Group. As part of the restructuring deal, Walder moved the company headquarters from Portland, Oregon, to New York City. The Citi Bike system would continue to be operated by NYC Bicycle Share, a subsidiary of Alta Bicycle Share. By 2017, Citi Bike was to expand its operations by 6,000 bikes and add 375 new docking stations. Motivate was to pay the city $5 million per year in parking fees. This agreement also called for improvements to the system's operations, including upgrades to its software and technology. The company was also appointing a vice president for technology.

Following two years of software errors in the bike share system, Motivate shut down the Citi Bike system over the last weekend of March 2015 to replace the existing system software with that of 8D Technologies. The new mobile platform was developed by the Polish software house Netguru. Since then, the Citi Bike system has continued to expand its installations using the 8D Technologies as its software and station equipment supplier. Through that summer, Motivate also refurbished all of the system's 6,000 bikes, as well as fixed the bicycle stations' kiosks and improved the bike docks at these stations.

==== Expansion to Jersey City and Queens ====
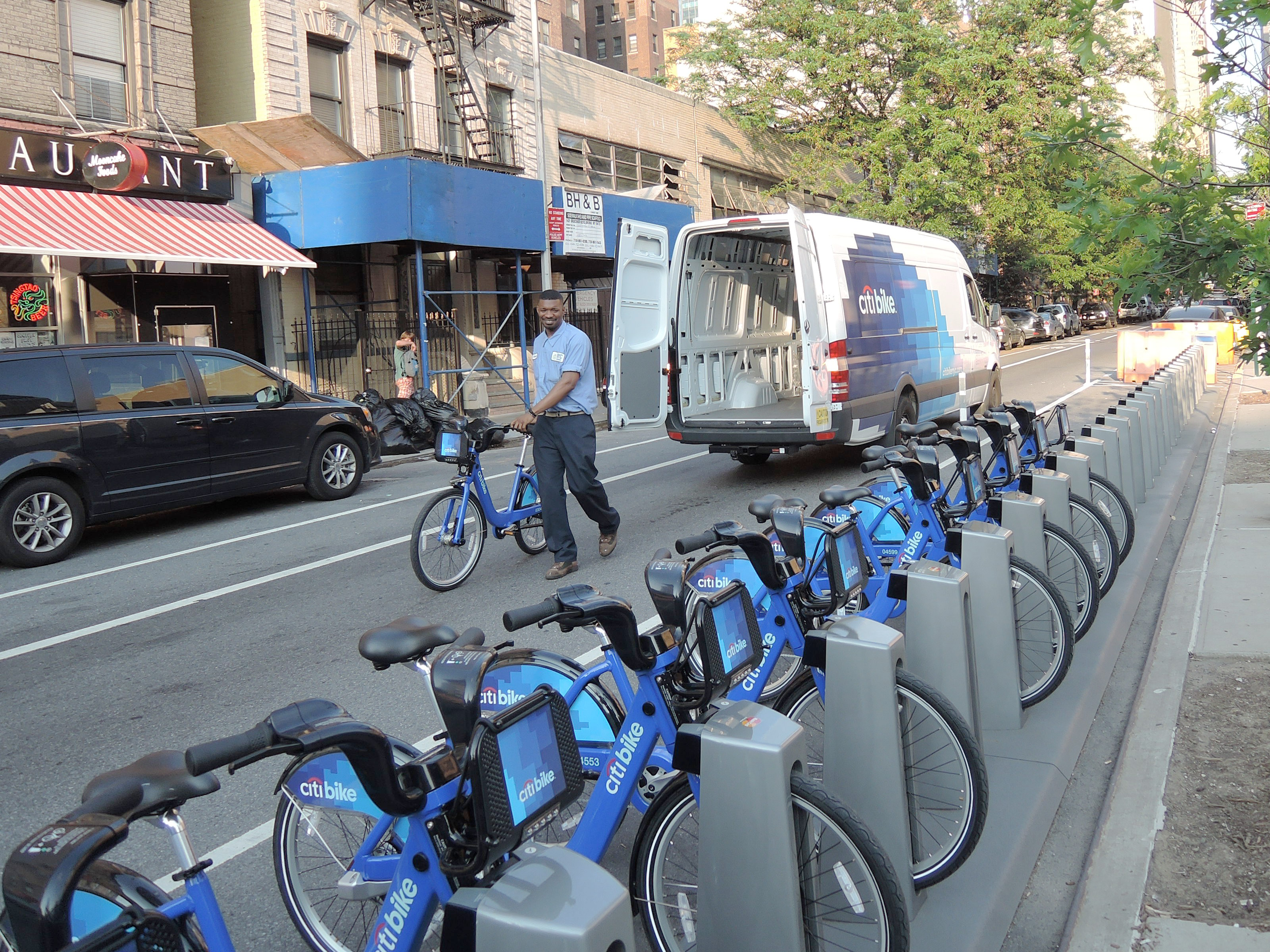
Bike delivery to station by van

In early 2015, as part of its expansion, NYCDOT and Motivate increased the price of annual memberships from $95 to $149 plus taxes, although annual rates for New York City Housing Authority residents and members of some Community Development Credit Unions will remain at $60 per year. That year, the company installed 91 new stations in Queens and Brooklyn, with 12 of these stations in Long Island City and the other 79 in Greenpoint, Williamsburg, and Bedford-Stuyvesant. Citi Bike also added 48 new stations on the Upper East and Upper West Sides, up to 86th Street. The system expanded across the Hudson River to Jersey City, New Jersey, on September 21, 2015, with 35 stations and 350 bikes. However, some Jersey City residents objected to the implementation of Citi Bike there, complaining of lost parking spots for cars. In July 2016, the Jersey City Citi Bike system was expanded for the first time, with another 15 stations and an additional 150 bikes.

In August 2016, the company started installing 139 new stations in Manhattan up to 110th Street and in Brooklyn between Red Hook and Prospect Park. The stations in the new installation were closer together than in previous phases because the previous phases had not fulfilled National Association of City Transportation Officials' recommended bike share-station density of 28 per square mile (11/km^{2}). Some residents of Park Slope were outspoken in opposition to the loss of car parking. One month later, on September 13, 2016, the system saw 64,672 trips, the highest recorded in one day at the time.

After the December 2016 announcement of a further expansion to Harlem and Astoria, some city politicians proposed expanding the system further to the Bronx and Staten Island. By the end of 2017, Citi Bike planned to double its bike fleet to 12,000, with the possibility that some of the expansion could be publicly funded. On May 18, 2017, Motivate presented a proposal to expand the system in all five boroughs, including adding new stations to the Bronx and Staten Island, without any public funding. To make up for the lost tax funding, Motivate asked the city to waive fees charged for placing stalls inside former parking spots, as well as redesigning the payment hierarchy and possibly adding more ad space on pay stations.

In 2017, officials proposed dockless bike sharing for the Citi Bike network, which would allow bikes to be rented without being tethered to docks. This was proposed after several bike sharing companies announced their intent to operate in New York City. That August, the dockless bike-sharing company Spin had started a dockless operation in the Rockaways but was told to cease and desist because the NYCDOT had licensed Citi Bike as the only official bike-share operator in New York City. By the end of August, Citi Bike started designing a dockless prototype that could lock its own wheels based on whether the customer had paid. The 140 new stalls and 2,000 new bikes in Harlem, Crown Heights, Prospect Heights, Long Island City, and Astoria were installed in September 2017. The system saw its 50 millionth rider in early October 2017, as the new stalls were being activated. The new docking stations in Brooklyn led to an imbalance in the number of bikes in certain neighborhoods, since there were more bikes being docked in lower-elevation areas such as Downtown Brooklyn, while fewer riders docked bikes in high-elevation neighborhoods such as Prospect Heights and Crown Heights.

=== Lyft operation ===
==== Takeover and expansion plans ====
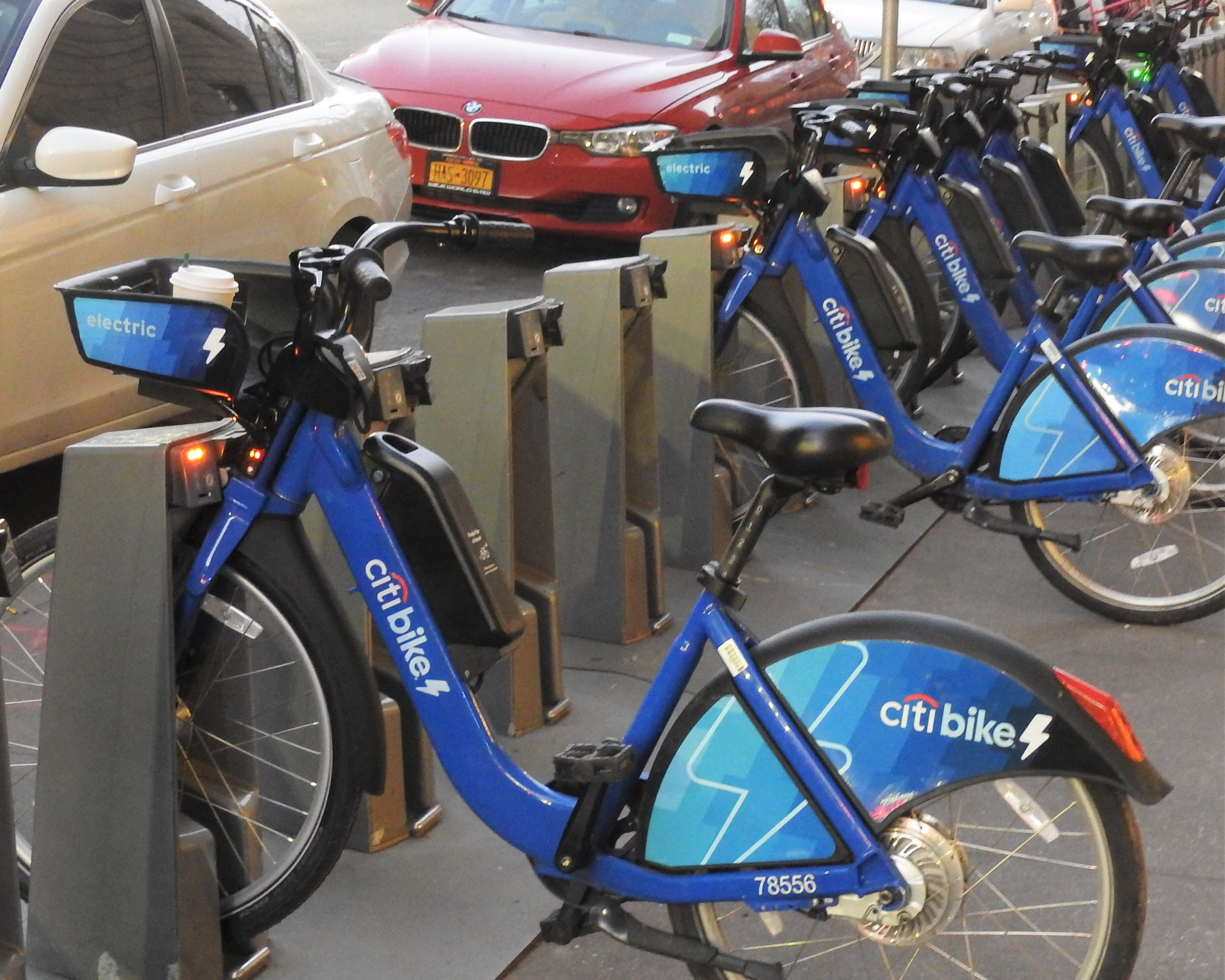
Original Pedal Assist E-bikes. Red light indicates not for use.

Lyft took over Citi Bike when it acquired Motivate in July 2018. The next month, Citi Bike started testing 200 pedal-assisted electric bicycles, which soon became popular among customers. Additional e-bikes were planned to be added in advance of the 14th Street Tunnel shutdown, which was originally supposed to close a major subway tunnel entirely.

Lyft announced a further expansion of Citi Bike service in November 2018. The US$100 million, five-year expansion would double the bike-share system's service area to 35 square miles (91 km^{2}). In addition, the number of bicycles would more than triple, from 12,000 to 40,000. This would make Citi Bike among the largest bike-share systems in the world. The Gothamist website, citing a Lyft employee, stated that electric bikes would make up the "vast majority" of the new bikes. In February 2019, it was announced that the Citi Bike system would have 4,000 electric bikes by that June, up from 200. Because of the popularity of the electric bikes, a $2 fee would be added to each electric bike trip starting April 27. Later that year, all electric bikes were removed from service for a period due to accidents while braking.

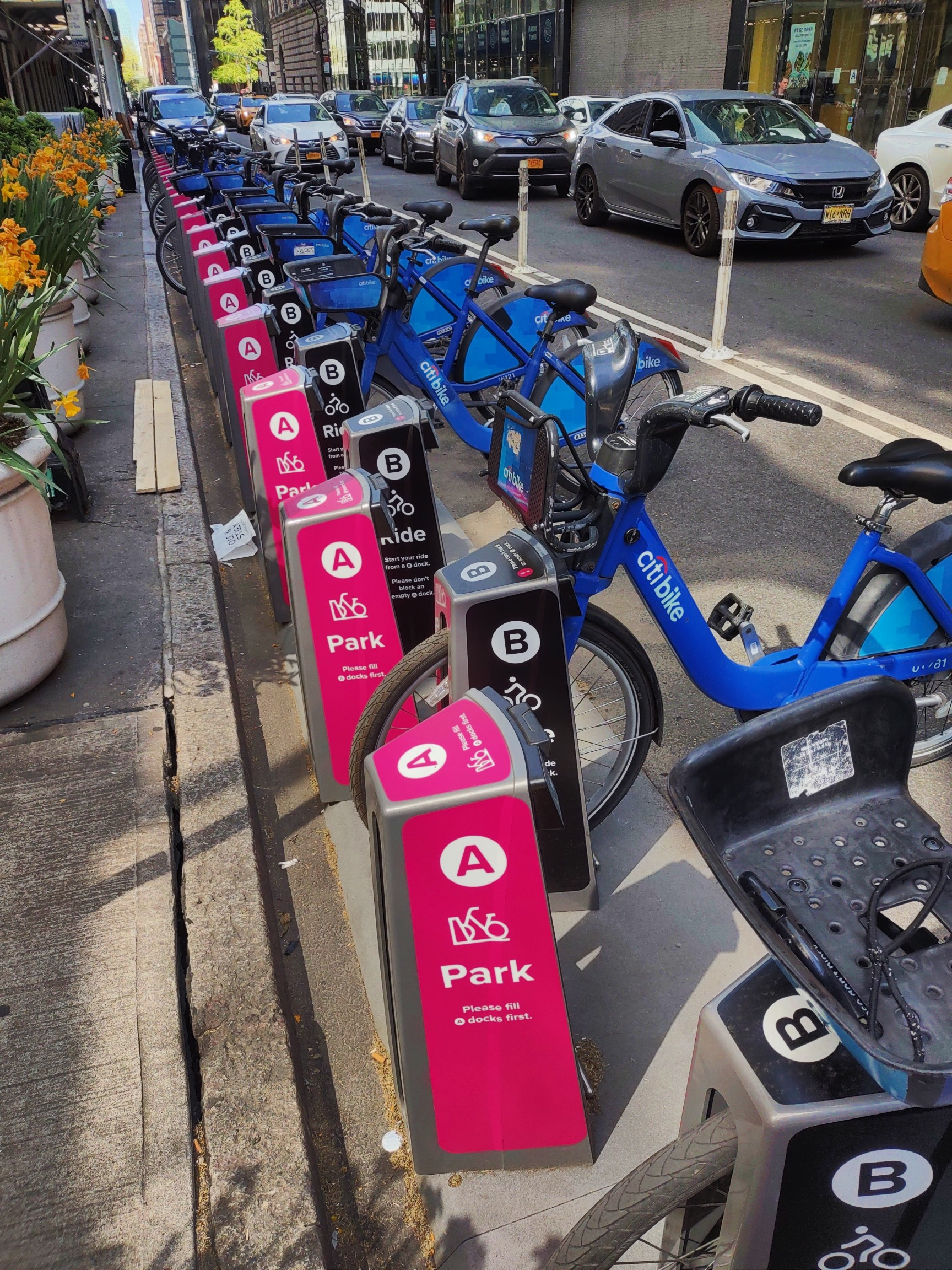
High density docks, 2022

In July 2019, Citi Bike announced a timeline for its phase 3 expansion, which would double its service area. At the time, new bike-share stalls were being installed in East Williamsburg, Brooklyn; Bushwick, Brooklyn; and Ridgewood, Queens, along the route of the BMT Canarsie Line, which serves the L train. By 2020, stalls would be installed in the remainder of Upper Manhattan (namely Hamilton Heights, Washington Heights, and Inwood) and in the South Bronx. Before 2023, new stalls would also be installed in southwest, southeast, and eastern Brooklyn, including Brownsville, East Flatbush, Kensington, Prospect Lefferts Gardens, Sunset Park, and the remaining portions of Bedford–Stuyvesant and Crown Heights. Stalls would also be installed in northwestern Queens, namely Sunnyside, Maspeth, Elmhurst, Jackson Heights, and Corona. That September 5, Citi Bike reached 91,529 trips, the highest-ever single-day ridership.

==== 2020s ====
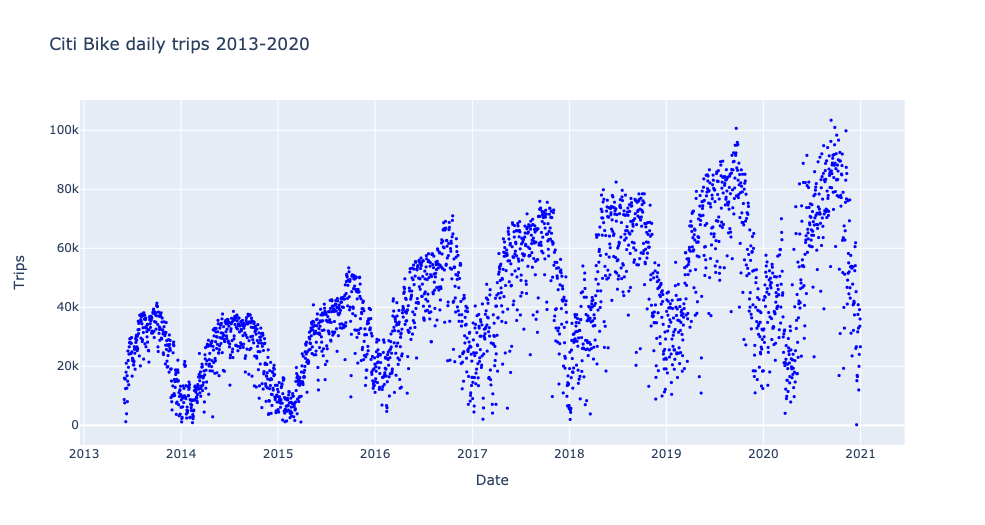
Number of daily Citi Bike rides from 2013 to 2020

E-bikes returned to the Citi Bike fleet in February 2020. That May, the system expanded into the Bronx and further north into Manhattan. During the COVID-19 pandemic in the United States, Citi Bike recorded its 100 millionth all-time ride, as the pandemic resulted in an increase in bicycle usage. In August 2020, the governments of Jersey City and Hoboken, New Jersey, finalized an agreement with Lyft to operate Citi Bike stations in both cities for at least five years. The changes included upgrades to 51 existing Citi Bike stations in Jersey City and the addition of 46 additional stations in both cities during 2020 and 2021. In total, there would be nearly 1,000 Citi Bikes and 95 stations in New Jersey as part of the agreement. Hoboken had previously been served by a bike share system named JerseyBike, which was incompatible with Citi Bike, The Jersey City Municipal Council and the Hoboken City Council both approved their respective portions of the expansion in early 2021. Citi Bike launched in Hoboken in May 2021; within a year, there were just over 850,000 Citi Bike trips in Hoboken. Monthly average ridership numbers were above 100,000 for the first time in June 2021, and on September 11, 2021, Citi Bike set a single day ridership record of 135,005 rides.

Citi Bike prices increased in 2022, 2023, and 2024. Further expansions planned from 2021 to 2024 would bring half the city’s residents within a five-minute walk of a Citi Bike stall, although no stations would be installed in Staten Island. An expansion to Maspeth and Ridgewood in Queens was announced in early 2022, followed by an expansion to Ditmas Park, Brooklyn, at the end of that year. Many residents of Maspeth and Ridgewood opposed the proposed expansion of Citi Bike into their neighborhoods, resulting in delays in the installation of Citi Bike stations in these neighborhoods. Lyft also announced in 2022 that it would roll out a second e-bike model with a longer range; there would be 4,000 such e-bikes throughout the city. Citigroup renewed its sponsorship of Citi Bike in May 2023 for ten years. Lyft was considering selling the service by the middle of that year, at which point there were over 1,900 stations across four boroughs, Jersey City, and Hoboken. Citi Bike officials announced in mid-2023 that the service would be extended by the end of that year to Jackson Heights, Queens, and to the northwestern Bronx. That November, Lyft announced plans to double the number of electric bikes in the Citi Bike fleet.

Lyft announced in July 2024 that it would increase fares for e-bikes. That September, city councilman Lincoln Restler introduced a bill that would set a maximum fee for certain Citi Bike rides. Citi Bike announced a further expansion that December as part of phase 3.5, as well as additional stalls in neighborhoods with existing Citi Bike stalls. This expansion would bring Citi Bike stalls to Bay Ridge, Brownsville, East New York, and Kensington in Brooklyn; areas west of Flushing Meadows–Corona Park in Queens; and Norwood and Riverdale in the north Bronx. The first two e-bike charging stations in the Citi Bike network were installed in 2024, and additional charging stations were announced in mid-2025. Additional docks in Hoboken were also installed in 2025. That June, Mayor Eric Adams ordered that Citi Bike limit the speeds of its electric bikes to 15 miles per hour (24 km/h), prompting the company to rapidly install speedometers on its e-bikes. This increased transportation costs for e-bike riders, who paid for each minute they rode. The Adams administration and Lyft officials announced plans that August to implement age verification, preventing riders under 16 years old from renting bikes. NYCDOT announced in October 2025 that Citi Bike would expand into Forest Hills, Queens, the next year. In 2026, Citi Bike completed its phase 3.5 expansion into the Bronx and Brooklyn, bringing the system's service area to 86.5 square miles (224 km^{2}), serving 62.5% of city residents.

== Company ==
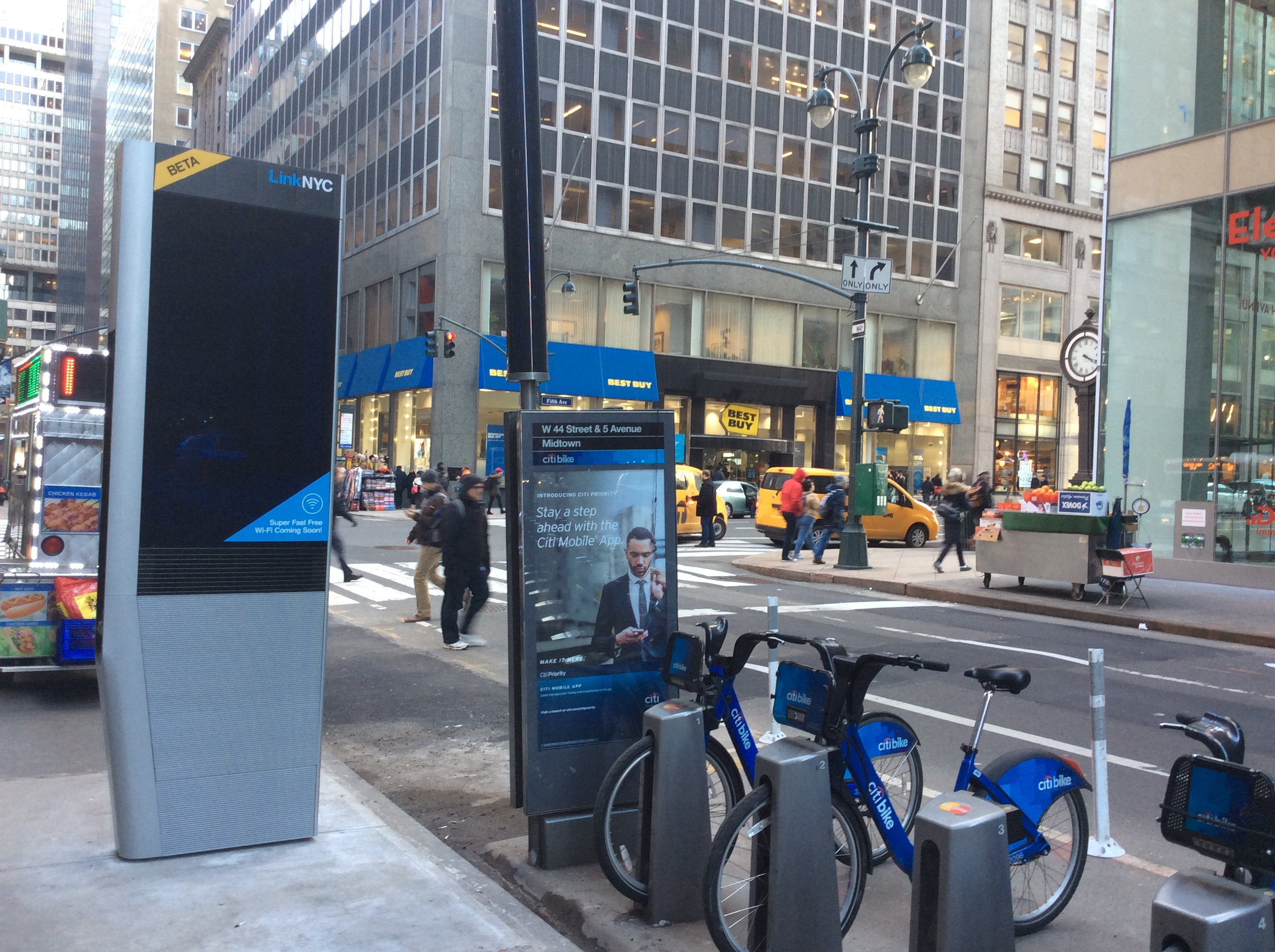
Citi Bike pay station in Midtown Manhattan; at left is a LinkNYC booth.

Citi Bike is not funded by any public funds or taxpayer dollars. Citigroup spent US$41 million to be its lead sponsor for six years, and in return was allowed to put its name on the bikes; in 2014, Citigroup injected an additional US$70.5 million and extended its sponsorship through 2024. However, the bikeshare is owned by NYC Bike Share LLC, a subsidiary of Alta Bicycle Share, Inc. Jay Walder was the CEO of Bikeshare Holdings, which includes Alta Bicycle Share, and in turn, NYC Bike Share LLC and Citi Bike, until 2018 when the company was acquired by Lyft. In February 2017, Motivate and 8D Technologies merged, with Citi Bike ultimately being operated under the purview of the combined companies. Citi Bike became the largest bike-sharing system in the United States when it opened in 2013. Citi Bike had 130,000 members by July 2017, a number that grew to 180,000 by May 2023.

On average, Citi Bike trips wholly within Midtown Manhattan are at least 2 miles per hour (3.2 km/h) faster, 2–3 minutes shorter, and $6 cheaper than a taxi between the same two points, with most taxi trips in that area being less than 1 mile (1.6 km) long. For trips between 1 and 1.5 miles (1.6 and 2.4 km) long, average Citi Bike trips are at least 5 minutes faster and $11.75 cheaper as opposed to the comparable taxi trip. A software developer at Genius extrapolated that from July 2016 to June 2017, forty percent of all taxi trips taken within neighborhoods served by Citi Bike were slower than the same trip via bike. Over half of all Citi Bike trips occurred during rush hours in 2016, but there were at least 10 times as many taxi trips as Citi Bike trips in Midtown during rush hour in 2015. The NYCDOT publishes a list of Citi Bike usage statistics on its website.

In Citi Bike's first three years of operation, no one died while riding a Citi Bike. This was partly attributed to the bikes' design, as well as the higher concentration of cyclists on New York City roads before and since Citi Bike's launch. The first death involving a Citi Bike occurred in June 2017, when a cyclist in Chelsea was struck by a bus.

Lyft's financial data, as provided to NYCDOT, indicates that Citi Bike ran a deficit in 2021 and 2022 (the 2022 deficit being almost $11 million), then profits in 2023 ($1.8 million), 2024 (about $6.8 million), and 2025 ($24.6 million).

== Bikes ==
=== Design ===
As of 2023, there are about 33,000 bicycles in the Citi Bike fleet, a number that had increased to 35,000 by 2025.

==== Standard bicycles ====
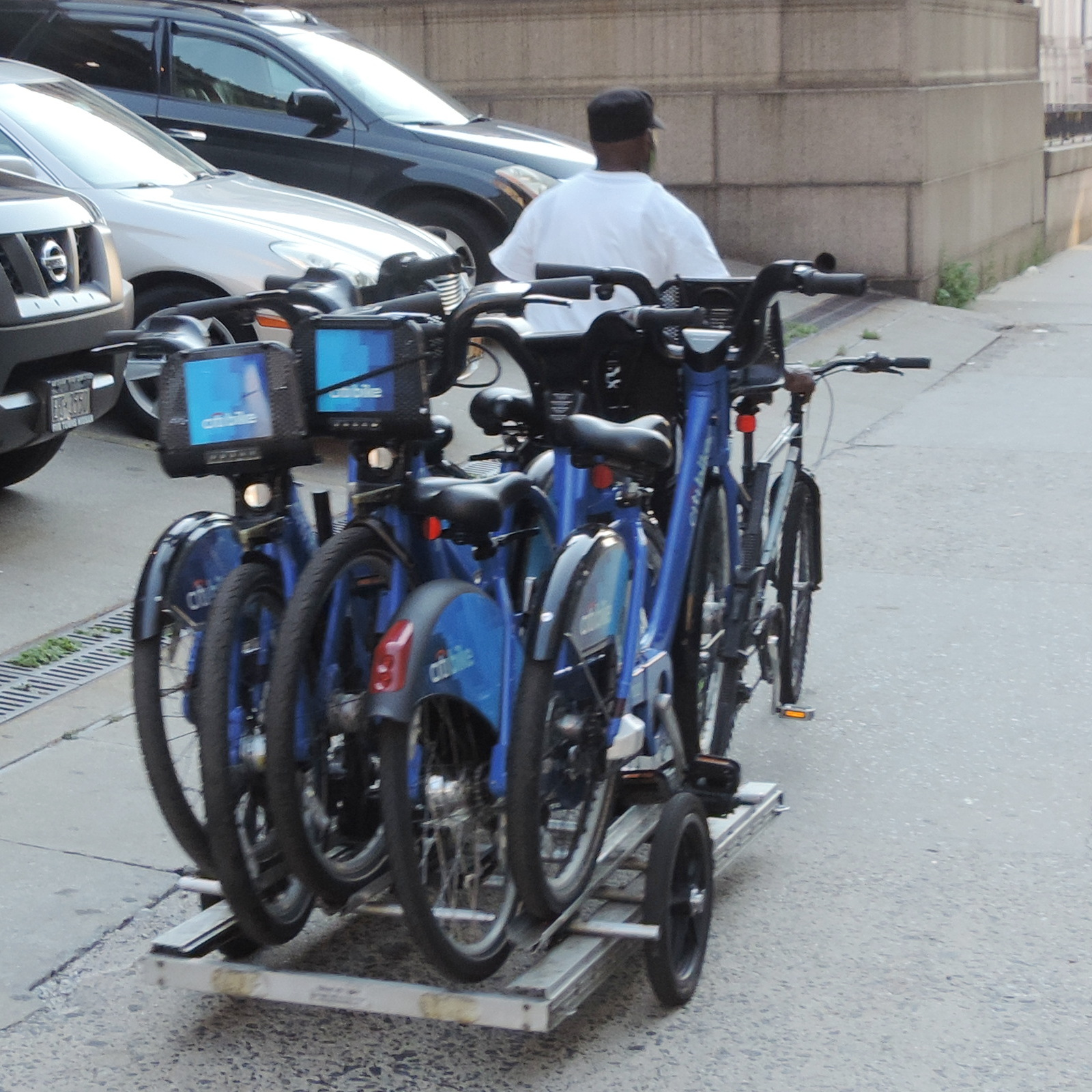
Transporting bikes on a bicycle trailer

The Citi Bike fleet has 20,000 utility bicycles as of 2025. They have a unisex step-through frame with an upright seating position, weighing about 45 pounds (20 kg) each. Their one-piece aluminum frame and handlebars conceal cables and fasteners in an effort to protect them from vandalism and bad weather; the handlebars are located above the seat, allowing riders to sit upright and thereby maintain balance. They are equipped with Shimano Nexus three-speed, grip-shifter-operated internally-geared hubs, full mudguards/fenders and chain guard. The heavy-duty tires are puncture-resistant and filled with nitrogen to maintain proper inflation pressure longer. The tires are also wider, leading to increased stability. Twin LED rear lights of a pre-2015 design are integrated into the frame; the frame's bright-blue color increases the bikes' visibility.

The bikes are built in Saguenay, Quebec, by Cycles Devinci and are assembled in Detroit. The Citi Bike utility bicycles are slower than most utility bicycles, averaging only 8.3 miles per hour (13.4 km/h) as opposed to regular bicycles' average speed of 11 to 12 miles per hour (18 to 19 km/h), which increases safety due to a lowered risk of a high-speed collision.

In 2015, Ben Serotta helped redesign the bicycle to include a new seat, a simpler gear shifting mechanism, fewer and brighter lights, and a European-style center kickstand. All of Citi Bike's bicycles were to be renovated to include this new design. In 2016, a thousand of the newly redesigned Citi Bikes were taken out of service due to a part in the front wheel degrading faster than expected. In 2017, CitiBike began adding NuVinci gear hubs that offer continuous-gear shifting. In early 2017, as part of a pilot program with a firm named Blaze, 250 bikes received anterior laser lights that project a teal silhouette on the ground to warn drivers and pedestrians in their path.

==== E-bikes ====
In addition to the regular utility bicycles, Citi Bike operates a fleet of pedal-assisted e-bikes; as part of a 2018 agreement between Lyft and the city government, e-bikes may not comprise more than one-fifth of the total fleet. By 2023, there were over 5,000 e-bikes; this had increased to 15,000 e-bikes by 2025. E-bikes comprised one-third of Citi Bike's fleet in 2024, accounting for two-thirds of all Citi Bike trips.

The bikes come in two models. The older model, introduced in 2018, has a range of 30 miles (48 km) and is a pedal-assist model that could theoretically travel up to 20 miles per hour (32 km/h). Silver e-bikes were introduced in 2022. The silver bikes have a 60-mile (97 km) range, hydraulic brakes, a single gear transmission, front lights, an LCD screen, and wider seats and can theoretically travel up to 20 miles per hour (32 km/h). Originally, neither model can be charged at a dock; employees manually removed dead batteries and charge them at a Citi Bike facility. Since 2024, there have been a limited number of e-bike charging stations. Because of a speed restriction imposed by Mayor Adams in June 2025, the e-bike motors disengage when the rider is traveling faster than 15 miles per hour (24 km/h).

=== Docking and transport ===
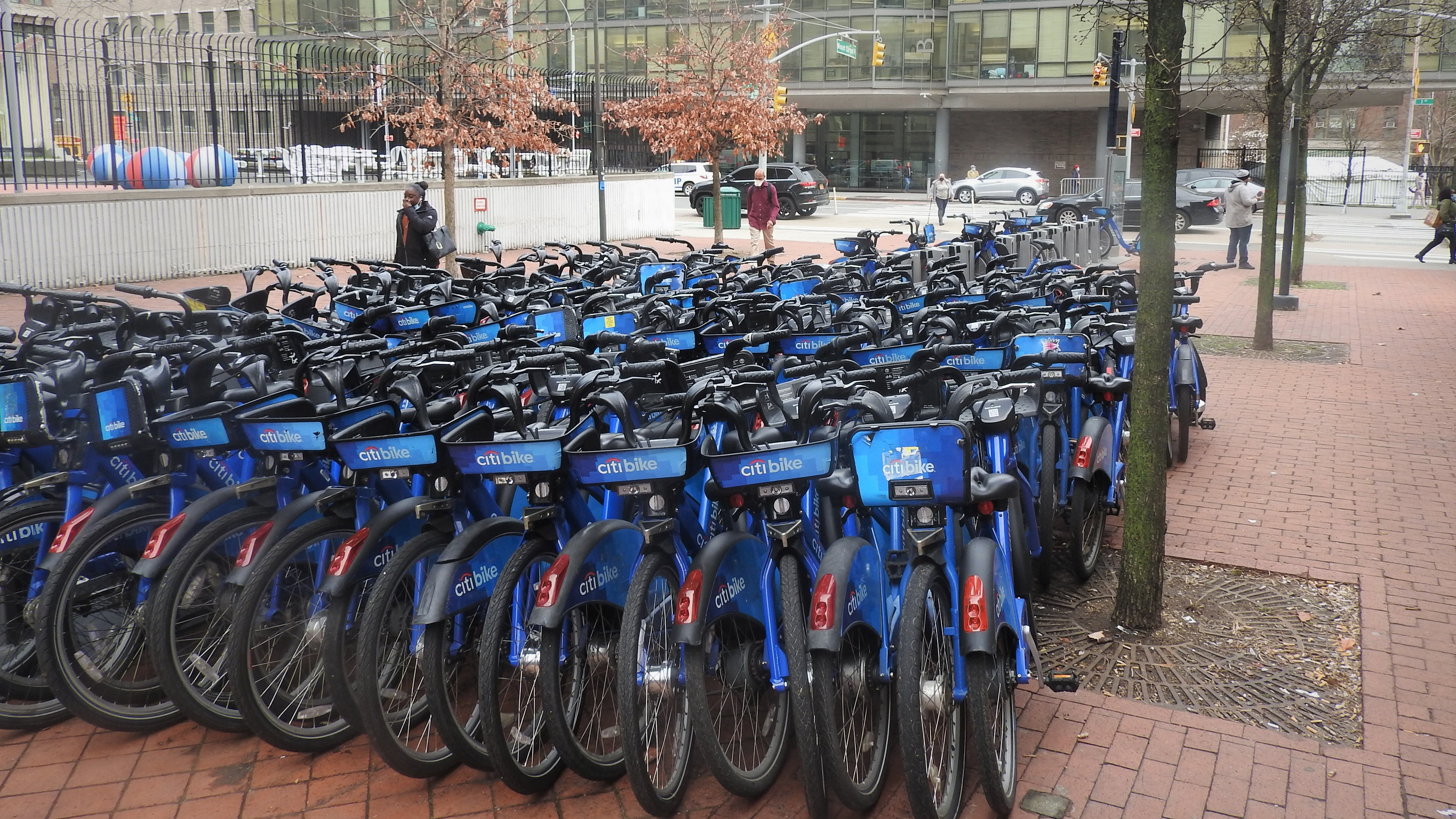
Bicycles awaiting rush hour

As of September 2023, Citi Bike has 1,915 docking stations. Citi Bike moves thousands of bikes each day from places where they accumulate to places where they are scarce, sometimes using vans to accomplish this task. Since May 2016, Citi Bike members have been allowed to move bikes between stations to earn incentives, including points that can be redeemed for cash. These members, called "Bike Angels", can earn rewards such as gift cards and renewed memberships. Almost 2,000 members participated in the program in the nine months after it was introduced, and there were 40,000 participants by 2018. As of 2022, there were 44,000 Bike Angels; the highest-paid angels sometimes earned several thousand dollars in a single month. Some angels participate in "station flipping", a controversial practice in which angels swap bikes between two nearby stations to maximize how many points they received.

If a user does not re-dock their bike within a certain time limit—45 minutes for members or 30 minutes for non-members—they will be charged an extra fee. Annual members are charged $2.50 for every 15 minutes of further use, day pass users are charged $4 for every 15 minutes of further use, and single ride users are charged $3 for every 30 minutes of additional use. If a bike is not returned at all within 24 hours, a maximum "late fee" of $1,200 can be charged, though the fine may be reduced based on financial circumstances. If a Citi Bike is lost or stolen, the member who last used it must file a theft report with the New York City Police Department within 24 hours, and they would be charged the maximum late fee. Before the expansion of the Citi Bike network into these areas, stolen Citi Bikes were found in parts of Brooklyn and in Upper Manhattan. At least one man has ridden a Citi Bike as far as California. Citi Bike Boyz, a popular Instagram account, has become famous for posting daredevil stunts performed on a Citi Bike.

== Payment ==
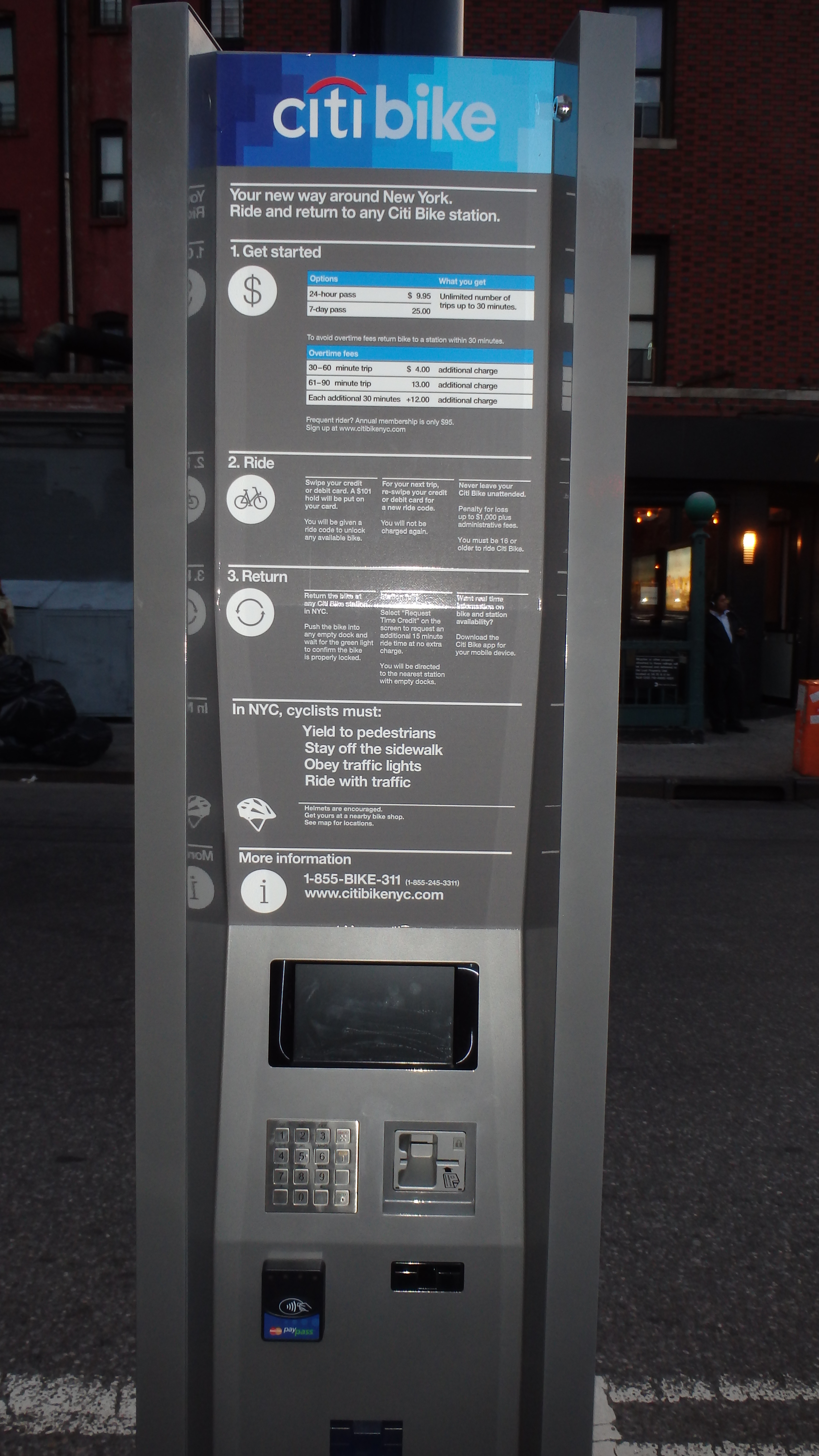
Close-up of pay station on the Lower East Side

As of July 2025, annual membership costs $219.99, or $18.33 per month. A reduced-fare pass is available to New York City Housing Authority residents who are 16 or older, members of selected credit unions, or recipients of SNAP benefits. Citibank card holders receive a 10% discount when purchasing annual memberships through the Citi Bike website. Annual pass members receive a key and can make trips of up to 45 minutes without added charge, after which they pay a fee for each additional 15 minutes.

Initially, both daily and weekday passes were sold at Citi Bike docking stations. As of July 2025, Citi Bike a day pass, costing $25 and allows unlimited 30 minute rides, and a single ride pass for $4.99, also limited to 30 minutes. For every minute past the 30 minute limit, riders are charged $0.38/min for every minute thereafter. The 8.875% New York State sales tax is added to the cost of all passes. Trips on electric bikes cost an additional fee per minute, though members pay discounted rates. Day pass users pay an additional fee if they upgrade to an electric bike.

All payments are by credit card; Wageworks and Transitchek prepaid commuter cards are not accepted, as bike sharing programs do not qualify as eligible commuting expenses under US tax law. The Lyft Pink All Access subscription, which costs $199 per year, launched in August 2021 and also allows passholders to make unlimited Citi Bike trips. Pink All Access Subscribers are also allowed to ride up to 45 minutes and are charged a reduced amount of $0.25 per minute for every minute thereafter as of July 2025. Transportation Alternatives has called for city employees to be given free Citi Bike memberships, and for discounted memberships to be given to seniors and high school students aged 16 and over.

== Usage ==
In Citi Bike's first year, the majority of riders were male; women made a quarter of the trips and comprised a third of membership. Citi Bike had 5.8 million annual trips in 2013, increasing to 8 million trips in 2014; 10 million in 2015; 14.1 million in 2016; 16.4 million in 2017; and 17.6 million in 2018. When Citi Bike recorded 70,286 trips on July 26, 2017, it was called "the highest single-day ridership of any [bike share] system in the Western world outside of Paris"; at the time, most riders were still male and in their 30s or younger. Ridership reached nearly 21 million in 2019; despite a slight downturn in 2020 due to the COVID-19 pandemic, ridership grew further to 28 million in 2021. By 2022, the service saw almost 30 million trips a year. Just over half of riders came from majority-minority communities in May 2023.

As of May 2025, there were on average 142,553 rides per day and each bike was being used 1.99 times per day. 14,597 annual members and 202,737 casual members signed up or renewed in May 2025 and total annual membership was at 131,451 annual members. 18,957 single-day passes were purchased in May 2025. There also were 2,806 stations active with 37,652 bikes in the fleet as of May 31, 2025. 86,887 bike/dock actions occurred during May 2025, averaging 2,802 actions per day.

== Issues ==
When Citi Bike first launched, at least one bike shop owner said that he was forced to close down his business in 2014 due to the popularity of Citi Bike. Dorothy Rabinowitz of The Wall Street Journal said, a few days after the system opened, that under the "autocratic" mayoralty of Michael Bloomberg, "we now look at a city whose best neighborhoods are absolutely begrimed by these blazing blue Citibank bikes." Some people disliked the bright blue color and branding of the bicycles, while others pointed out that the stations blocked fire hydrants on the street. The concrete wheel stops at the end of each kiosk also posed a hazard, acting as a sudden, sharp speed bump. Another complaint was that bike stations take up a car parking space for each eight bikes, a sentiment repeated in future dock installations.

Later expansions had too few stations: one Streetsblog writer noted that the stations in the expansions were spaced farther apart than the stations in the original service area, which would make the Citi Bike stations in these areas harder to access. In September 2017, a reporter for Time Out magazine wrote that the system did not serve the outer boroughs adequately, with stations only located in wealthier areas of Manhattan, Brooklyn, and Queens that were closer to the Manhattan central business districts. A Curbed reporter wrote in mid-2023 that Citi Bike's e-bikes were often broken. A November 2023 report by New York City Comptroller Brad Lander found that issues with Citi Bikes, such as empty or full docking stations and broken bicycles, were most prevalent in neighborhoods with high minority populations, including several in Brooklyn. Additionally, the Bronx had higher rates of non-functional stations than the other boroughs with Citi Bike stations.

== See also ==
- Cycling in New York City
- Cycling in Jersey City
- List of bicycle-sharing systems
