= Rebekah Scheinfeld =

Former CDOT commissioner

Rebekah Scheinfeld was the Commissioner of the Chicago Department of Transportation (CDOT), appointed by mayor Rahm Emanuel in 2014. She resigned in May 2019.

As transportation commissioner, Scheinfeld oversaw projects including the Chicago Riverwalk and the 606 trail. She was involved in initiatives to promote pedestrian safety and endorsed the deployment of red-light and speed cameras. She was also involved with the expansion of bike-sharing throughout the city under an agreement with car-sharing service Lyft.

Before joining CDOT, Scheinfeld worked at the Chicago Transit Authority and planned projects such as the Red Line reconstruction and new bus rapid transit corridors. She has also worked at the New York City Department of Parks and Recreation and the law firm Mayer Brown.

In 2020, Scheinfeld was named CEO of the Civic Consulting Alliance, a non-profit organization serving the city of Chicago.
