= Chicago Department of Transportation =

Government entity in Chicago, Illinois, US

Department overview
- Formed: December 11, 1991; 34 years ago
- Preceding Department: Chicago Department of Public Works
- Jurisdiction: Government of Chicago
- Headquarters: 2 N. LaSalle Street, Suite 1110; Chicago, IL 60602
- Employees: 1242 (Sep. 2017)
- Annual budget: $1.48 billion (2024)
- Department executive: William Cheaks, Jr., Commissioner
- Key document: Municipal Code of Chicago, Chapter 2-102

The Chicago Department of Transportation (CDOT /ˈsiːdɒt/) is an executive department of the City of Chicago responsible for the safety, environmental sustainability, maintenance, and aesthetics of the surface transportation networks and public ways within the city. This includes the planning, design, construction, and management of streets, sidewalks, bridges, and alleys.

CDOT is headed by the Commissioner of Transportation, an appointee and cabinet member of the Mayor of Chicago. The second in command at CDOT is the First Deputy Commissioner, who serves as a liaison between the Commissioner's office and the various operational sections. Managing Deputy Commissioners may also be placed by the Commissioner for assistance in policy and operational oversight.

CDOT is organized into several Divisions each headed by a Deputy Commissioner, including the Divisions of Administration, Project Development, Engineering, In-House Construction, Electrical Operations, Sign Management, Traffic Safety, and Infrastructure Management.

== History ==
CDOT was established by order of the Chicago City Council on 11 December 1991 when Mayor Richard M. Daley restructured the Chicago Department of Public Works into the new Chicago Department of Transportation. The restructuring took effect on 1 January 1992. John N. LaPlante, who was appointed as Acting Commissioner of Public Works in September 1991, continued as the first Acting Commissioner of CDOT.

In 2011, the Chicago Department of Environment was disbanded and absorbed by other city departments including General Services, Public Health, Family and Support Services, and Water Management. The Department of Transportation took over Environment's Clean Vehicles Initiative.

=== Department of Public Works ===
Prior to the 1991 reorganization, the responsibilities of the Department of Transportation (and several other current city departments) belonged to the Chicago Department of Public Works. The Department of Public Works was first recognized as a branch of the city administration in 1861, at which point it consolidated the services of water, sewerage, parks, streets, river and harbor, and public buildings. Initially, the department was headed by an elective board of public works. In 1867, the board became appointive, and in 1876, the board was completely abolished in favor of a single commissioner. Mayor Heath served as the first temporary head of the department until a commissioner was provided in May, 1879. The office of deputy-commissioner was created in 1892. At the time of creation (but no longer the case), the position was at the appointment of the mayor, which created a confusing line of responsibility for the heads of the department.

After the abolishment of the three-man board in 1876, the department was composed of the bureaus of water, sewerage, streets, special assessment, engineering, and maps.

=== List of commissioners ===
Since the Department's inception in 1991, the position of Commissioner of Transportation has been filled fourteen times by thirteen individuals, including five official "Acting Commissioners".

#	Name	Appointment	Departure	Notes
1	John N. LaPlante	2 Sep 1991	14 Apr 1992	Acting
2	Joseph F. Boyle	20 May 1992	1995	
3	Thomas K. Walker	2 Oct 1995	1999	
4	Judith C. Rice	3 Nov 1999	2000	
5	Miguel A. d'Escoto	2001	16 Jun 2005	
6	Cherilyn H. Heramb	2005	2007	Acting
7	Thomas G. Byrne	2007	2009	
8	Thomas Powers	2009	2010	Acting
9	Bobby L. Ware	14 May 2010	2011	
10	Gabe Klein	18 May 2011	30 Nov 2013	
11	Rebekah Scheinfeld	31 Dec 2013	20 May 2019	
12	Thomas R. Carney	21 May 2019	10 Dec 2019	Acting
13	Gia Biagi	10 Dec 2019	11 Aug 2023	
14	Thomas R. Carney	22 Dec 2023	3 Jul 2025	Acting from Aug. to Dec. 2023
15	Craig Turner	4 Jul 2025	8 April 2026	Acting
16	William Cheaks, Jr.	8 April 2026	Present	

== Scandals ==
=== 1992 Chicago Flood ===
On April 13, 1992, a damaged utility tunnel wall beneath the Chicago River opened into a breach which flooded basements and underground facilities throughout the Chicago Loop with an estimated 250 million US gallons (950,000 m^{3}) of water.

Investigation into the incident revealed that the tunnel damage was a result of new pilings installed near the Kinzie Street Bridge, which created a slow leak that had been discovered in January of that year. Citing a lack of immediate response to the issue, Mayor Richard M. Daley requested Acting Commissioner John N. LaPlante for a letter of resignation after the tunnel was patched and the flood contained.

Upon LaPlante's resignation, Gery J. Chico, Mayor Daley's Deputy Chief of Staff, took control of the Department of Transportation eventually handing the reins to a newly appointed Commissioner, Joseph Boyle.

=== 50/50 Sidewalks ===
In October 2005, the Chicago Sun-Times reported on CDOT's 50/50 Sidewalk Program. The program was billed as a way for home-owners to evenly split the cost with the city to replace public sidewalks in front of their homes. The report found that most homeowners paid more than 50% of the final construction cost. CDOT subsequently renamed the 40-year-old program to Shared-Cost Sidewalk Program.

=== Redflex Scandal ===
In late 2010, executives from Redflex Holdings, the contractor responsible for providing red-light enforcement cameras to CDOT, were implicated in a bribery scandal. The Chicago Tribune reported that a Redflex 'consultant' had been making improper payments to a City of Chicago transportation official, John Bills, who was responsible for overseeing the awarding of contracts for the installation and operation of the widely hated red light camera system. The consultant, Marty O'Malley, who was a long time friend of Bills hired to oversee the Chicago contract, had received US$570,000 in commissions for the contract which had provided approximately US$100 million in revenue for Redflex. A hired investigator found that Redflex had provided Bills with lavish vacations expensed directly on the expense report of Redflex Executive Vice-President Aaron Rosenberg, who had also 'gifted' Bills with trips to the Super Bowl and White Sox spring training over many years, valued at up to US$2 million. In February 2013, Chicago's Department of Procurement Services notified Redflex they would not be considered for an upcoming red light camera RFP.

=== Public Bike Share ===
In April 2012, the Chicago Sun-Times reported on vendor selection improprieties for the new public bike share program, known as Divvy. That program contract was awarded to Alta Bicycle Share, however, Josh Squire, the owner of the competing vendor, Bike Chicago, claimed that then current Commissioner Gabe Klein failed to disclose former ties to the winning bidder, specifically that he had worked for Alta in 2011.
