= SmartBike DC =

Defunct Washington, D.C. bicycle sharing system

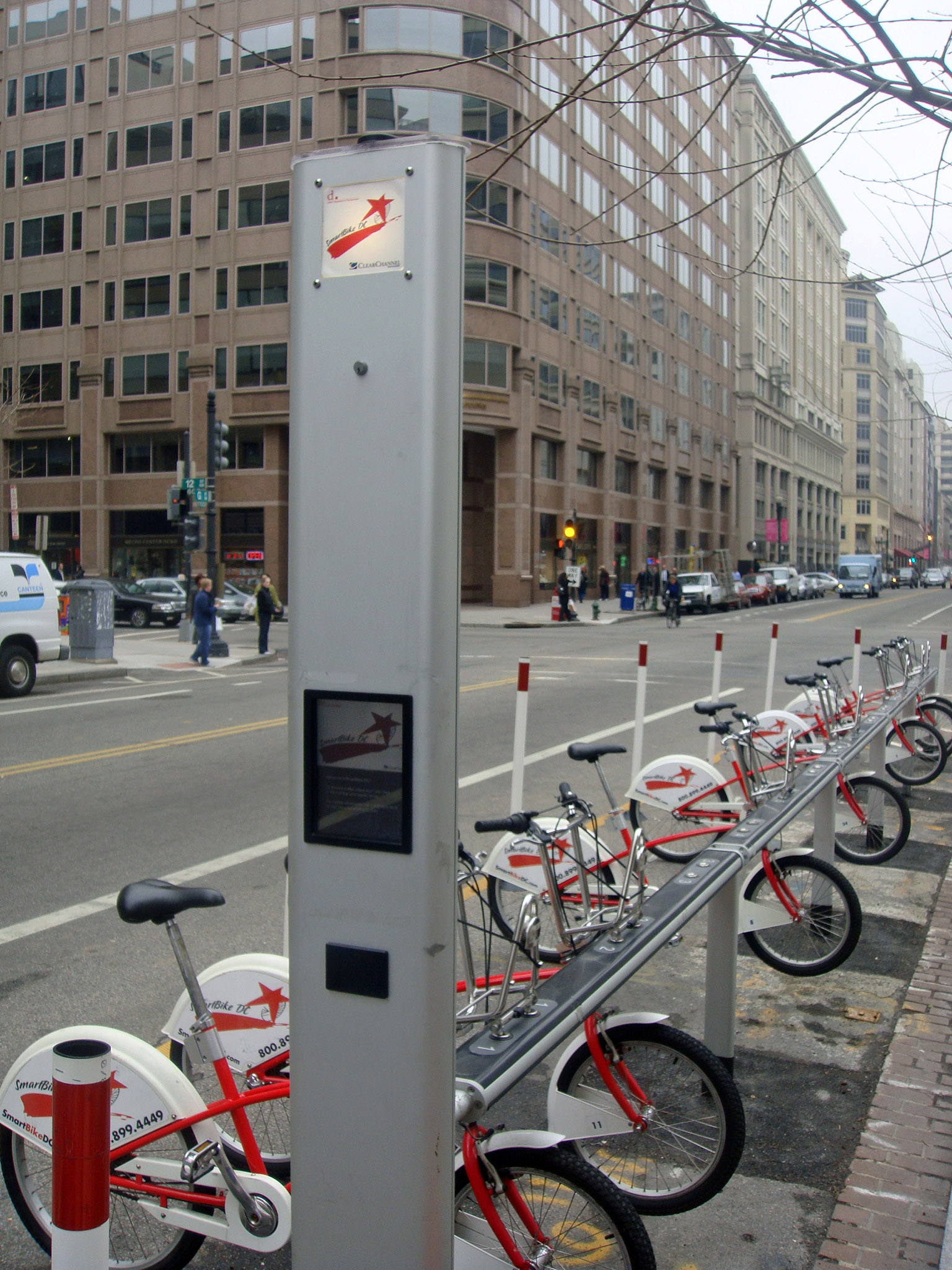
SmartBike DC rental station located in downtown Washington, D.C., near Metro Center station

SmartBike DC was a bicycle sharing system implemented in August 2008 with 120 bicycles and 10 automated rental locations in the central business district of Washington, D.C. The network was the first of its kind in North America, but was replaced by the much larger, publicly funded Capital Bikeshare system in the fall of 2010. SmartBike DC officially ceased operations in January 2011.

The program was a public-private partnership between the District of Columbia Department of Transportation and the advertising firm Clear Channel Outdoor, which operated similar automated bike rental systems in France, Norway, Sweden and Spain. The "computerized bicycle rental program" was included, at the insistence of then DC Department of Transportation (DDOT) Director Dan Tangherlini, in the city's September 2005 bus shelter contract with Clear Channel Adshel. However, it took nearly three years for the program to launch, which was near the end of Mayor Anthony Williams term. Annual operating costs of the system were funded by a combination of advertising revenues and user subscription and/or rental fees, and DC received quarterly payments based on membership dues. It included 100 bikes at 10 stations.

New DDOT Director Gabe Klein came into office four months after the program launched eager to expand it, but found the private partner had a "lackluster commitment." The agreement specifically prohibited DDOT from paying for anything related to SmartBike, so an expansion required DDOT to renegotiate the contract. In his first meeting with Clear Channel he found that Clear Channel believed they had gotten a bad deal on the original bus shelter contract, that following their purchase by Bain Capital they were no longer interested in “municipal street furniture” and that they had neither desire nor obligation to expand the program. In addition the technology was already dated. Each dock had to be hard-wired to the electrical grid, requiring coordination with the power company and digging at each location. Installation took nine months. Meanwhile, new solar powered systems that could be installed in a day - and moved as needed - were coming on the market. As a result, Klein chose to fold the program and instead partner with Arlington County, VA to build the regional bikesharing program Capital Bikeshare. A few months after Capital Bikeshare started in late 2010, Smart Bike DC ceased operations.

Afterwards, the bikes were donated by ClearChannel to a Baltimore charity, the stations were removed in April of 2011 at ClearChannel's expense and the contract was modified to remove all references to SmartBike.

Once closure was guaranteed, the program was criticized by The Washington City Paper for its low usage and limited number of bike stations. Despite this, the program is considered a success by others, as it provided proof of concept for its improved and vastly expanded replacement, Capital Bikeshare, as well as other bikeshare systems across the nation. It also allowed DDOT to develop in-house knowledge of bikesharing.

== See also ==
- Capital Bikeshare
- Transportation in Washington, D.C.
