= Divvy =

Chicago-based bike sharing system

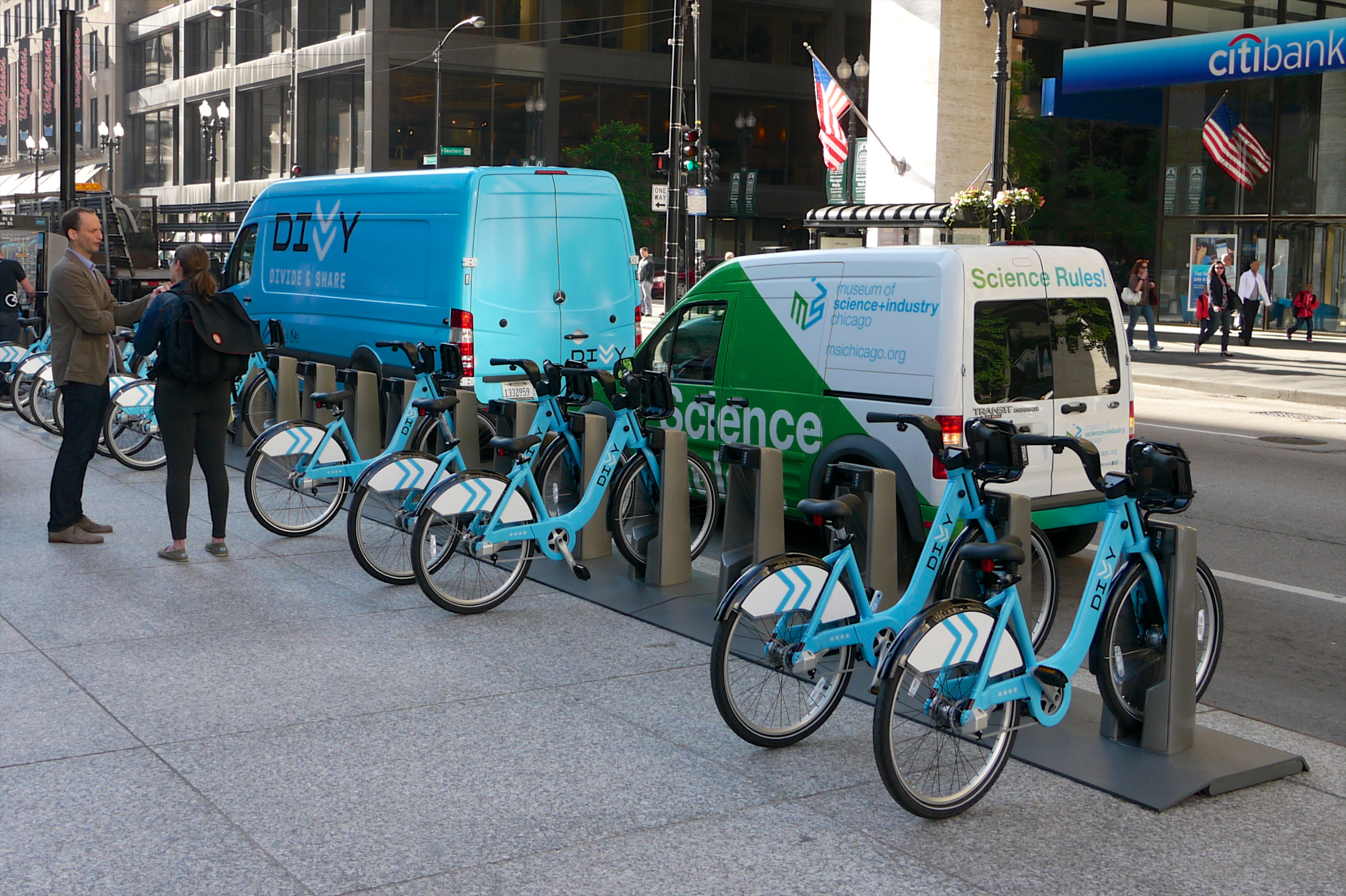
- Dearborn & Washington Divvy Station, Chicago Loop

Overview
- Owner: City of Chicago
- Locale: Chicago, IL, U.S.
- Transit type: Bicycle sharing system
- Number of stations: 1,000+
- Annual ridership: 6,681,480 bike and scooter trips (2024)
- Website: divvybikes.com

Operation
- Began operation: June 28, 2013; 13 years ago
- Operator: Lyft
- Number of vehicles: Over 15,000

Divvy is the bicycle sharing system in the Chicago metropolitan area, currently serving the cities of Chicago and Evanston. The system is owned by the Chicago Department of Transportation and has been operated by Lyft since 2019. As of May 2023, Divvy was the largest bicycle sharing system by area in North America with a service area of 234 square miles. In August 2024, the 1,000th Divvy station opened as part of a citywide expansion of 400 new stations. As of November 2025, there were 1,136 Divvy stations throughout Chicago and Evanston.

== History ==
In 2007, Chicago Mayor Richard M. Daley visited Paris, France, where he tested their Vélib' bicycle sharing system and was "greatly impressed". He determined that a similar system would work well in Chicago. After returning from his European trip, Mayor Daley requested proposals from private partners to create a bike share system for Chicago. Two potential operators came forward but submitted plans that would have been too expensive for the city to fund.

Divvy installation at Pritzker Park

In May 2012, the City of Chicago awarded Alta Bicycle Share (acquired by Bikeshare Holdings LLC in 2014 and renamed to Motivate) a contract for "the purchase, installation, and operation of a bicycle sharing system".

On June 28, 2013, Divvy launched with 750 bikes at 75 stations in an area from the Loop north to Berwyn Ave, west to Kedzie Ave, and south to 59th St. A planned expansion of the number of stations in spring 2014 was delayed to 2015 due to supply shortages.

=== Unionization ===
In October 2014, TWU (Transport Workers' Union) Local 100 of New York City filed an election petition with the NLRB seeking to represent "almost 70 full-time and part-time workers, including mechanics and truck drivers, who are paid $12 to $16 an hour."

The unionization effort came after employees of Citi Bike in NYC, owned by the same parent company Motivate (formerly Alta Bicycle Share), joined TWU Local 100 in September 2014 and alongside similar efforts by employees of Motivate in Boston (Hubway) and Washington, D.C. (Capital Bikeshare).

=== 2019 expansion ===
In March 2019, Mayor Rahm Emanuel proposed a 9-year contract to grant Lyft (owner of Motivate) exclusive rights to operate the city-owned system and receive a portion of the subsequent advertisement revenue. The deal required Lyft to invest US$50 million to add 175 stations and 10,500 bikes to the system, expand to all 50 city wards by 2021, and add electric pedal bikes which could lock to both Divvy stations and conventional bike racks. Lyft would additionally be required to make annual payments to the city starting at US$6 million and increasing by 4 percent each year; the city would share in at least US$1.5 million in advertisement revenue each year.

The proposal passed a Pedestrian and Traffic Safety Committee vote in the City Council on April 8 and was approved by the full City Council on April 10.

=== Post-pandemic performance ===
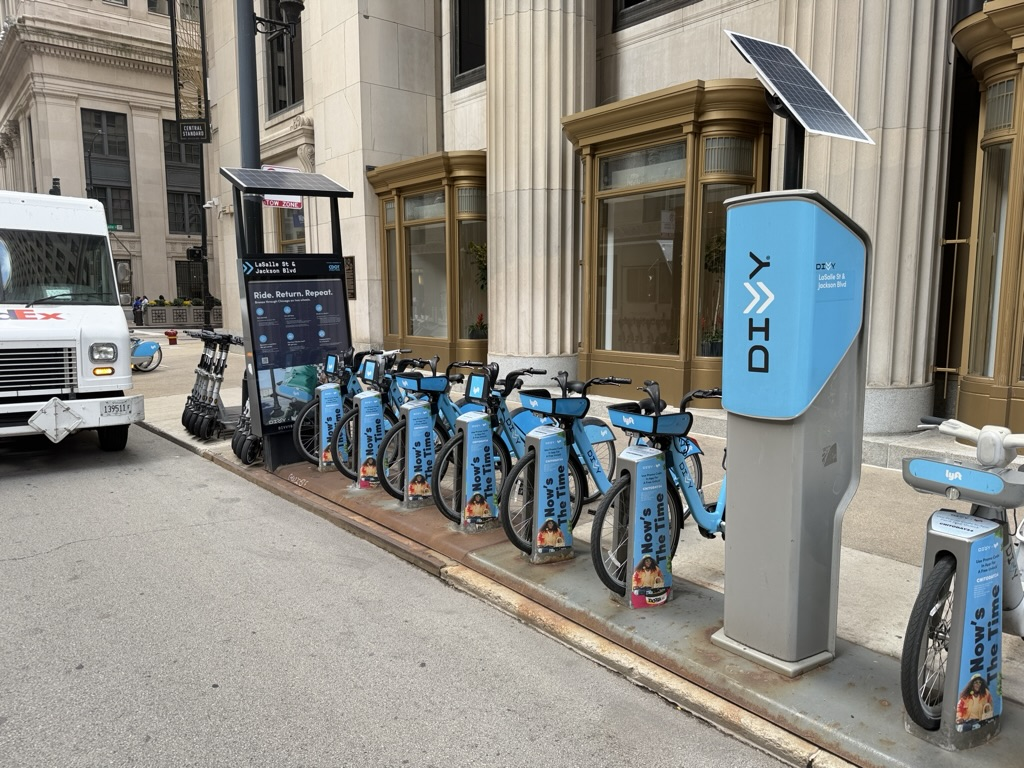
Divvy station in 2025.

Since COVID, the Divvy network has continued to grow. As of May 2025, Divvy has over 1,000 stations, mostly within Chicago city limits, with numerous stations in Evanston as well. Divvy covers a total of 234 square miles, the largest service area of any bicycle sharing system in North America. Recent additions have allowed Divvy to meet the City of Chicago's stated goal of achieving four stations per square mile, thus allowing every Chicagoan to be within a short distance of a Divvy station.

Divvy's success has driven bike and scooter trips in Chicago to new highs, with more than 11 million trips recorded across all bikes and scooters in 2024 (including roughly 7 million from Divvy). Much of this can be attributed to the system's rapid geographic expansion, as well as targeted investments in stations near key transit connection points - such as the Peterson / Ridge Metra Station and the CTA's Damen Green Line Station and Orange Line Midway Stations. In tandem with Divvy's growing footprint, the Chicago Department of Transportation (CDOT) has also worked to install bikeways to promote usage, with more than 50 miles of bike route being added in 2023 alone. Development of the Divvy network has helped Chicago achieve the nation's fastest growth in cycling trips, up 119% from 2019 to 2023, with particularly robust increases among communities on the Far South Side and northern lakefront.

== Branding ==
The name Divvy is a playful reference to sharing ("divvy it up"). Divvy's light-blue color palette and four stars evoke the Chicago flag. The double Vs in the Divvy logo refer to the shared-lane markers painted on bike lanes throughout the city, and are a nod to how the city prioritizes bike safety, paving the way for new riders.

The naming, logo, and brand strategy for the system was developed through a partnership between the global design firm IDEO and the Chicago brand strategy studio Firebelly Design. IDEO led the project's research, conceptual brand development, and naming phases; Firebelly team led the identity design, communication system and brand guideline phases.

The first 4,000 Founding Members received limited edition black keys; regular members received blue keys.

== Equipment ==
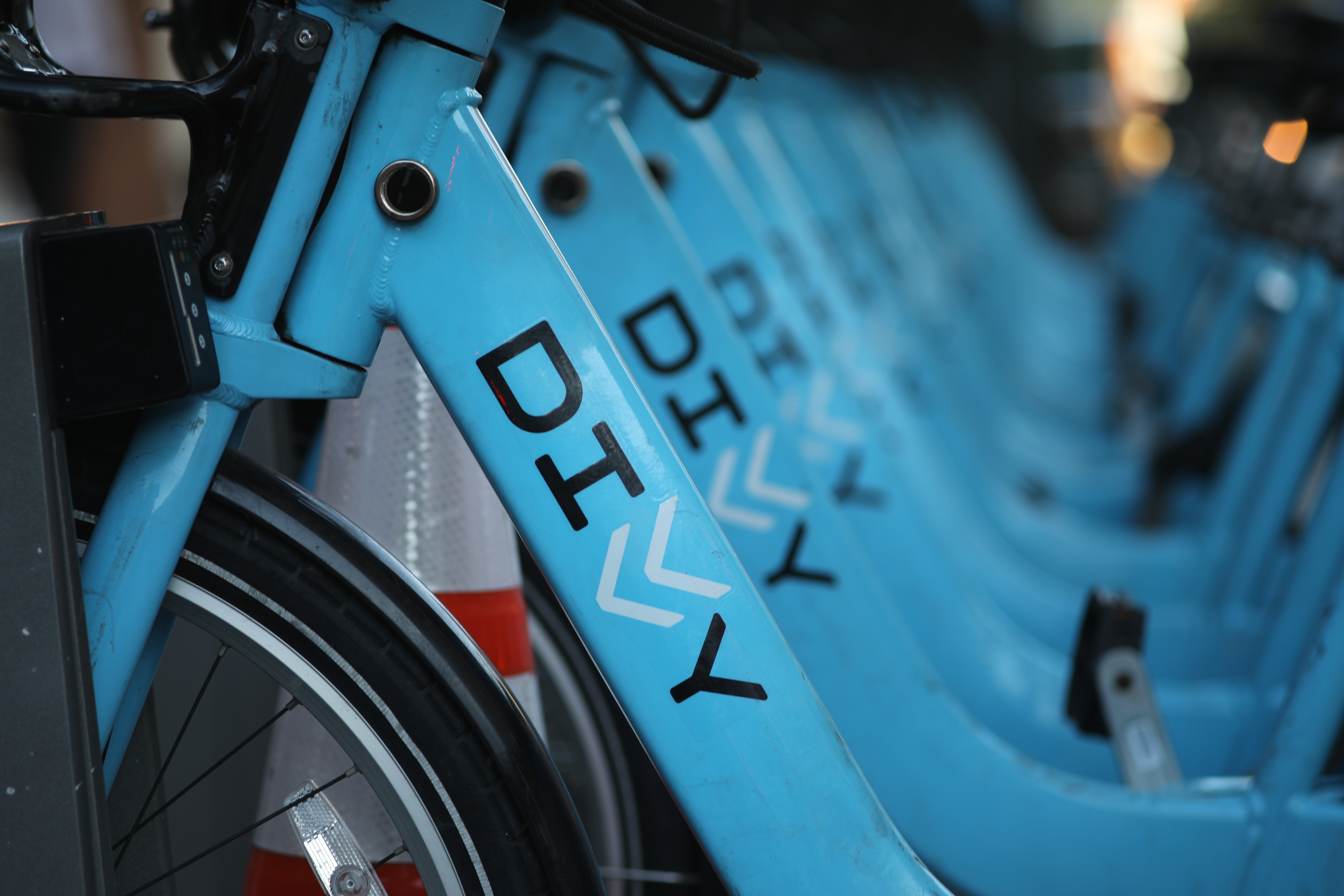
Divvy bikes in Chicago

Divvy bicycles are utility bicycles with a unisex step-through frame that provides a lower center of gravity and ease of access to a wide range of heights. All bikes are painted "Chicago blue", with the exception of one "unicorn bike": a bright red bike, dubbed #Divvyred.

The one-piece aluminum frame and handlebars conceal cables to protect them from vandalism and inclement weather. The heavy-duty tires are designed to be puncture-resistant and filled with nitrogen to maintain proper inflation pressure longer. Front and rear flashing LED lights are integrated into the frame, which weighs approximately 40 lb (18 kg). Divvy bikes have three speeds, a bell, and a front rack.

The bikes are manufactured in the Saguenay, Quebec region by Cycles Devinci. PBSC Urban Solutions supplies bicycles, docking stations, and payment kiosks for the system.

Through the end of October 2014, the Chicago Blackhawks partnered with Divvy to release five black and red Blackhawks-branded bikes.

== See also ==
- Cycling in Chicago
- List of bicycle-sharing systems
