= Capital Bikeshare =

Bike sharing system in the Washington, D.C., area

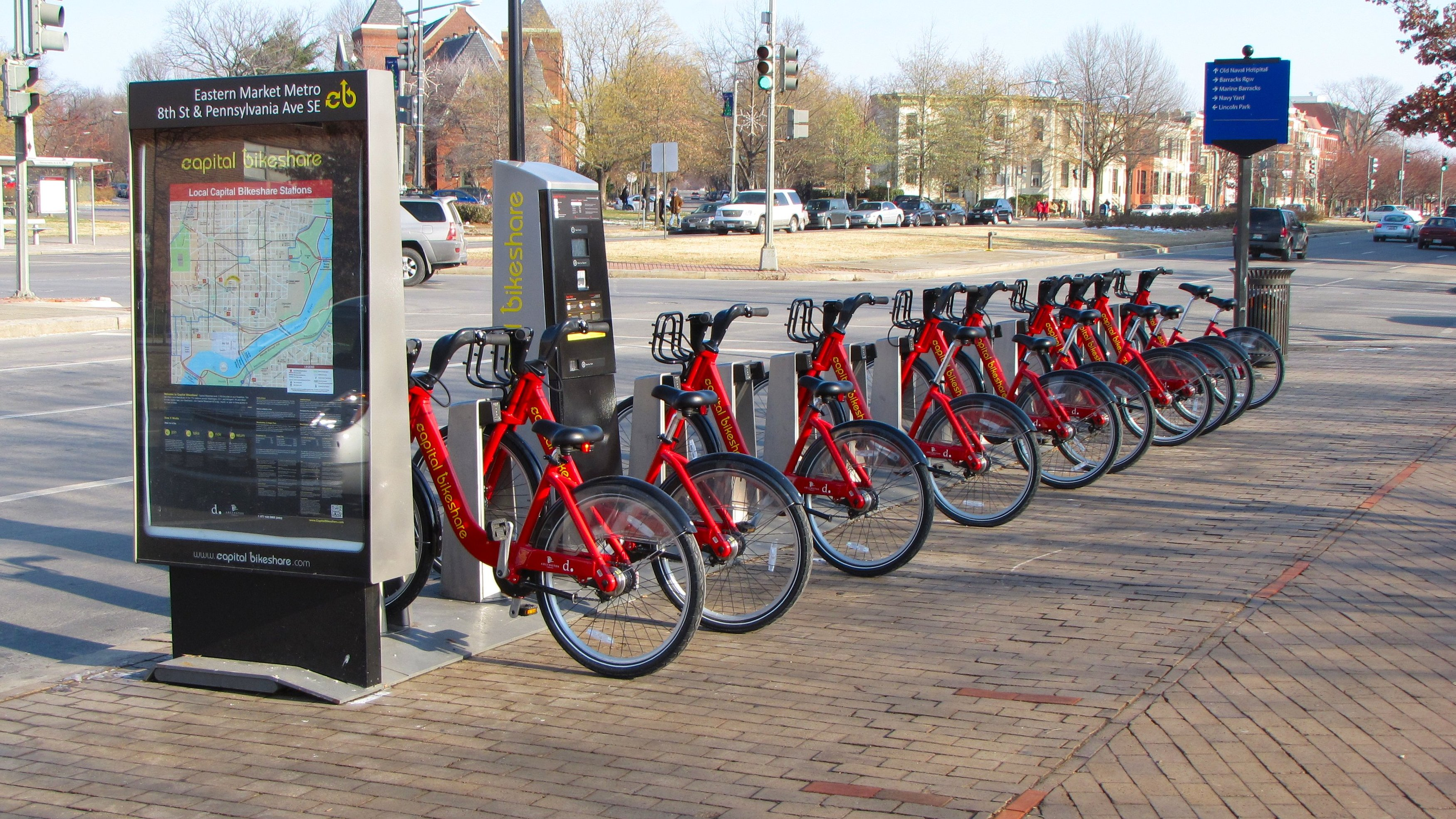
- Capital Bikeshare rental station near Eastern Market station on Capitol Hill, the first station installed

Overview
- Owner: Eight local governments of the areas served
- Area served: Washington, D.C.; Northern Virginia; Alexandria; Arlington County; Fairfax County; Fairfax City; Falls Church; Maryland; Montgomery County; Prince George's County
- Locale: Washington metropolitan area
- Transit type: Bicycle-sharing system
- Number of stations: 801 (2025)
- Daily ridership: 10,844+ (2023)
- Annual ridership: 6.6 million+ (2025)
- Website: capitalbikeshare.com

Operation
- Began operation: September 20, 2010; 16 years ago
- Operator: Motivate
- Number of vehicles: 8,000+ (2020)

Capital Bikeshare (also abbreviated CaBi) is a bicycle-sharing system that serves Washington, D.C., and certain counties of the larger metropolitan area. As of August 2025, it had 800+ stations and more than 8,000 bicycles. Opened in September 20, 2010, the system is the largest municipality-owned bikeshare system in the United States.

== History ==
=== Genesis ===
The first of its kind in the US, SmartBike DC bike sharing service debuted in 2008 with 10 stations and 120 bicycles.

D.C. Department of Transportation Director Gabe Klein came into office four months later and was eager to expand it but found the private partner had a "lackluster commitment." Because the agreement specifically prohibited DDOT from paying for anything related to SmartBike, an expansion required DDOT to renegotiate the contract. But in his first meeting with Clear Channel he found that Clear Channel believed they had gotten a bad deal on the original contract that created SmartBike; that following their purchase by Bain Capital they were no longer interested in "municipal street furniture" and that they had neither desire nor obligation to expand the program. In addition, it was difficult and expensive to install new stations, because they required the local utility company to bring electricity to each station. As a result, Klein chose to end the program and instead work with Arlington County, Virginia, to build a new, regional bikesharing program to be called Capital Bikeshare.

Capital Bikeshare was to be owned by the local governments and operated by a private operator. Alta Bike Share received the operations contract. Planning and implementation costs for the new system totaled $5 million.

=== Launch ===
The new service launched in September 2010 with 400 bicycles at 49 stations. Shortly thereafter, in January 2011, SmartBike DC ceased operations.

Planning and implementation costs for Capital Bikeshare totaled $5 million, with additional first-year operating costs of US$2.3 million for 100 stations. The District's share of planning, implementation and first-year operating costs was partially financed by a $6 million grant by the United States Department of Transportation. Arlington County's operating cost share of the plan was $835,000 for the first year, funded by public contributions including a grant from the Virginia Department of Rail and Public Transportation and subsidies from Arlington County Transportation, Crystal City Business Improvement District, and the Potomac Yard Transportation Management Association. In April 2011, Capital Bikeshare administrators said they expect earned revenue to cover 50% of the system's annual operating costs. The District of Columbia also planned to sell advertising on Capital Bikeshare stations with the goal of raising US$500,000.

By February 2011, Capital Bikeshare had expanded to 100 stations in the District of Columbia and 14 stations in the Pentagon City, Potomac Yard, and Crystal City neighborhoods in Arlington. In April 2011, it had 11,000 members and 1,100 bikes in circulation. In September 2011, Capital Bikeshare announced it had reached 18,000 members and one million rides in its first year of operation, doubling initial expectations. During the summer of 2013, riders averaged almost 300,000 rides per month. That means that during the peak season, each bike was being used about four times per day. Throughout 2013, users traveled almost 2.5 million miles and burned 100 million calories. The average weekly savings was calculated as $15.39; the total annual savings for the roughly 24,000 members was about $370,000.

The National Park Service originally prohibited Capital Bikeshare stations on the property it manages, including large areas such as the National Mall. However, the agency later reversed itself and said that it would work to include new stations in future expansions. The first two of five approved Capital Bikeshare stations opened on the National Mall on March 16, 2012, shortly before the start of the 2012 National Cherry Blossom Festival.

In 2010, an unlisted Bikeshare station was installed on the White House grounds, inaccessible to the public. It was removed in August 2017 at the request of the Trump Administration, and returned in September 2021 at the request of the Biden administration. It was removed again in July, 2025.

=== Expansion ===
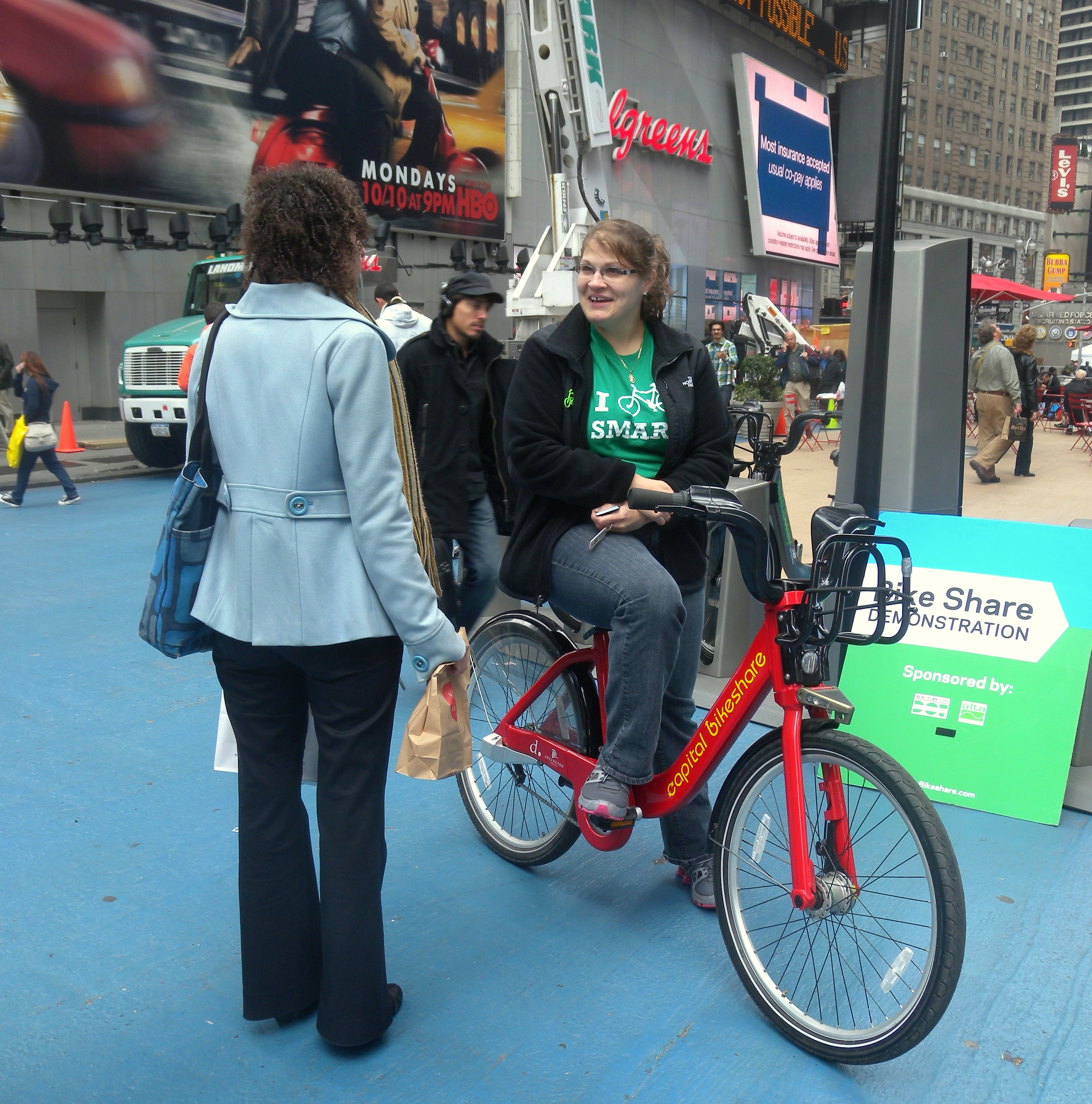
Capital Bikeshare demonstration in Times Square, New York City

Capital Bikeshare has grown steadily, which has driven demand for more stations and bikes. Transportation agencies in each jurisdiction select the location of the rental stations, as well as the number of bike docks, depending on planners' estimates of local demand. Most of the system's users live in or near central business districts; stations in the poorer eastern portion of the city are comparatively underused. Bikeshare stations near tourist destinations and local parks are also popular.

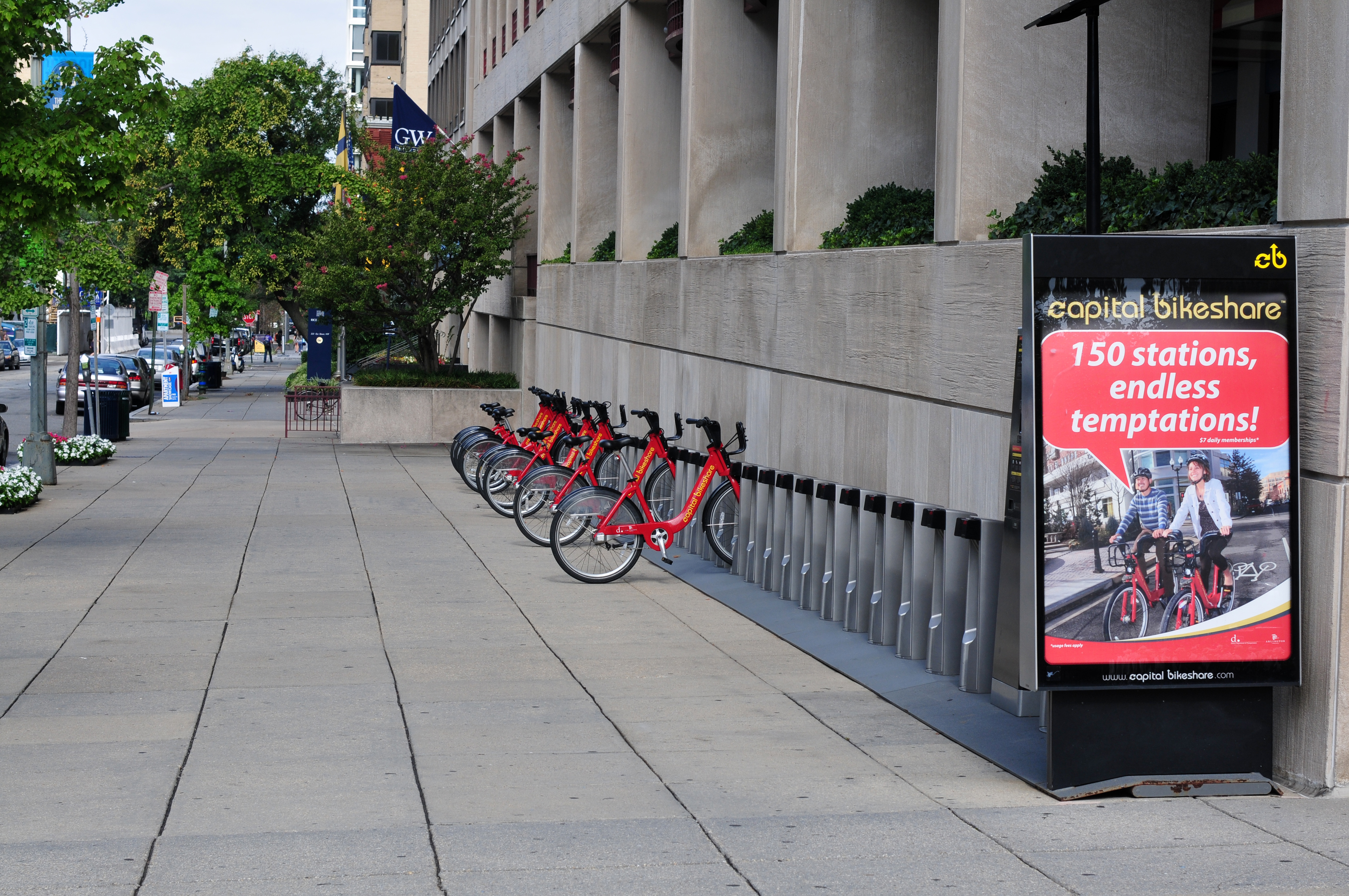
Station in the George Washington University

At the 2010 opening, local transportation officials were already talking about expanding the system throughout the D.C. area with visions of a 5,000 bicycle system within a few years.

In fall 2011, the District Department of Transportation announced plans to add 32 stations and expand 18 existing ones by year's end, then add 50 more in 2012.

Arlington County also announced plans to add 30 stations in fall 2011, primarily along the densely populated corridor between the Rosslyn and Ballston neighborhoods, and 30 more in 2012.

In October 2011, the neighboring city of Alexandria, Virginia, approved plans to deploy 54 bicycles at six stations in the Old Town and Carlyle neighborhoods in 2012, then add six more stations in 2013. The cost of the first year would be $400,000, including operating costs of $100,440. The first eight Alexandria stations were deployed in August 2012.

Montgomery County, Maryland joined Capital Bikeshare next, adding stations in 2013. In 2011, it approved plans to install 20 stations and 200 bikes in the Rockville and Shady Grove areas near Washington Metro stations and high-traffic destinations such as Montgomery College and Rockville Town Center. The expansion was paid for by a $1.288 million grant from the National Capital Region Transportation Planning Board with a $688,000 local match. Officials also cited plans to add 50 stations and 400 bicycles in southern areas of the county, including Bethesda, Silver Spring, Friendship Heights, and Takoma Park. However, bicycling advocates cautioned that clusters of stations in the county could be too far from each other as well as the larger network of stations within neighboring Washington, D.C. There was also concern that the county has too few bike lanes and trails to support the expected number of users. Despite these concerns, Montgomery County added its first stations in May 2013.

By September 2012, these additions and expansions were to have brought the network to 288 stations and 2,800 bikes in four jurisdictions.

In 2014, plans to add about 60 stations were put on hold after CaBi's main source for the bikes, the Montreal-based Public Bike System Co., went bankrupt. Over the next year, Capital Bikeshare bought used bikes and docks from the Ottawa bike-share system and new bikes from Motivate, a "New York-based company formed by investors who purchased previous operator Alta Bicycle Share." The expansion resumed in late 2015. In August 2015, Capital Bikeshare announced that it had found a new equipment supplier and would add 435 bikes and 40 stations in D.C. and 140 bikes and 20 stations elsewhere. It also reported having 29,000 members who had taken a total of more than 10.5 million trips.

On September 1, 2016, the system celebrated the installation of its 400th station at Division Ave & Foote St NE in Washington, DC. On October 21, 2016, Fairfax County, Virginia deployed 29 stations and 212 bikes in the Reston and Tysons Corner areas.

On June 1, 2018, Capital Bikeshare expanded its territory for bike rentals, establishing itself in Prince George’s County, which became the sixth jurisdiction to join the system. An official ceremony kicking off the service was held on June 1. Stations were originally located in Largo and Hyattsville, and then later expanded to Greenbelt, the area along Route 1, and National Harbor.

In May 2019, 11 new stations were added in the seventh member jurisdiction, Falls Church, Virginia.

Capital Bikeshare use rose during and after the Covid-19 pandemic, eventually breaking a five-year record in May 2023. As a result of the increased use, the DC government announced plans to expand the program in 2021. After receiving a grant from D.C.’s Department of Energy and Environment in March 2024, the system began upgrading stations with solar panels stations to charge e-bikes.

In August 2025, Capital Bikeshare expanded to the Herndon and Huntington areas in Fairfax County, completing a County goal of serving all Metro stations and reaching 81 of 98 Metro stations in the region.

Capital Bikeshare expanded to Vienna, Virginia with five stations in August 2026.

== Technology ==
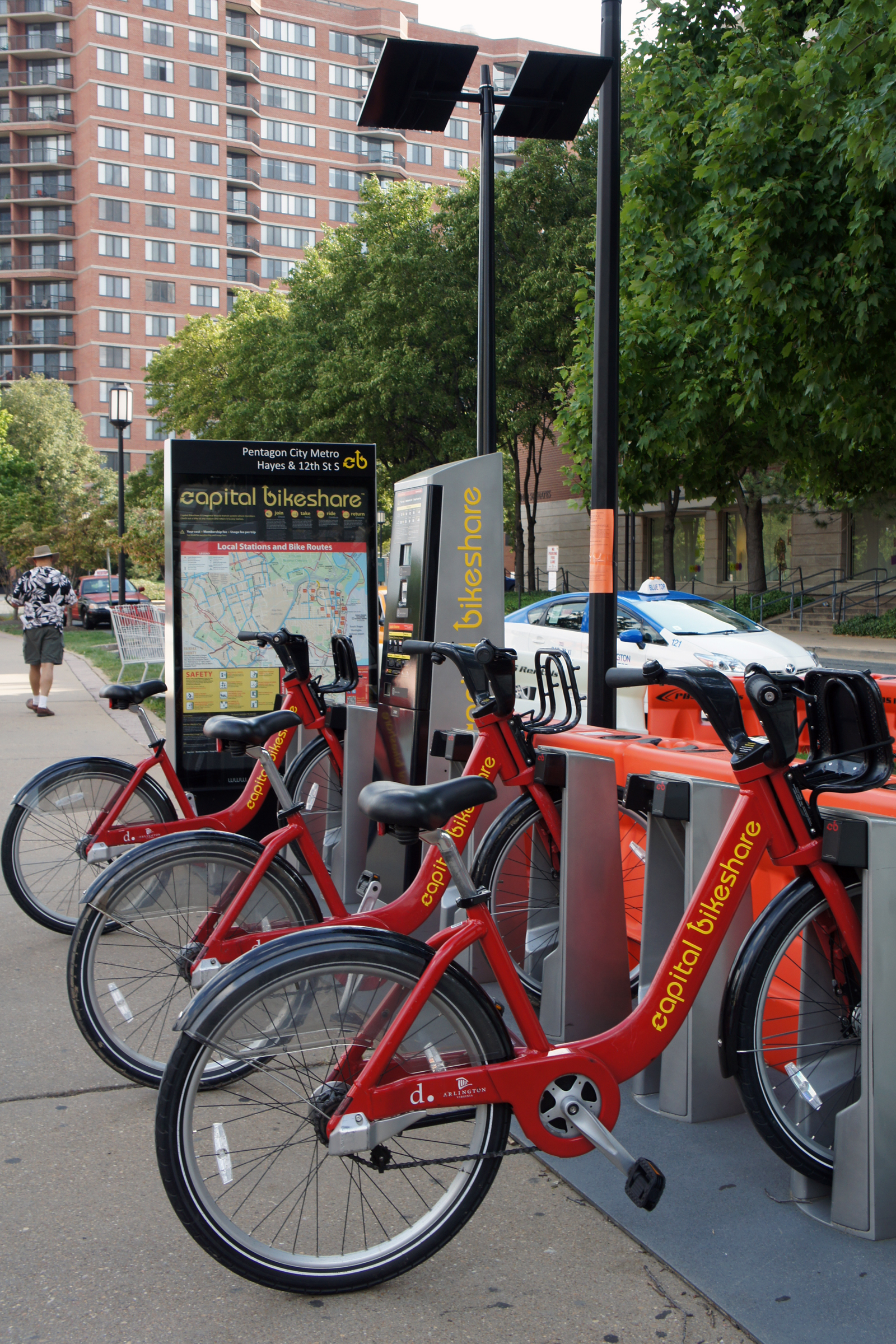
Capital Bikeshare automated rental facilities are powered with solar panels.

Capital Bikeshare uses the BIXI-branded system developed by Montreal-based PBSC Urban Solutions. The platform behind the bike share system is created by 8D Technologies, who also supply the server technology for BIXI Montréal, Citi Bike in New York City, Santander Cycles in London, and others.

Rental stations are automated and powered by solar panels, allowing them to be located anywhere space and sufficient sun are available. A wireless data link connects the docks and station kiosk to a central bike-tracking and billing database. Riders can use the Capital Bikeshare website and smartphone applications to see where rental stations are located and how many bikes and empty docks they have.

Each bike dock has a repair button; users press this to report a damaged or malfunctioning bike and take it out of service. Riders are expected to notify Capital Bikeshare if a bike cannot dock at a station and are responsible for the rented bike until it has been returned.

Unlike some other networks, Capital Bikeshare maintains service year-round except during severe weather.

Starting in 2021, the member jurisdictions began replacing the oldest stations with new equipment.

== Fleet ==
The original red-colored bicycle has three gears, a purse holder style basket, an adjustable seat, and a headlight and twin red taillights powered whenever the bicycle is in motion. This model was manufactured by Cycles Devinci in Quebec.

Subsequent models have an infinite gearing system from Enviolo and larger tray-like basket. Both PBSC and Lyft Canada (formerly 8D) supply classic bikes.

In November 2018, approximately 80 electric bikes, branded CaBi Plus, were introduced by Bikeshare operator’s parent company, Lyft, as a pilot. In April 2019, they were removed due to a braking issue.

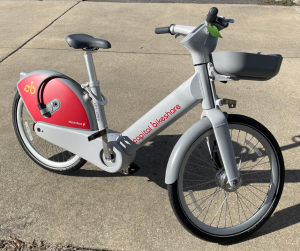
The 2023 ebike model

In July 2020, a new model of electric bike was introduced that fixed the braking issue and came with a front wheel motor, infinite shifting and a built in lock for dockless parking. Lyft owned the fleet, which started with 900 electric bikes, and collected most of the electric bike revenue to cover the additional operating cost. Deployment of electric bikes prioritized revenue and ridership although all jurisdictions received some electric bikes in addition to those ridden in from higher ridership areas.

On March 20, 2023, Capital Bikeshare launched a new version of their electric bike, all of which were owned by Arlington, Fairfax County and Washington, DC. The new bike had a retroreflective covering and larger battery. The system planned to rollout 850 new e-bikes, bringing the total number of bikes in the system close to 7,000. Capital Bikeshare began phasing out the 2020 bikes starting in August 2023.

== Pricing ==
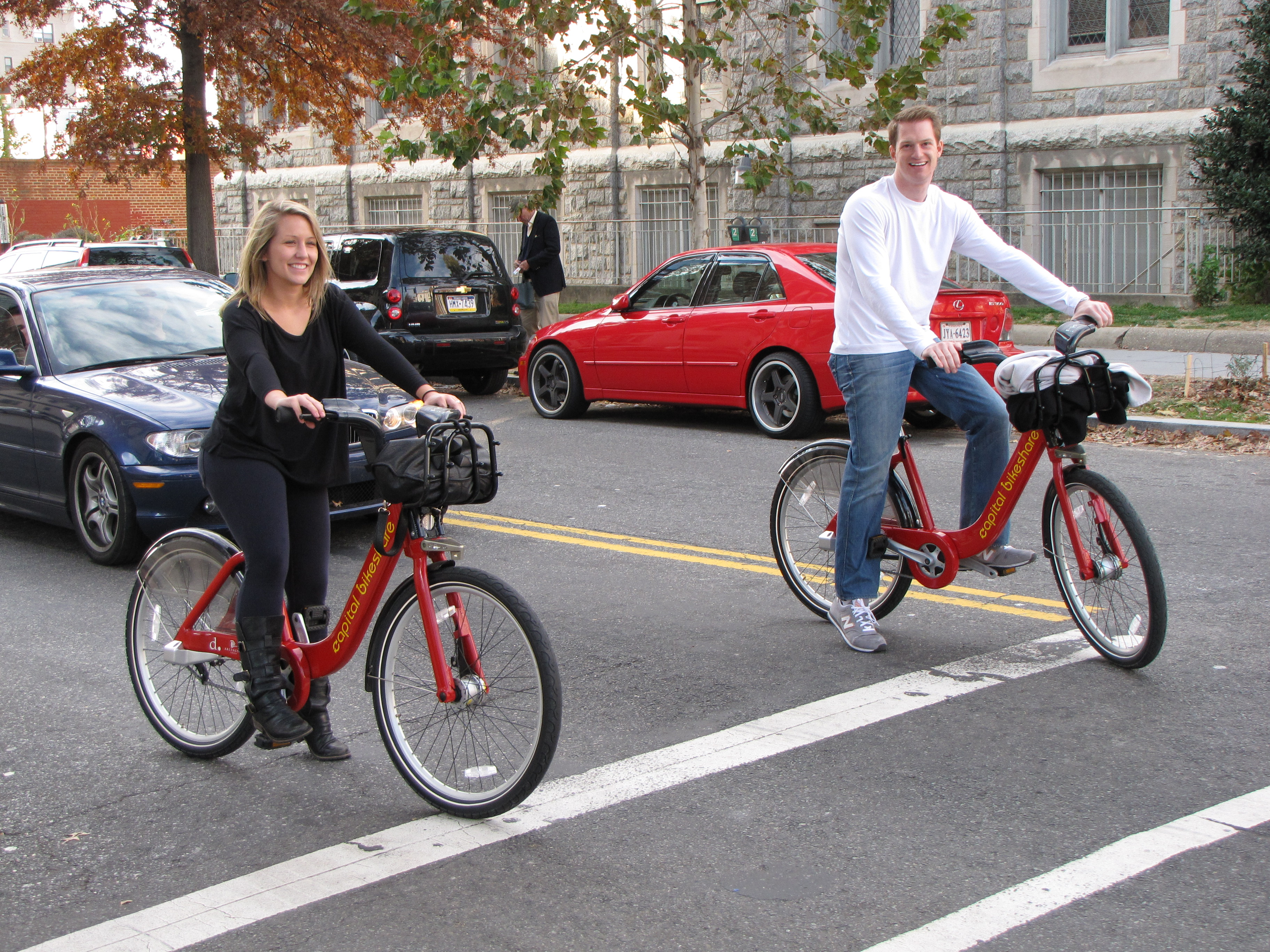
Capital Bikeshare users in the Dupont Circle neighborhood

Capital Bikeshare debuted with a $75 annual membership which allowed unlimited 30 minute rides. Rides longer than 30 minutes were charged escalating fees to discourage longer rides and keep the bikes in circulation for other users. Members paid slightly lower fees. Some members on longer rides stop at a station to dock and then unlock a bike to avoid extra charges as there is no waiting period to unlock another bike. In 2015, annual membership went up by $10.

In response to WMATA's SafeTrack in 2016 and in line with broader industry trends, a $2 single trip fare was offered for rides up to 30 minutes.

In October 2021, the seven-member jurisdictions which own Capital Bikeshare made the largest adjustment to pricing since the system began operation. Members pay now $95 per year and receive 45 minutes of free ride time per trip, paying $0.05 per minute after 45 minutes. Members pay $0.10 minute for each e-bike ride to help offset its higher operating cost. Non-members pay $1 to unlock a bicycle and $0.05 per minute. For a single trip, non-members pay $1 to unlock an e-bike and $0.15 per minute. Both members and non-members pay $2 to leave an e-bike outside of a dock, within the e-bike service area.

On August 1, 2025, the annual membership cost was raised to $120 per year and member e-bike pricing increased to $0.15 per minute. Non-members pay $1 to unlock a bike and $0.15 per minute for a classic bike, $0.35 for an e-bike and $1 more to leave an e-bike outside of a station.

== See also ==
- Baltimore Bike Share
- Nice Ride Minnesota
- SmartBike DC
- Transportation in Washington, D.C.
- Vélo'v
