= Actionfigure =

American software company

Actionfigure, Inc.
- Industry: Information Services; Transportation Demand Management; Mobility Information; Real Estate Technology
- Founders: Matt Caywood; Ryan Croft
- Headquarters: 750 17th St NW, Suite 800, Washington, DC 20006, United States
- Website: actionfigure.ai

Actionfigure, originally known as TransitScreen, is an American technology company that offers software for transportation information and transportation planning. Their initial product TransitScreen (now Actionfigure Screen) is a digital display showing real-time transportation arrival data and other local information. In 2018, they launched a mobile application offering real-time transportation data, and in 2020 launched a product for employers to help employees navigate their commutes. As of 2018, Actionfigure has displays in more than 1,000 buildings in 30 cities, including Washington, Boston, and Pittsburgh.

Actionfigure is a SaaS platform, in which the property or business pays to access its software on a monthly or annual basis.

== History ==
The company grew out of Arlington County's Mobility Lab, which measures the impacts of transportation demand management services. In January 2015, the company closed its first round of seed funding of $600,000, which came from a number of investors, such as 1776 Ventures and Middle Bridge Partners. In late 2015, an additional $800,000 of seed money was raised In April 2018, a new round of funding was announced and was closed in May 2019 from Vancouver-based TIMIA Capital. Shortly thereafter, the company announced that its product is available in South America and Western Europe.

In August 2019, Actionfigure and New York-based commercial real estate digital media amenity company Captivate announced a partnership that will bring Actionfigure's real-time data to Captivate's network of multipurpose display screens.

In August 2020, Actionfigure released Insights, which provides employers with tools for employee onboarding and employees navigating new or hybrid workplace schedules. Insights creates customized trip planning by assessing all local transit routes, multimodal trips, and fares, while integrating with commuter benefits programs.

In November 2021, TransitScreen rebranded to Actionfigure, bringing its suite of software solutions under a unified identity.

== Products ==
Actionfigure's displays show real-time arrival information for trains, subways, buses, streetcars, and ferries. They also show real-time availability of local bicycle-sharing systems, carsharing, and vehicle for hire companies. The displays are made to correspond to the specific address where the individual screen is located.

In September 2017, they released its MobilityScore rating, which uses historical data to determine how easy it is to get around a given location without a car. It is similar to Walk Score, but measures the mobility and transit accessibility of an address rather than proximity to amenities.

In November 2018, they released a mobile application, Actionfigure Mobile (originally CityMotion). Actionfigure Mobile is location-based and shows the user the real-time availability of mobility options nearby. Like Actionfigure Screen, it is a B2B product and is not currently available for individual consumers.
