= Plug-in electric vehicles in Washington =

Plug-in electric vehicles in Washington may refer to:

- Plug-in electric vehicles in Washington (state)
- Plug-in electric vehicles in Washington, D.C.
