= Climate change in Maryland =

Climate change in the US state of Maryland

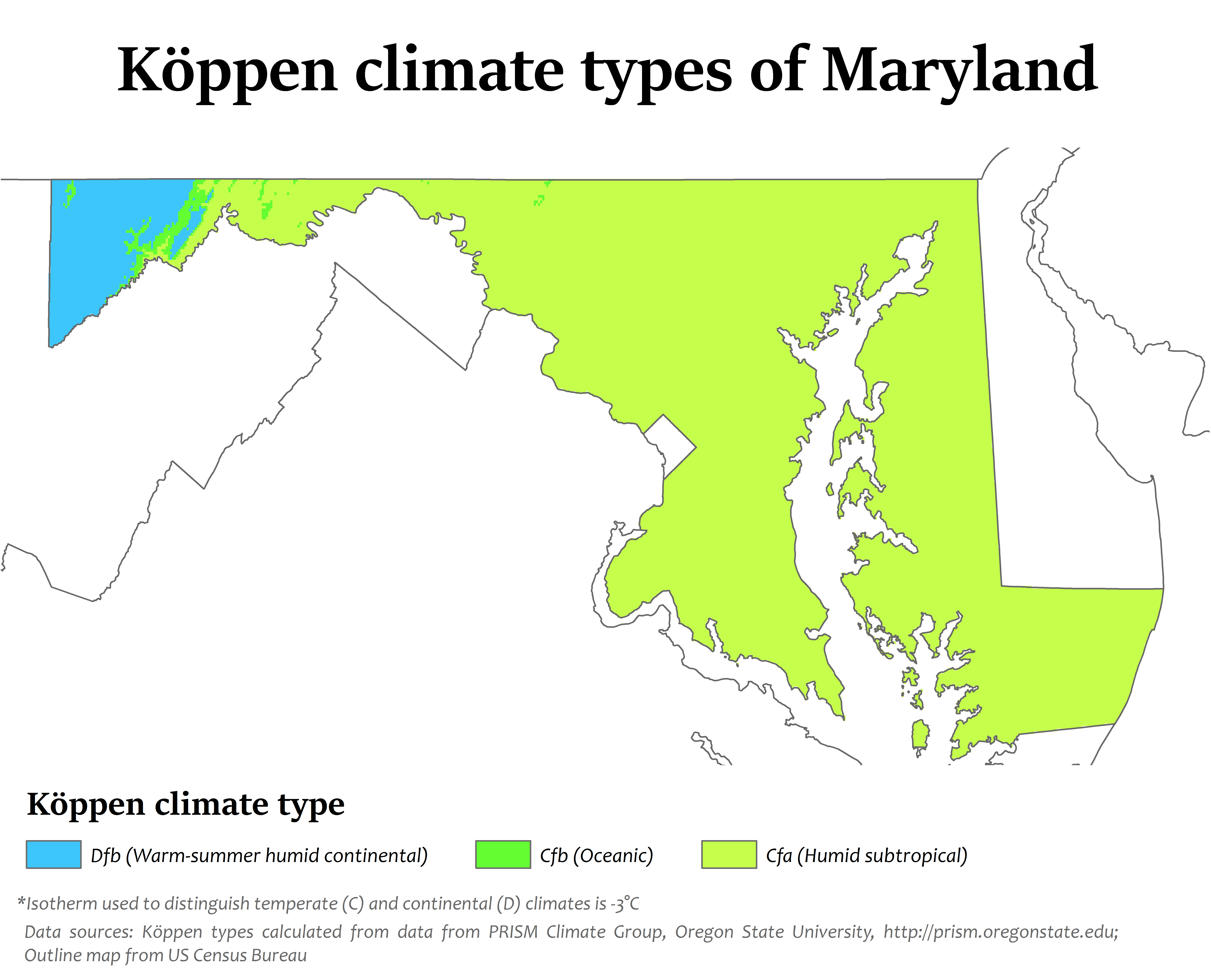
Köppen climate types in Maryland, showing that most of the state is now humid subtropical.

Climate change in Maryland encompasses the effects of climate change, attributed to man-made increases in atmospheric carbon dioxide, in the U.S. state of Maryland.

The United States Environmental Protection Agency reports that the state's climate has warmed one to two degrees Fahrenheit in the last century, heavy rainstorms occurred more often, and sea level rose eroding beaches, submerging low lands, and increasing the salinity of estuaries and aquifers. The changing climate will increase flooding, harm ecosystems, disrupt both agriculture and aquaculture, and increase certain risks to human health.

== Effects of climate change in Maryland ==
=== Temperature ===
The Maryland Department of the Environment has observed that temperatures in Maryland have "generally remained above the 1901–1960 average over the last 30 years, with warming more pronounced during the winter and spring seasons and statistically significant warming trends for each season". "Temperatures in Maryland have risen about 2.5 °F (1.4 °C) since the beginning of the 20th century and temperatures in this century have been warmer than in any other period".

Climate models enable scientists to use mathematics and physics to create a virtual replica of Earth's climate. They also assist with making predictions about how future weather and climate events may be impacted by the greenhouse gasses in our atmosphere. According to a climate model created by the Maryland Commission on Climate Change under a scenario of low fossil fuel emissions, Maryland would experience an increase of 4.8 °F (2.7 °C) in summers and 4 °F (2.2 °C) in winter, while higher emissions would lead to warming of nearly 9 °F (5.0 °C) in summer and 7 °F (3.9 °C) in winter. West Maryland would experience greater summertime warming while areas on the lower Eastern Shore would experience less because of the moderating influence of the ocean. NASA projects that, by mid-century, Maryland will experience more than 60 additional days per year above 90 °F (32 °C) compared to the end of last century under continued increases in emissions.

Climate models project an increase in annual droughts, from about 15 days on average at present to 17 days for the higher emissions scenario and a smaller increase under the lower emissions scenario. Furthermore, a month-long drought can be expected to occur every 40 years and may increase to every 8 years in 2100 under the higher emissions scenario. At the same time, average annual precipitation is projected to increase over the next century, particularly during winter and spring, potentially making flooding events in urban areas more frequent and expanding flood hazard areas. "Rising temperatures will melt snow earlier in spring and increase evaporation, and thereby dry the soil during summer and fall. As a result, changing the climate is likely to intensify flooding during winter and spring, and drought during summer and fall".

=== Sea levels ===
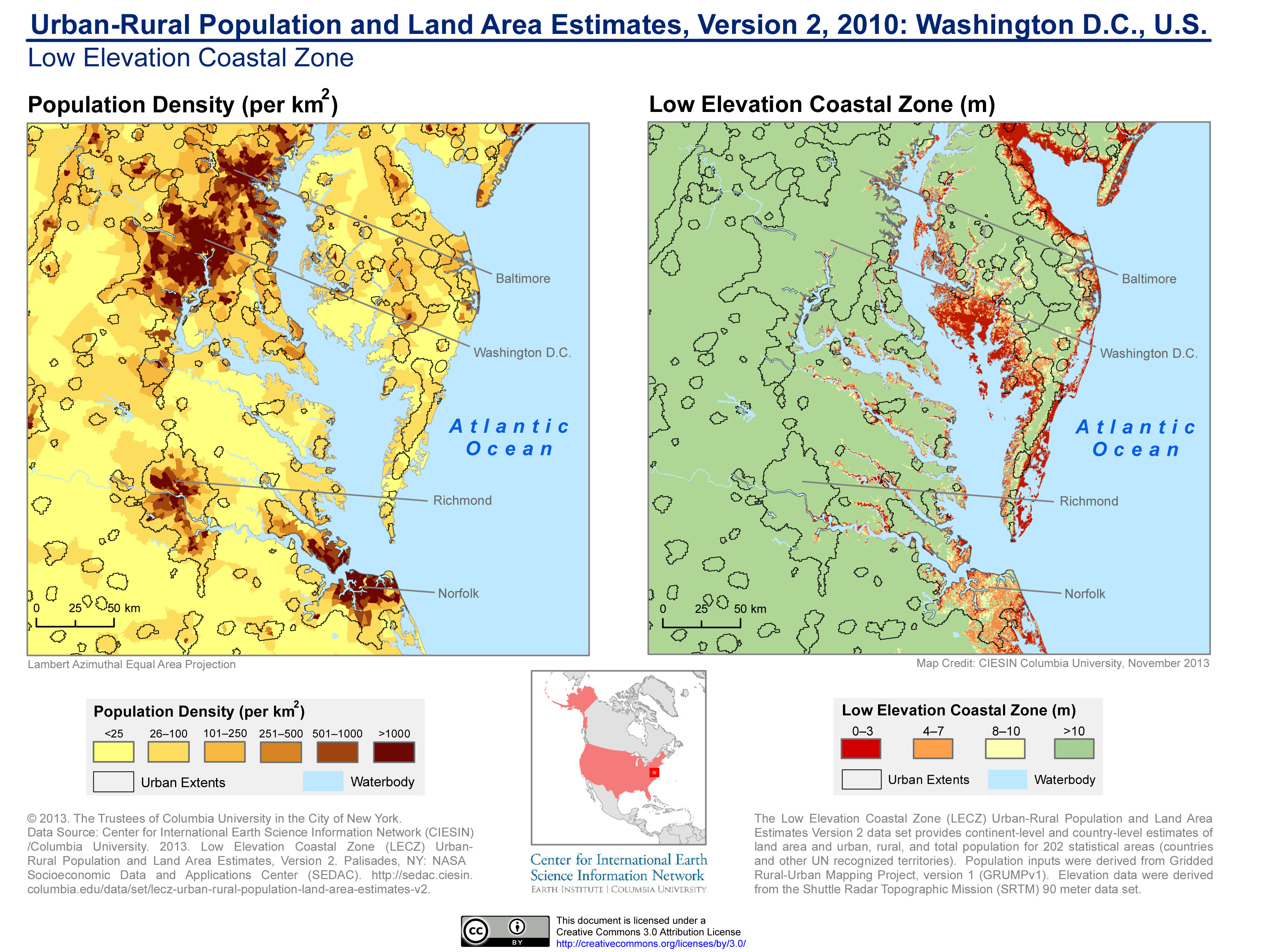
Population density and elevation above sea level around the Chesapeake Bay.

More frequent tidal flooding results from sea level rise caused by climate change. Shown: data for Annapolis.

Sea level in Maryland rose by 1 foot (0.30 m) in the 20th century, partially because the land is sinking as a result of slow adjustments of the Earth after the last ice age. While varying by less than 4 inches over 2,000 years, during the 20th century the ocean began to rise steadily again because of climate change influenced by human activities, causing the warming ocean to expand its volume and glaciers to lose melt waters to the sea. "Sea-level rise is very likely to accelerate, inundating hundreds of square miles of wetlands and land. Projections that include accelerating the melting of ice would increase the relative sea-level along Maryland's shorelines by more than 1 foot by mid-century and 3 feet by late century if greenhouse gas emissions continue to grow". The effects of accelerated sea-level rise are already observable, including shoreline erosion, deterioration of tidal wetlands, and saline contamination of low-lying farm fields. "As sea level rises, the lowest dry lands are submerged and become either tidal wetland or open water. The freshwater wetlands in the upper tidal portions of the Potomac, Patuxent, Choptank, and Nanticoke rivers build their own land by capturing floating sediments, and they are likely to keep pace with the rising sea during the next century."

Coastal wetlands on the Eastern Shore, particularly in Dorchester and Somerset counties including the Blackwater National Wildlife Refuge, have locally increased the rate of relative sea-level rise, contributing to severe wetland loss. Port facilities in Maryland, primarily Baltimore, are also susceptible to increased flooding, with 298 acres (or 32 percent) of the overall port facilities in the state impacted by 2100. Storms and sea level rise also contribute to beach erosion, with occurs 150 times faster than the rate of sea level rise. The United States Geological Survey estimates that Assateague Island is "very likely" to be broken up by new inlets or lost to erosion if sea level rises two feet by the year 2100.

In November 2020, NASA reported that Annapolis had 18 days of high-tide (non-storm-related) flooding from May 2019 to April 2020, an increase over 2018's 12 days, and higher than the 1995–2005 average of 2 days annually. The increase is attributed to sea level rise caused by climate change. Resultant flood damages caused local businesses to lose as much as $172,000 a year. On Naval Academy grounds, seawater came out of storm drains, with McNair Road and Ramsay Road flooding 20 times in 2020 and more than 40 times each in 2018 and 2019. Adaptation approaches such as seawalls and building up the height of roadways and athletic fields are predicted to last only a few decades.

=== Homes and infrastructure ===
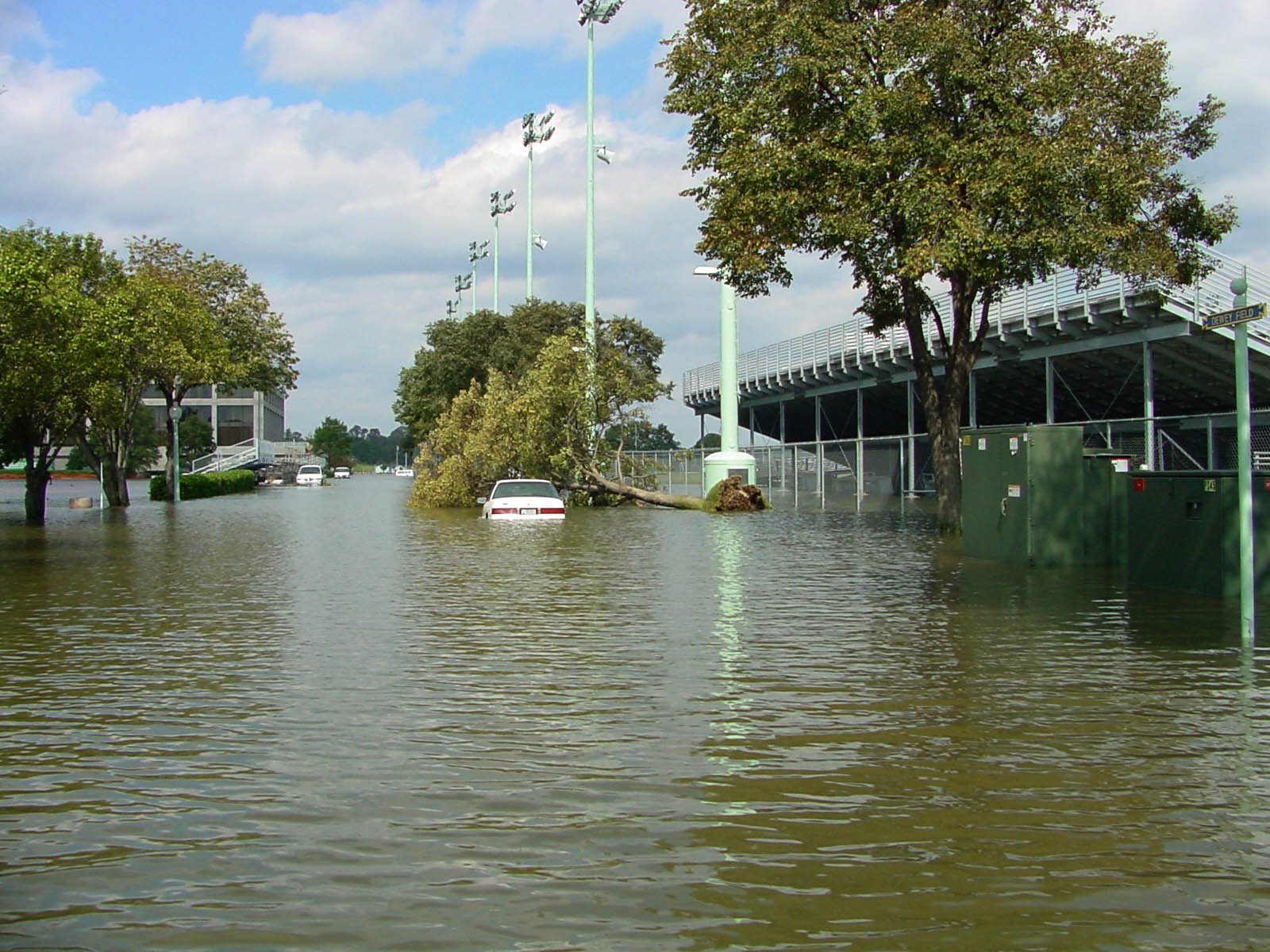
Flooding from Hurricane Isabel, U.S. Naval Academy.

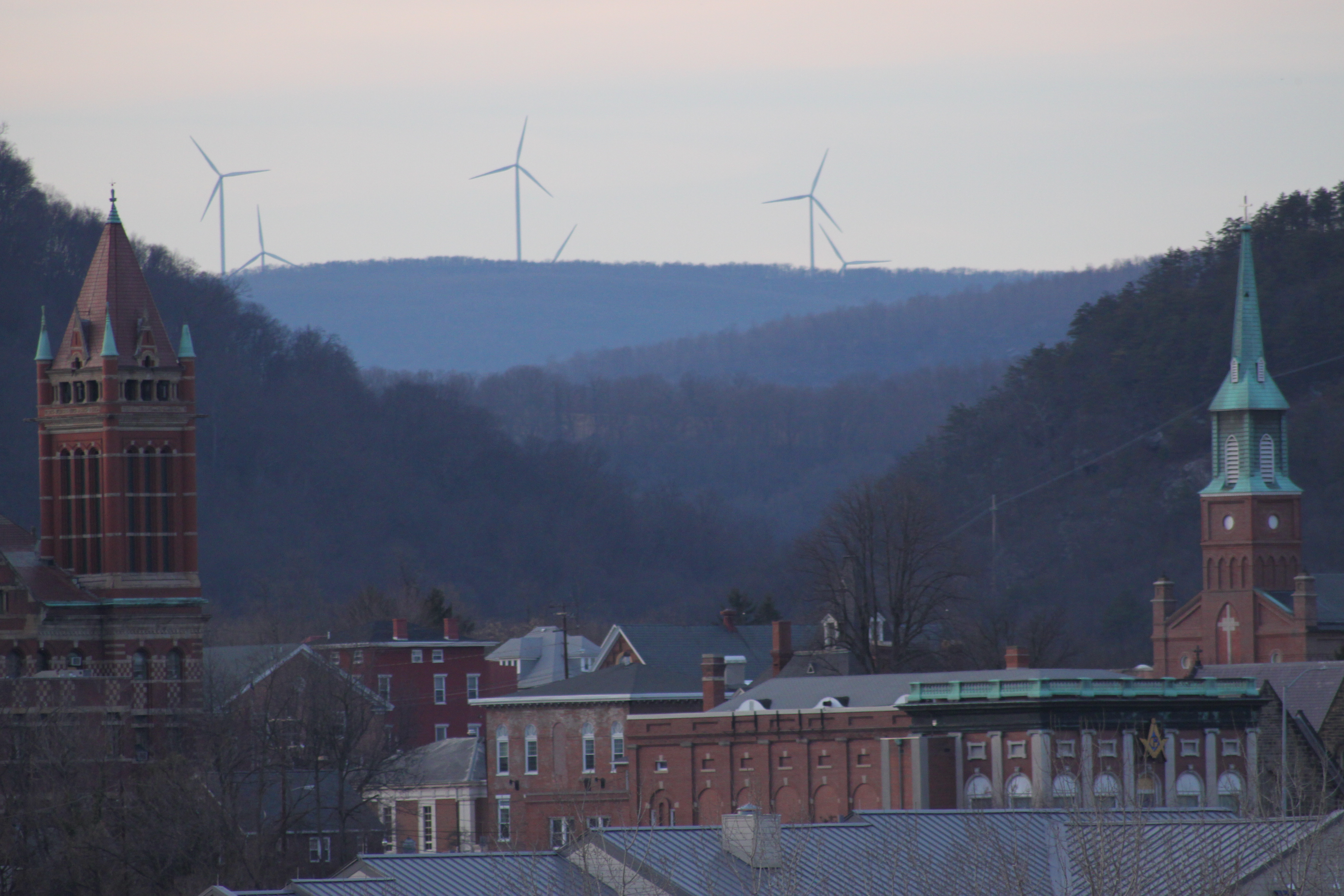
Wind turbines, Cumberland.

In 2003, storm surges from Hurricane Isabel in the Chesapeake Bay flooded downtown Annapolis, North Beach, and several communities on the Eastern Shore, causing more than 1.27 million homes in Maryland to lose power — the worst outage Maryland had ever seen — and about $462 million in damages. A 2008 report from the Maryland Commission on Climate Change found that the destructive potential of Atlantic tropical storms and hurricanes has increased since 1970 in association with warming sea surface temperatures, and that rains and winds from hurricanes were likely to increase as ocean waters warm. On Maryland's Eastern Shore, Ocean City and other developed areas are very susceptible to rising sea levels. As wetlands and barrier islands that protect rural communities from the ocean become more inundated, damage from extreme weather events will increase. The estimated loss of infrastructure and cultural assets from rising sea levels at Assateague Island National Seashore alone, for example, could reach as high as $141.9 million.

"Although hurricanes are rare, their wind speeds and rainfall rates are likely to increase as the climate continues to warm. Rising sea level is likely to increase flood insurance rates, while more frequent storms could increase the deductible for wind damage in homeowner insurance policies". A March 2019 study by the First Street Foundation found that Maryland had already lost over half a billion dollars in property value because of tidal flooding linked to sea level rise.

=== Ecosystems ===
Climate change poses a threat to bird species that depend on high elevation habitats that have been greatly reduced in size, such as the northern saw-whet owl and golden-crowned kinglet. It also impacts birds that reside in coastal marsh habitats during their nesting season, including rails and sparrows, through sea level rise and severe weather events such as storms and tidal surges. "The most vulnerable marshes along Chesapeake Bay are inhabited by great blue heron, bald eagle, American black duck, and snowy egret. The marshes near Ocean City and Assateague Island provide forage for shorebirds, such as sandpipers and plovers, and several species of ducks and geese spend the winter in these marshes". In addition to impacting habitat availability, climate change can directly affect the timing of prey availability through species abundance and distribution. For example, a decrease in horseshoe crab populations has led to a decrease in ruddy turnstones, with interacting effects related to the avian bird flu.

Warming water temperatures could influence the social behaviors of freshwater fish (including activity levels, consumptive demands, growth rates, symbiosis, and the amount of suitable habitat available), where adaptability to these changes is varied among species. Atlantic coast studies have observed that changes in precipitation and stream flow affect species of diadromous fish, such as the American shad, who rely on temperatures for knowing when to move northward for spawning. Increased temperatures, low dissolved oxygen, and low prey availability will decrease growth and reproduction in some species of Coastal and marine fish species, including winter flounder, tautog, Atlantic herring, and spiny dogfish. "If water temperatures exceed 86 °F (30 °C) during summer, eelgrass could be lost. Blue crabs would lose an important hiding place during spring when they are changing shells and vulnerable to predators, and the sea turtles that feed on those crabs in the eelgrass might lose that food source".

"The loss of bay beaches would remove key habitat for diamondback terrapin that nest on these beaches. Other species that depend on bay beaches include horseshoe crabs, tiger beetles, sand fleas, snails, and several crab species. The loss of those species would remove important sources of food for birds".

=== Fishing and farms ===
Climate change is predicted to have direct and impact blue crab population through habitat and ecosystem attributes, demographics, and broad-scale weather effects on recruitment dynamics. Female crabs may mature and mate earlier in response to climate change, but crabs' small size at maturity increases their vulnerability to predators and decreases the number of offspring produced per brood. Warming temperatures will lead to warmer winters and longer warm seasons, which could lead to a year-round crab season by the year 2100. Furthermore, this may result in more broods over the annual cycle, but would increase cannibalism between juvenile crabs. "Blue crabs and other shellfish are vulnerable to increased acidity in the water, especially during early life stages when acidity impairs their ability to build shells. As sea level rises, the Chesapeake Bay region is expected to lose some of the wetlands that fish and shellfish depend on for nursery grounds. Warmer waters are expected to increase harmful algae, lower oxygen levels, and change the mix of species that thrive in the bay".

Extreme weather events, including flooding, pests and disease, and ozone levels, are likely to intensify or become less predictable with climate change, likely resulting in increased costs to both farmers and consumers. "Climate change may also pose challenges for agriculture: some farms may be harmed if more hot days and droughts reduce crop yields, or if more flooding and wetter springs delay their planting dates. Other farms may benefit from a longer growing season and the fertilizing effect of carbon dioxide". Plants that have an optimum range at cooler temperatures will experience significant decreases in yield as temperatures increase from climate change. Corn and wheat would experience an 8-14 percent decrease in crop yields from an increase of 2–3 °F (1.1–1.7 °C) by 2040-2050, while soybeans would see little change in yield. In 2011, the Maryland Department of Agriculture received federal disaster assistance for droughts, extreme heat, and hurricanes which led to market losses of at least 30 percent in some parts of the state.

== State policy ==
=== O'Malley administration (2007–2015) ===
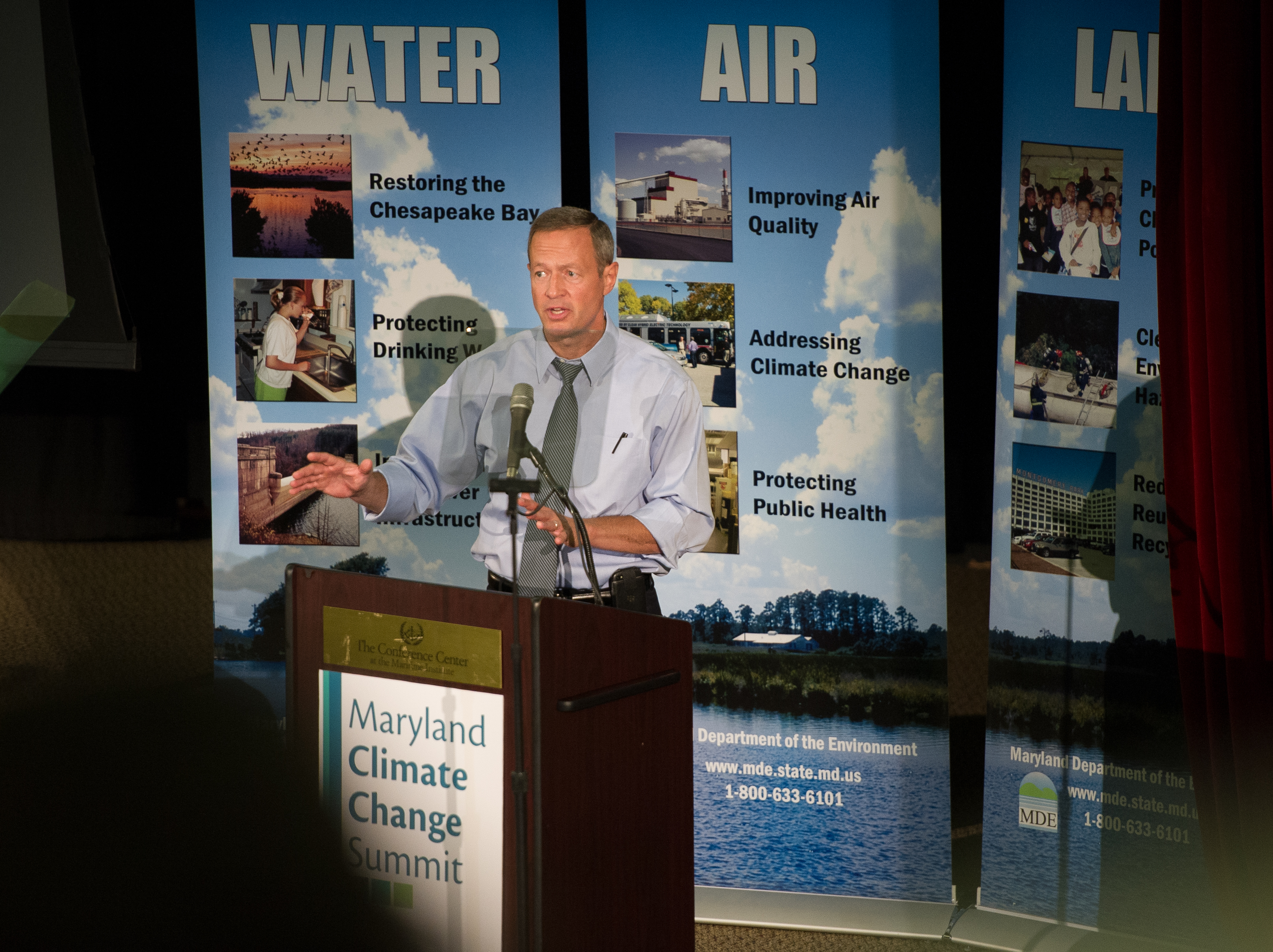
Governor O'Malley speaks at the Maryland Climate Change Summit, 2013.

During the 2007 legislative session, lawmakers introduced and passed the Clean Cars Act, which requires Maryland to adopt the tougher emissions standards imposed by California. The bill was signed into law by Governor Martin O'Malley on April 25, 2007.

During the 2008 legislative session, O'Malley introduced five energy bills to climate change, including a plan for reducing statewide energy use by 15 percent by 2015 and a doubling the state's renewable power, such as wind and solar, by 2022.

In December 2012, O'Malley signed an executive order directing all new and rebuilt state structures to be elevated two or more feet above the state's 100-year base flood level to avoid or minimize future flood damage.

During the 2013 legislative session, O'Malley introduced legislation that would require Maryland taxpayers to pay a rate of $1.50 a month on their electric bills to fund the construction of a proposed 200 megawatt wind farm off the coast of Ocean City, Maryland. The bill passed the Senate with a 30–15 vote and House of Delegates with a 88–48 vote, and was signed into law on April 9, 2013.

In July 2013, the O'Malley administration released a proposal to boost the state's renewable energy portfolio by requiring utilities to make renewables 25 percent of their energy generation by 2020. As proposed, the plan would have been the most aggressive plan against climate change in the United States.

During the 2014 legislative session, lawmakers introduced legislation to delay the Great Bay Wind Energy Center, a proposed wind farm in Somerset County, because of its proximity to the Patuxent River Naval Air Station. The bill passed the House of Delegates with a 112–22 vote and the Senate with a 31–16 vote. O'Malley vetoed the legislation, saying that it would send "a chilling message" to the clean-energy industry if it became law.

In November 2014, O'Malley proposed legislation to allow hydraulic fracking in western Maryland, but required energy companies to adhere to public health and environmental regulations to limit the risks of drinking-water contamination and air pollution. Governor-elect Larry Hogan criticized O'Malley for taking action on a number of controversial issues, including fracking, "on the way out the door".

=== Hogan administration (2015–2023) ===
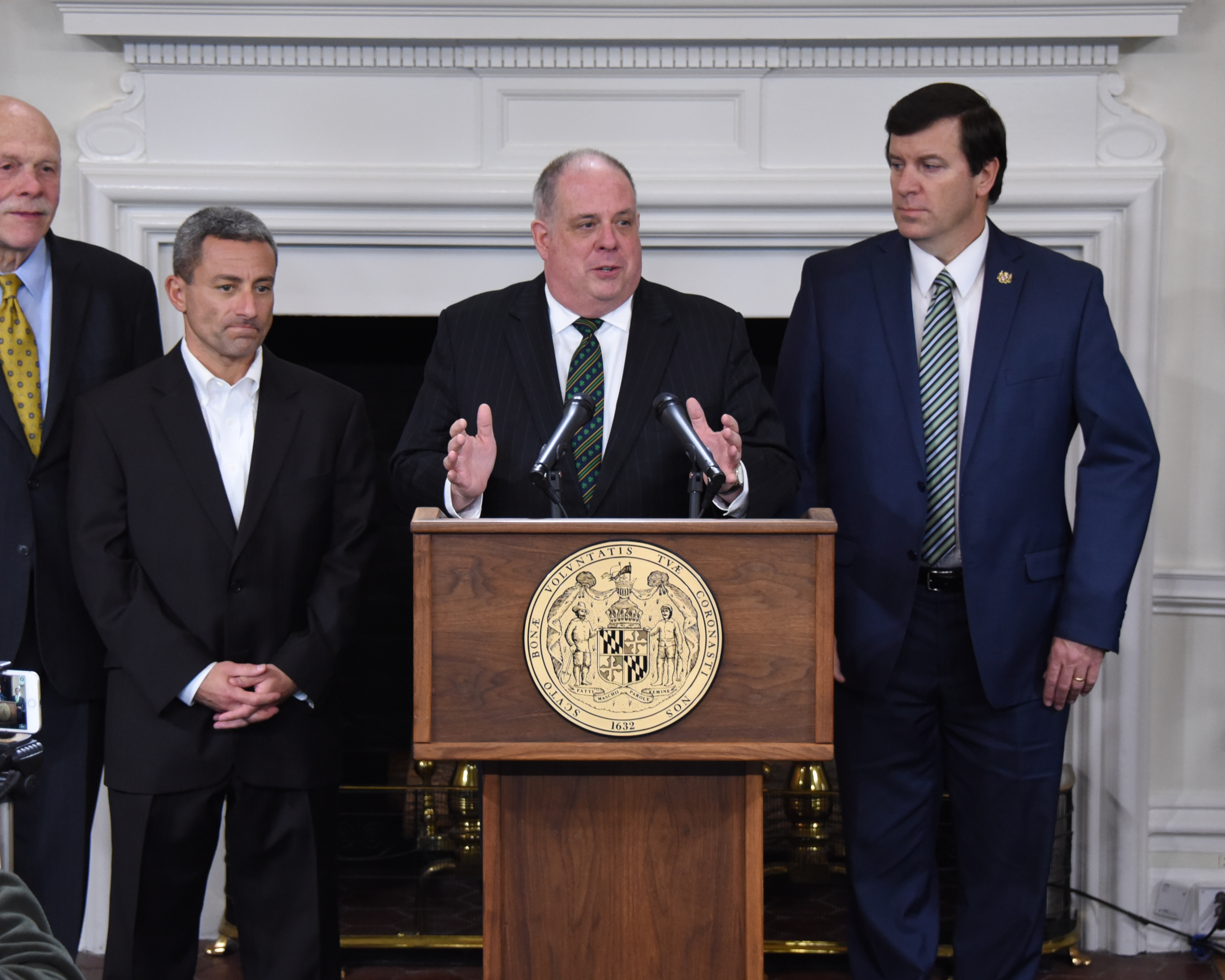
Governor Hogan announces his support for a ban on fracking, 2017.

As a candidate, Hogan called fracking opportunities in western Maryland "an economic gold mine" and faulted the state for taking too long to decide whether to allow drilling for oil. During the 2015 legislative session, lawmakers introduced legislation to impose a two-and-a-half year moratorium on hydraulic fracking in Maryland. Hogan allowed the bill to become law without his signature. During the 2017 legislative session, Hogan called for a ban on hydraulic fracking, moving legislators to pass a bill to ban fracking with a vote of 97–40 in the House of Delegates and 35–10 in the Senate. Hogan signed the bill into law on April 4, 2017, making Maryland the second state to ban fracking.

In November 2019, Hogan joined the United States Climate Alliance after speaking out against the United States withdrawal from the Paris Agreement. In December 2019, Maryland joined consideration for the Transportation Climate Initiative (TCI), a multi-state gasoline cap-and-trade program that aimed to reduce transportation-related tailpipe emissions, and would levy a tax on fuel companies based on carbon dioxide emissions. The most ambitious version of the plan was projected to reduce the area's tailpipe emissions by 25% between 2022 and 2032. At the time, the program was in the public comment phase, with individual states determining whether to participate. In December 2020, the Hogan administration declined to join the TCI, despite taking part in the initial planning for the regional alliance.

During the 2022 legislative session, state Senator Paul G. Pinsky introduced the Climate Solutions Now Act, an omnibus bill to reduce greenhouse gas emissions by 60 percent by 2030, require large state-owned buildings to cut emissions to net zero by 2035 and privately owned buildings of the same size to achieve net zero by 2040, electrify the state's light-duty vehicle fleet, require new buildings to use electric power, and set a cap on methane emissions from landfills. During committee deliberations, the bill was amended to weaken or cut the bill's most far-reaching provisions. Governor Hogan threatened to veto the bill, calling the climate bill a "reckless and controversial energy tax", even though the bill contained no tax increases. The bill passed both chambers of the Maryland General Assembly and became law without Governor Hogan's signature.

=== Moore administration (2023–present) ===
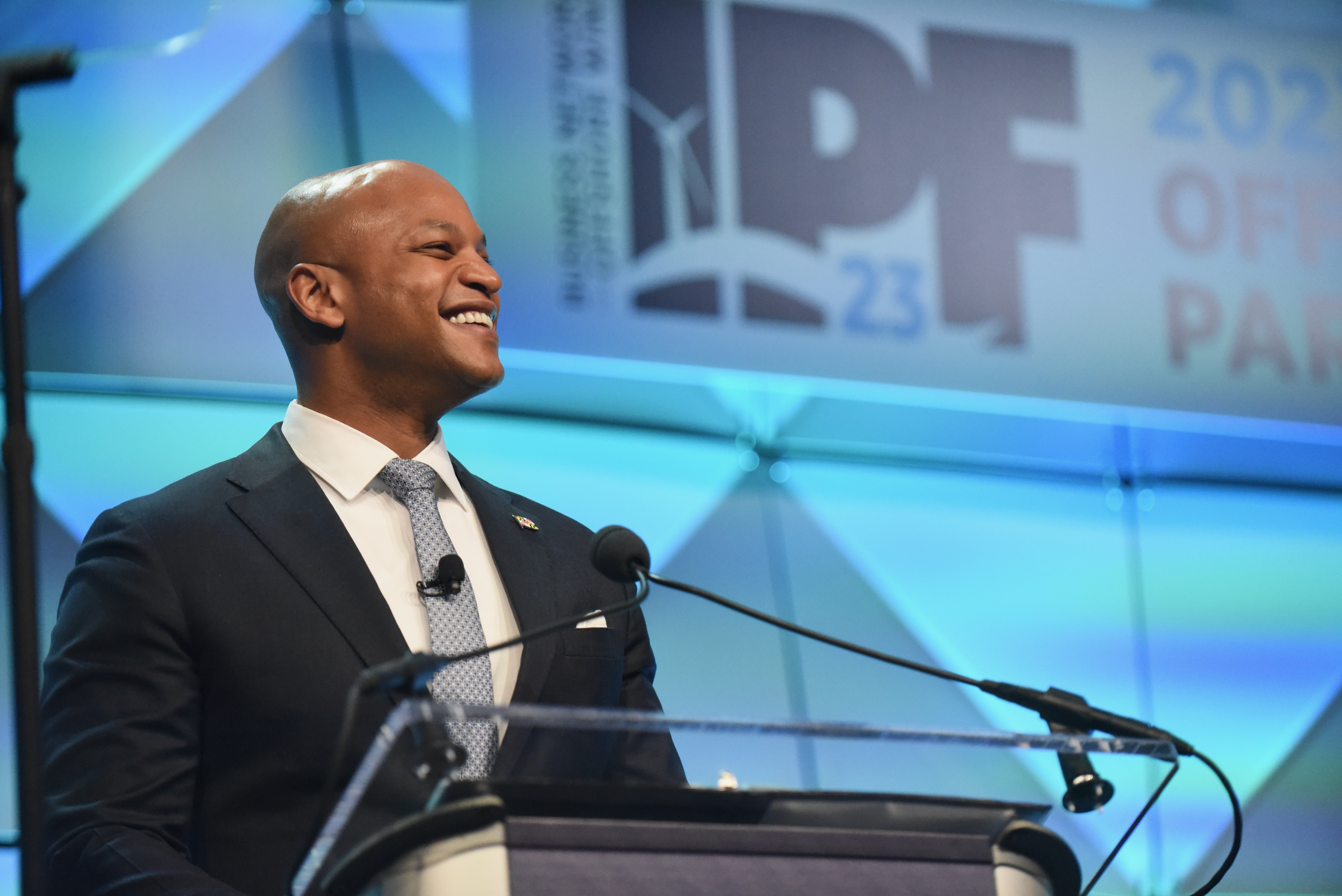
Governor Moore speaks at the International Offshore Wind Partnering Forum, 2023.

As a candidate, Wes Moore said he supported the energy goals set by the state's Clean Energy Jobs Act of 2019, which called for a 50 percent reduction in greenhouse gas emissions and an electrification of the state's vehicle fleet by 2030, and said the state should pursue "more ambitious goals" beyond carbon neutrality. He also proposed regulations to achieve 100% clean energy use by 2035 and net zero carbon emissions by 2045, electrify the state's fleet, and prioritize environmental-justice funding. In March 2023, Moore set a goal of achieving 8.5 gigawatts of wind power generation in the state by 2031.

In February 2023, Moore introduced the Clean Transportation and Energy Act, which increases incentives for people and businesses looking to purchase electric trucks and charging stations. In March 2023, Moore said he supported adopting California's Advanced Clean Cars II (ACC II) regulation, which would phase out the sale of gas-powered cars in the state by 2035. In April 2025, as Maryland electric vehicle sales continued to lag behind the state's goals, Moore signed an executive order to delay fines against car companies that fail to comply with the state's electric vehicle mandates.

In December 2023, the Maryland Department of the Environment unveiled a plan to reduce Maryland's greenhouse gases by 60 percent under the Climate Solutions Now Act, which includes rebates for purchasing electric vehicles while reducing car mileage per capita, removing waste incinerators from the state's renewable energy portfolio, installing electric heat pumps at individual homes, and requiring all electricity used in Maryland to be generated using renewable sources by 2035. In June 2024, Moore issued an executive order requiring that Maryland state agencies detail, by November 1, 2024, how they will address the climate crisis and cut greenhouse gas emissions by 60 percent by 2031, compared with 2006 levels.

In January 2026, researchers from the University of Maryland's Center for Global Sustainability released a new report finding that Maryland was further behind than expected, with the state having reduced greenhouse gas emissions 42% by 2031 compared to 2006 levels instead of the 60% goal set by the Climate solutions Now Act. The report cited increased data center demand as a result of the AI boom as well as the second Trump administration's environmental and energy policies, specifically toward electric vehicles, for the setback.

== See also ==
- Chesapeake Climate Action Network
- Plug-in electric vehicles in Maryland
