= Transportation in Washington, D.C. =

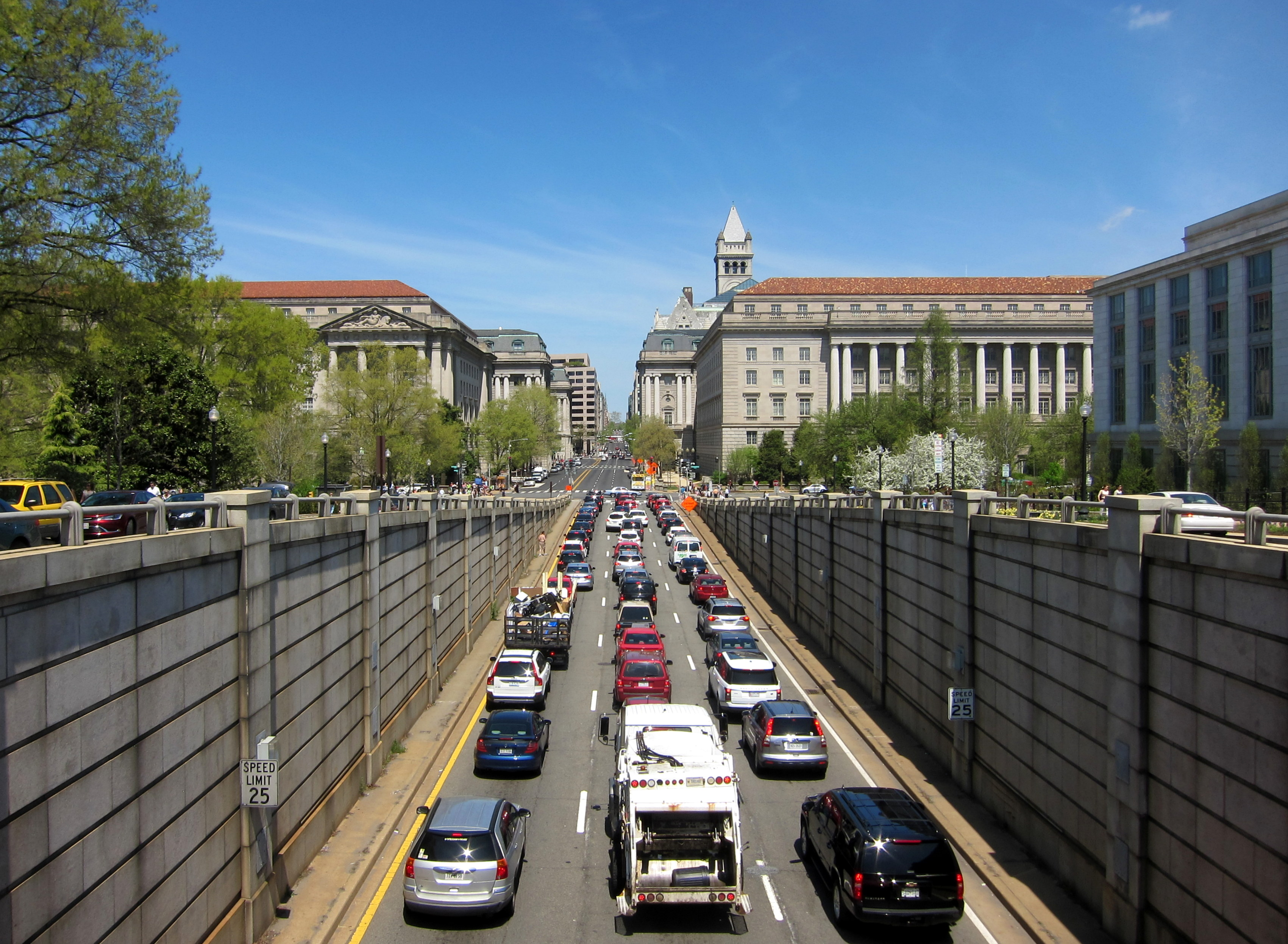
Traffic congestion on the north end of the 12th street tunnel in Downtown Washington, D.C.

Washington, D.C. has a number of different modes of transportation available for use. Commuters have a major influence on travel patterns, with only 28% of people employed in Washington, D.C. commuting from within the city, whereas 33.5% commute from the nearby Maryland suburbs, 22.7% from Northern Virginia, and the rest from Washington, D.C.'s outlying suburbs.

== Commuting ==
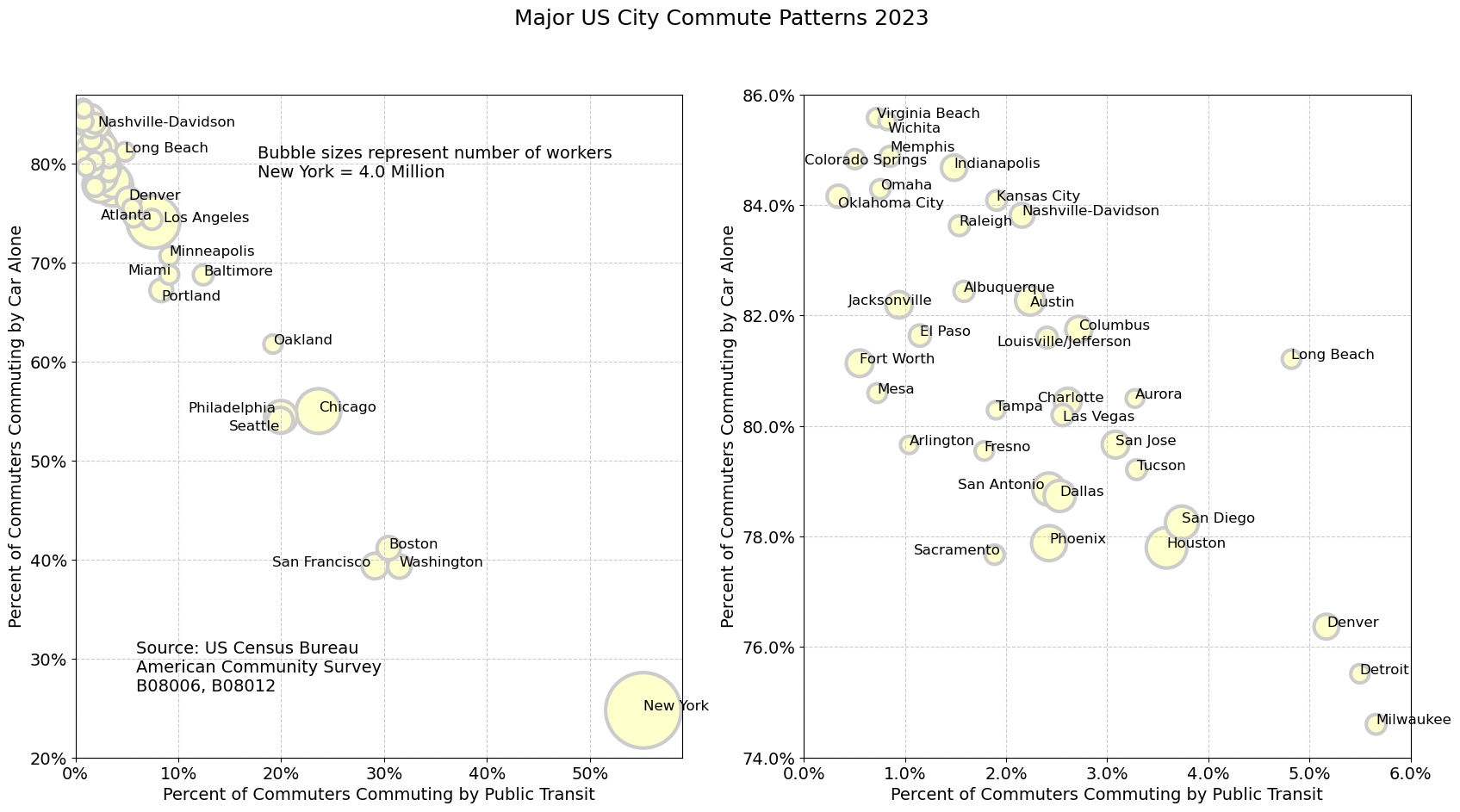
Commuting statistics for major U.S. cities in 2008

Washington, D.C., has the second-highest percentage of public transit commuters in the United States, behind only New York City.

Commuters have a major influence on travel patterns in Washington, D.C. 671,678 people are employed in Washington, D.C., with only 28% commuting from within the city. 18.7% of people working in Washington, D.C., commute from Prince George's County, Maryland, and 14.8% from Montgomery County, Maryland. 13.2% come from Fairfax County, Virginia, 6% from Arlington County, Virginia, and 3.5% from Alexandria, Virginia. Smaller numbers of commuters come from the outer suburbs, including 2.4% from Anne Arundel County, Maryland, and 2.3% from Prince William County, Virginia, 1.6% from Charles County, Maryland, 1.3% from Howard County, Maryland, and 1% from Loudoun County, Virginia. Of the 260,000 Washington, D.C. residents that were employed as of 2000, 24% commute to jobs in Montgomery, Prince George's, Fairfax, and Arlington Counties, as well as Alexandria. Of those that work in Washington, D.C., 29% drive alone to work, 27% work from home, 14% take Metro, 11% walk to work, 8% take the bus, 4% carpool/slug, 3% ride their bicycle to work, and 1% travel by rail. Of the households in Washington, D.C., 36% do not own a car.

=== Public transportation statistics ===
The average amount of time people spend commuting with public transit in Washington, for example, to and from work, on a weekday is 86 min. 31% of public transit riders ride for more than 2 hours every day. The average amount of time people wait at a stop or station for public transit is 19 min, while 34% of riders wait for over 20 minutes on average every day. The average distance people usually ride in a single trip with public transit is 8.8 km (5.5 mi), while 20% travel for over 12 km (7.5 mi) in a single direction.

== Streets and highways ==
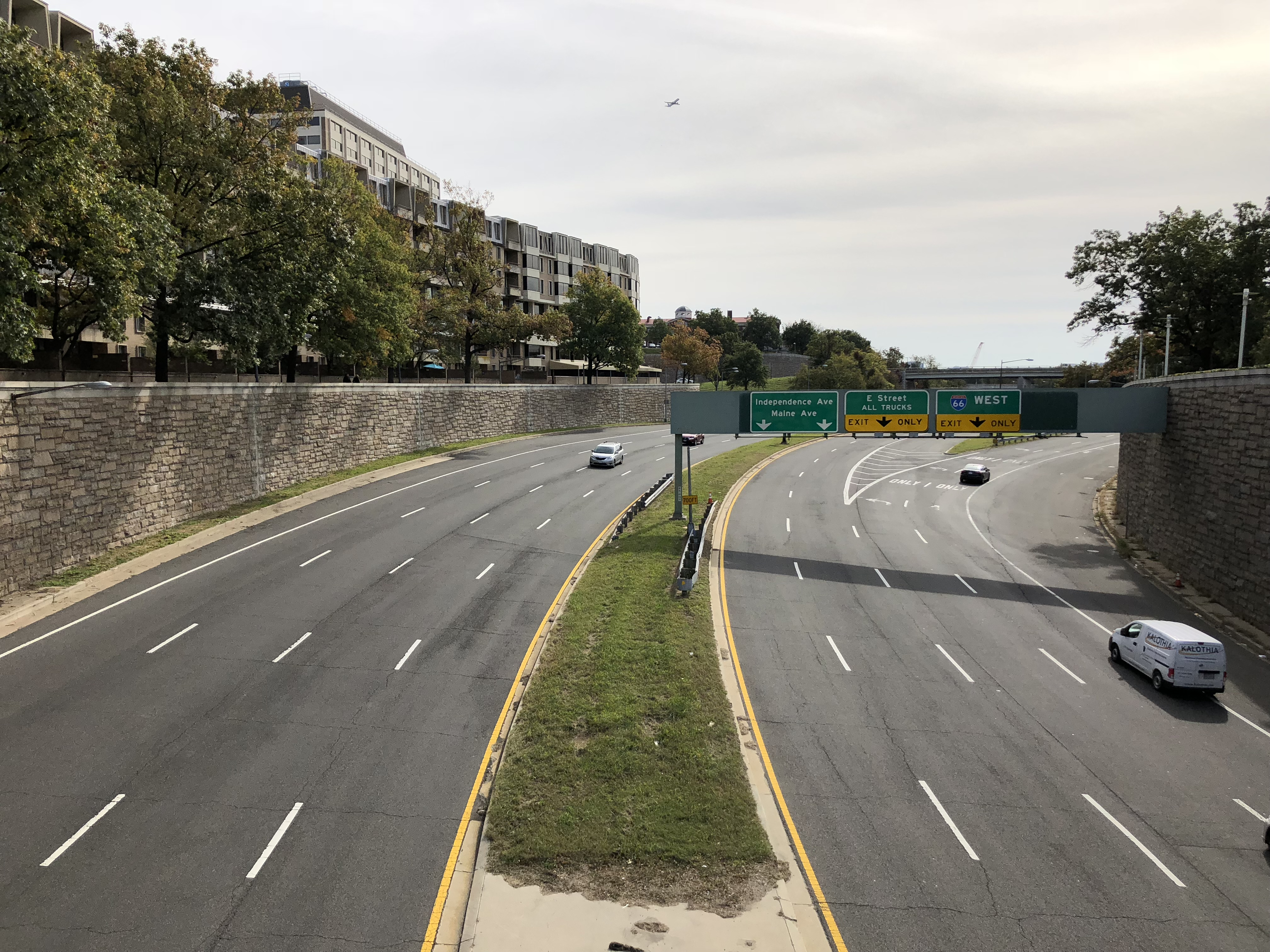
I-66 in Washington, D.C.

City streets in the District of Columbia are organized primarily in a grid-like fashion with its origin at the United States Capitol, with diagonal streets running across this grid, as well as circles—a plan laid out by Pierre L'Enfant and revised by Andrew Ellicott and Joseph Ellicott. The north-south roads are primarily named with numbers (i.e., 1st Street, 2nd Street, etc.), while the east-west roads are primarily named with letters (beginning with A Street) or, once letters are exhausted, are named alphabetically (Adams, Bryant, Channing, etc.) Intersecting this network of streets are diagonal avenues named after each of the fifty states. Within this grid, all streets are a part of one of the four quadrants of the city—Northeast (NE), Northwest (NW), Southeast (SE), and Southwest (SW)—all centered on the Capitol Building. All roads end with this suffix at the end of their title. For example, there is a 4th Street NE, 4th Street NW, 4th Street SE, and 4th Street SW.

Exceptions to this nomenclature include the names of the streets that line the National Mall. The north side of the mall is lined by Constitution Avenue, whereas the south side of the mall is lined by Independence Avenue. Both streets follow the NE, NW, SE, SW rule.

Major interstates running through the area include the Capital Beltway (I-495), I-66, I-95, I-395 (also called the Southwest/Southeast Freeway in D.C. or Shirley Highway in Virginia), I-295 (also called the Anacostia Freeway or Kenilworth Avenue), and I-270 (which does not reach D.C., terminating at I-495). Other major highways include the Whitehurst Freeway, in D.C., the George Washington Parkway in Virginia, the Rock Creek Parkway in D.C., the Suitland Parkway in D.C. and Maryland, US Route 50, the Clara Barton Parkway and the Baltimore-Washington Parkway in Maryland, and the Dulles Toll Road in Virginia. Portions of I-66 and I-95/I-395 in Virginia are HOV roads (only vehicles carrying multi-occupants or using hybrid energy are allowed during weekday rush hours).

== Cars ==
=== Taxi ===
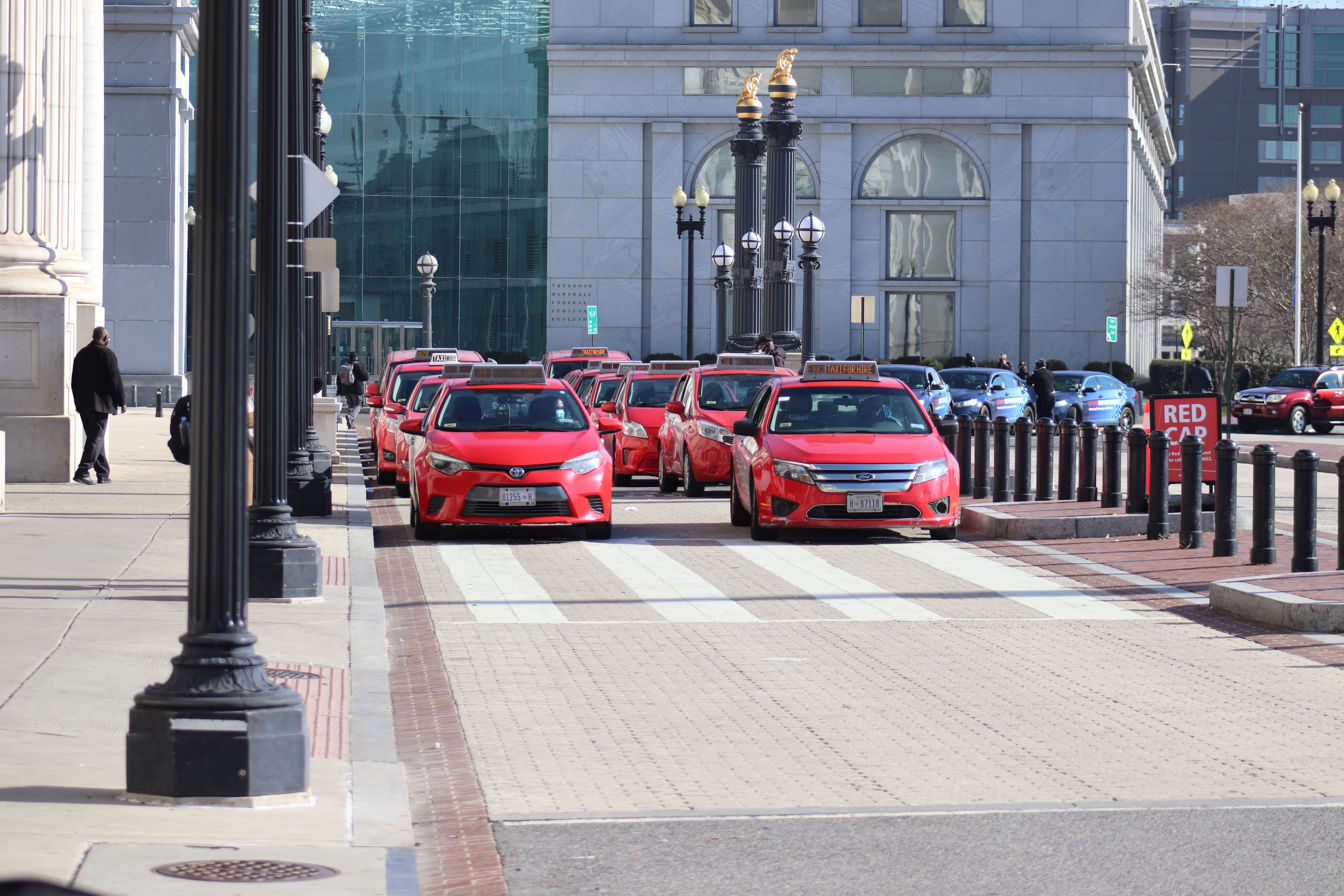
Taxis in front of Union Station.

As of 2015, Washington had over 6,200 registered taxis, making it the third-largest concentration of taxis in the United States, after New York City and Chicago. Regardless of company operating the taxi service, all taxis operating in the city share a uniform design, as mandated by the DC Taxicab Commission. The vehicles are red with a gray stripe along the side doors.

=== Car sharing ===
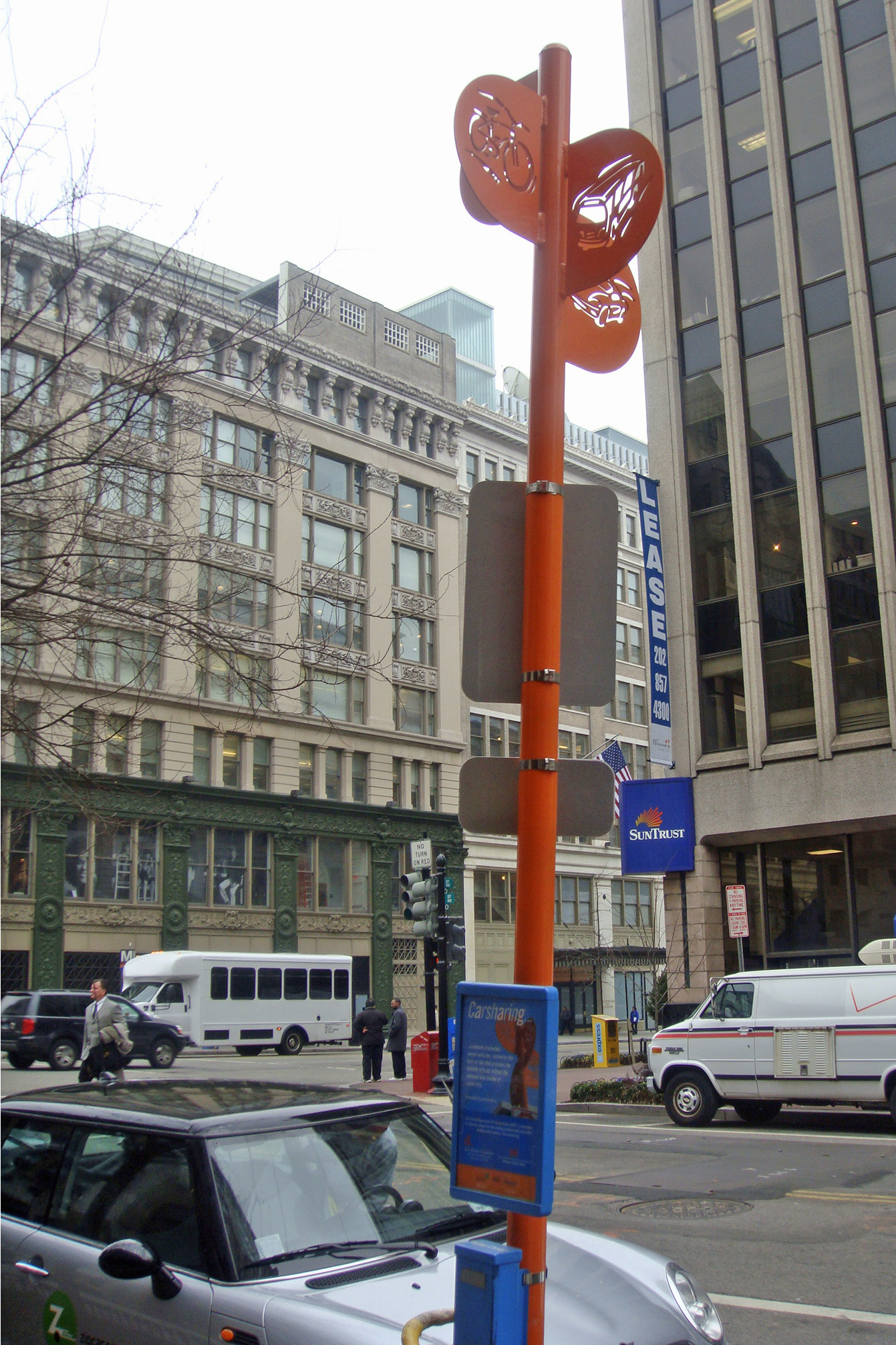
Zipcar on-street drop/pick up area at downtown Washington, D.C.

In December 2001, Metro initiated a relationship with Flexcar, a private company which operates car sharing networks in several North American cities. A competitor, Zipcar, began service in the region and later merged with Flexcar on October 31, 2007. With this service, cars are parked at major Metrorail stations and other convenient locations in the metropolitan area and made available for rental on an hourly basis, with the goal of reducing car dependency and congestion, improving the environment, and increasing transit ridership.

In March 2012, Car2Go began offering service in D.C., initially providing 200 Smart cars for use everywhere within the District's city limits. The international car sharing company, which offers one-way rentals charged by the minute, increased their vehicle fleet to 400 in 2013. During its first year of operation, Car2Go paid the city more than $500,000 for rights to meter-free parking. The service has seen initial success; from September 2012 to July 2013, membership tripled to 26,000 users.

=== Parking ===
There is heavy vehicle congestion from the large percentage of the population who chooses to drive. This results in very limited parking, especially in the downtown areas of the city. Corporations have made various attempts to solve the city's parking problem as a guinea pig location, but there has been little success. Parking restrictions are strictly enforced, and the complicated parking hours posted on signs can be confusing. Environmentalists question the free parking spaces given to thousands of Congressional employees, discouraging them from using public transportation.

== Rail ==
=== Washington Metro ===
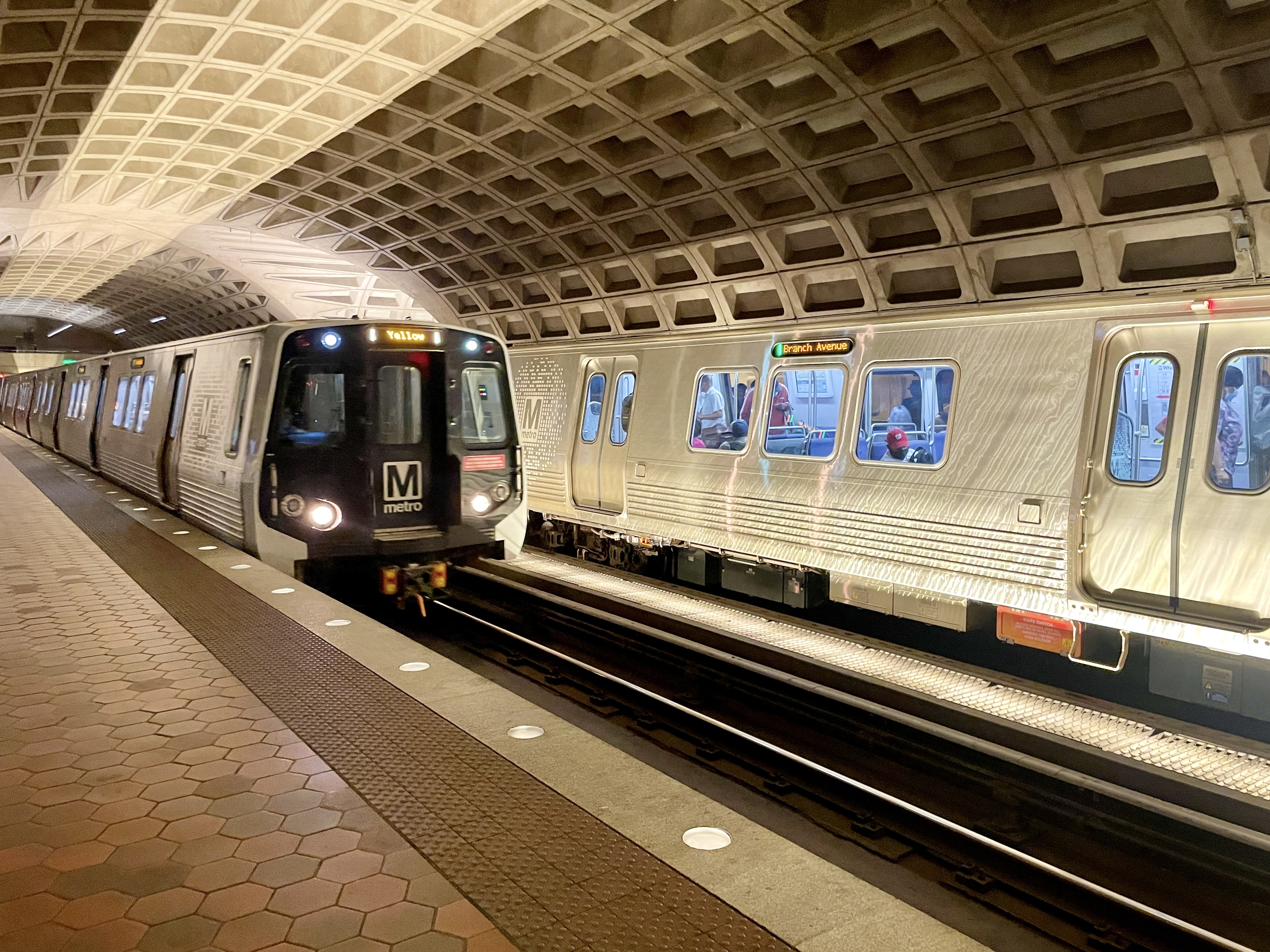
L'Enfant Plaza of the Washington Metro in June 2022

The Washington area is served by the Washington Metro rapid transit system, operated by the Washington Metropolitan Area Transit Authority (WMATA). The Metro opened in 1976 and currently has 98 stations across six lines covering 129 miles (208 km) of track. When measured by ridership, the Washington Metro is the second-largest rapid rail system in the United States and fifth-largest in North America. Riders pay using a SmartTrip Card, and the fare is determined by distance traveled on the system as well as the time of day. Fares are more expensive the farther one's trip is, and are also more expensive during peak hours of the weekday. Many suburban Metro stations have large parking garages for commuters to park in. These garages are free during the weekend but require payment during the weekdays.

WMATA also operates Metrobus, a regional bus system serving D.C. and the closest immediate counties (described in greater detail below). The Washington Metro connects with both commuter rail and intercity rail systems at Union Station.

=== DC Streetcar ===
On February 27, 2016, the first line of the DC Streetcar was opened between Union Station and Oklahoma Ave/Benning Rd, running for most of its length along H Street. The line was originally planned to be expanded further across the Anacostia River to Benning Road station alongside other planned lines. These plans however, never came to fruition and as a result the only 2 mile long line failed to attract sufficient riders to justify its cost. The streetcar was eventually cut from the city budget and ended operation on March 31, 2026. Current plans are for replacement by an electric bus, potentially powered by the streetcars existing overhead wires.

=== Commuter rail ===
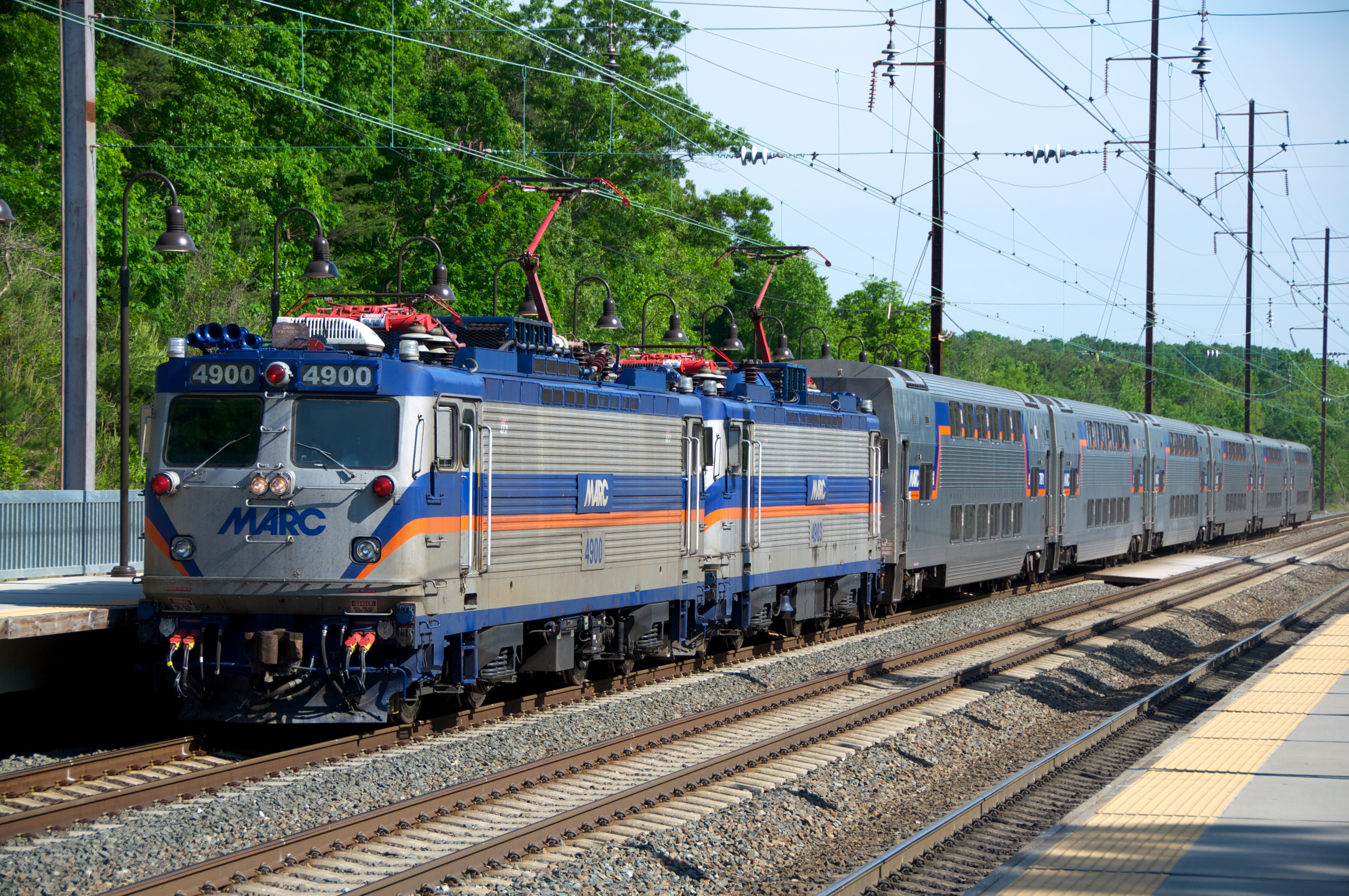
Two EMD AEM-7s lead a MARC Penn Line service into BWI in May 2012.

MARC provides service from Union Station to Baltimore and Perryville with intermediate stops, on both the Camden and Penn Lines. MARC's Brunswick Line provides service between Martinsburg, West Virginia, with intermediate stops, and Union Station. A new spur of the Brunswick line also goes to Frederick, Maryland. All three lines of Maryland's MARC train system begin at Union Station in Washington where passengers can transfer to the Washington Metro's Red Line. Connections can also be made at New Carrollton, College Park, Greenbelt, Silver Spring, and Rockville stations.

Virginia Railway Express (VRE) commuter trains provide service from Union Station to Fredericksburg and Manassas, Virginia, on its Fredericksburg and Manassas Lines, respectively. VRE trains also stop at several Metro stations, including L'Enfant Plaza, Crystal City, King Street–Old Town, and Franconia-Springfield.

=== Amtrak ===
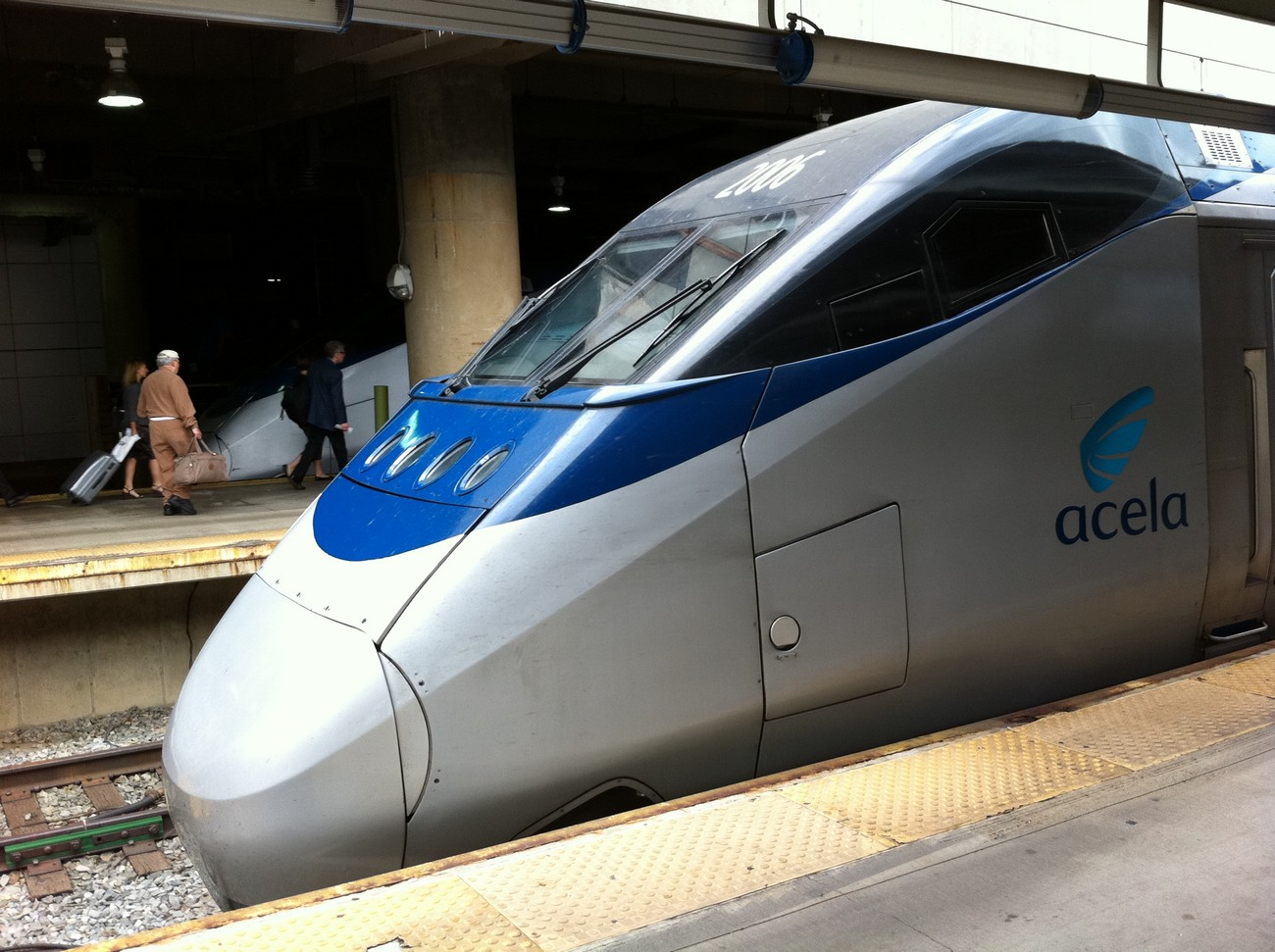
An Acela Express just after arriving at Union Station in May 2011.

Amtrak's Acela Express and Northeast Regional provide service on the high speed Northeast Corridor from Washington's Union Station to Baltimore, Philadelphia, New York City, and Boston, as well as intermediate stops. In addition, the Vermonter provides service to St. Albans, Vermont, via New York. The Palmetto provides service to Georgia, the Crescent provides service to New Orleans, and Amtrak's Silver Service trains provide service to Florida, all en route from New York. The Capitol Limited and Cardinal, the latter using a much longer and more southerly route via West Virginia and Virginia, provide rail service between Washington, D.C., and Chicago. Amtrak's nonstop service Auto Train to Sanford, Florida, originates 30 minutes south of the city in Lorton, Virginia. Connections to the Washington Metro are offered at Union Station in Washington, New Carrollton station in Prince George's County, Rockville in Montgomery County, and King Street–Old Town, adjacent to Alexandria Union Station.

== Bus ==
=== Metrobus ===
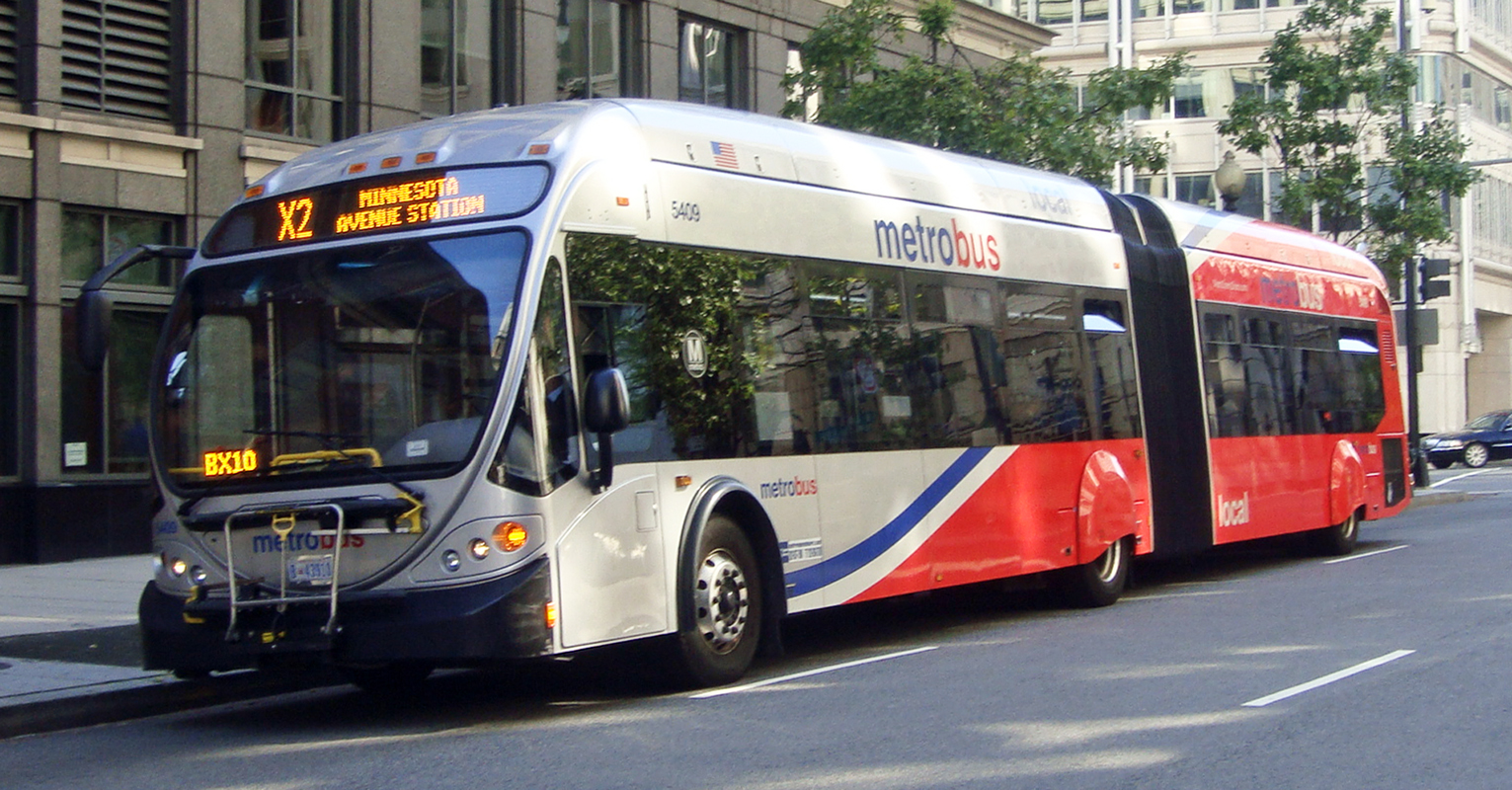
Articulated Metrobus in downtown DC in October 2010.

Metrobus is a bus service operated by Metro, consisting of 176 bus lines serving 12,301 stops, including 3,133 bus shelters and nearly every Washington Metro station. In fiscal year 2006, Metrobus provided 131 million trips, 39% of all Washington Metro trips. It serves D.C. and the inner ring of suburban counties. Like the Washington Metrorail, the Metrobus is operated by WMATA and riders can pay with a SmarTrip Card. Overall, there are 269 bus routes serving 11,129 stops and 2,554 bus shelters across the city and inner suburbs.

The Metrobus runs the Richmond Highway Express, a limited-stop bus route between the King Street–Old Town station of the Yellow and Blue lines of the Washington Metro and Fort Belvoir. The route runs along U.S. Route 1 in Fairfax County, Virginia. Additionally, Metrobus runs the Metroway bus rapid transit line in Arlington, Virginia, and Alexandria, Virginia.

=== DC Circulator ===
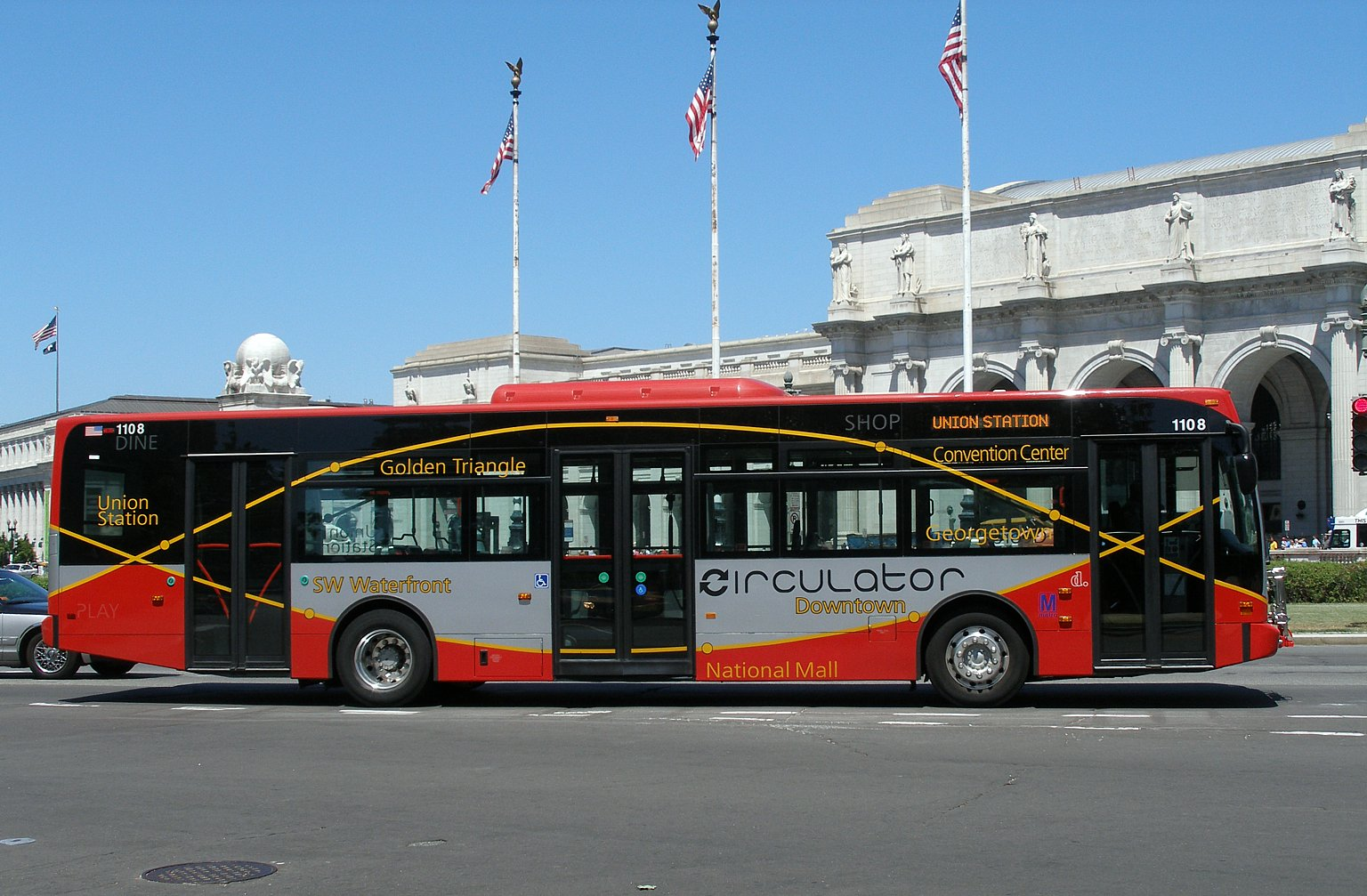
DC Circulator bus in front of Union Station in August 2006.

DC Circulator was a downtown circulator bus system owned by the District of Columbia Department of Transportation, with routes connecting points of interest in the city center. The DC Circulator used to include 139 stops across 6 lines (with a 7th coming seasonally). The DC Circulator used to cost $1.00 to ride, and took passengers through central Washington, especially along the tourist-dense locations of the National Mall and surrounding area.

=== Charter and commuter buses ===
Washington, D.C., has many charter and commuter buses. Washington Union Station is a stop for many intercity and charter bus lines, including Megabus, Greyhound Lines, OurBus, and Peter Pan Bus Lines. A bus stop for FlixBus is near Gallery Place station and the Capital One Arena. MTA Maryland bus service also serves limited parts of Montgomery and Prince George's Counties in Maryland. Local transit services such as Loudoun County Commuter Bus and private companies such as Martz Group provide commuter bus service to Virginia.

The Maryland Department of Transportation and several privately operated companies provide bus service during weekday rush hours between D.C. and more distant counties such as Anne Arundel, Calvert, Charles, Frederick, Howard, and St. Mary's in Maryland; and Fredericksburg, Loudoun, Prince William, and Stafford in Virginia.

OurBus offers intercity bus service to New York City, Philadelphia, Allentown, Binghamton, and Ithaca from Union Station. The company also serves the DC suburbs including Tysons, Rockville, Bethesda, and Columbia with direct service to New York City.

Tripper Bus is a private commuter bus offering service from the Washington, D.C., suburbs of Arlington, Virginia and Bethesda, Maryland to and from New York City.

Vamoose Bus is a private bus line offering service from the Washington, D.C., suburbs of Lorton, Virginia, Arlington, Virginia and Bethesda, Maryland to and from New York City.

Washington Deluxe is an independent bus line offering express round trip service between New York and Washington, D.C. The Washington, D.C., bus stops include Dupont Circle and Columbus Circle. The New York City stops include Penn Station, Chinatown, and Brooklyn.

Higher education campuses in the area offer on-site and commuter transportation, such as the University of Maryland's Shuttle-UM.

Ally Charter Bus is a private group transportation service that offers charter bus and minibus rentals in Washington, D.C., Virginia, Maryland and New York City.

== Bicycle and scooter ==
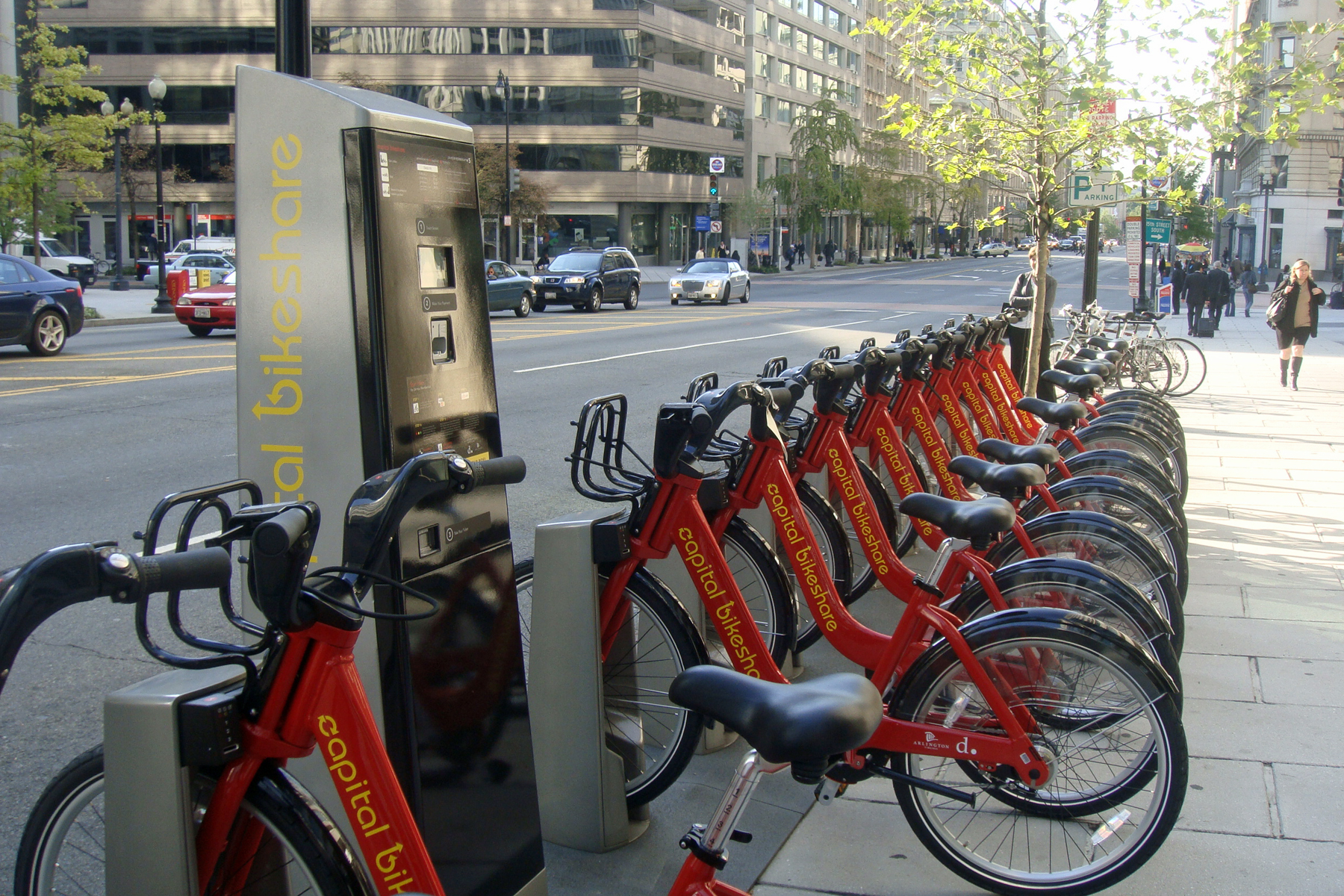
Capital Bikeshare rental site near McPherson Square Metro station, downtown.

There is a network of 45 miles (72 km) dedicated bicycle lanes around Washington, D.C., and there are 1,300 bicycle racks installed on sidewalks all over the city. An estimated 3.3% of the District's residents biked to work at least one day during 2010, and by 2008 the city had the sixth-highest percentage of bike commuters in the United States.

The city's primary bicycle sharing system is Capital Bikeshare, which began services in September 2010. Washington, D.C., formerly had the largest bike sharing service in the U.S. with 1,100 bicycles and 110 rental locations (New York City's CitiBike program is now larger). The city began a dockless bikeshare pilot program in fall 2017, and more recently introduced dockless electric scooters. The Washington Area Bicyclist Association (WABA) provides advice and information to bicycle commuters, as well as lobbying for better cycling conditions.

== Ferries and water taxis ==
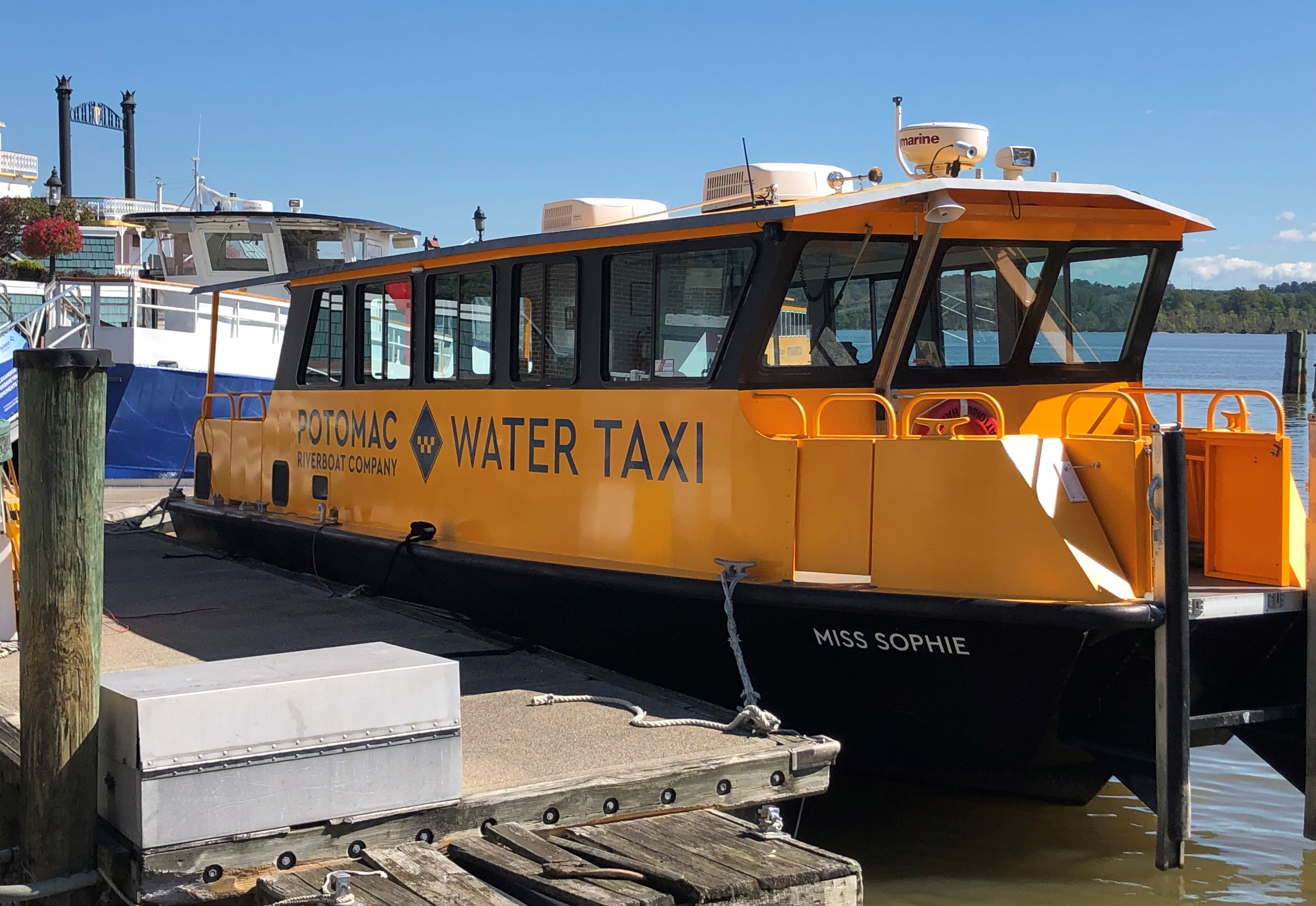
A Potomac Water Taxi docked at Old Town Alexandria.

Water taxi service in Washington DC is operated by City Cruises. The system operates between Georgetown, National Harbor, Alexandria, The Wharf, and the Navy Yard; primary running on the Potomac River. The boats are ADA compliant. In 2026, the system shut down for a period of time due to a sewage spill in the Potomac River.

A free ferry service operates on the Washington Channel between The Wharf at Recreation Pier and East Potomac Park. The system operates primarily operates in the warmer months. The service is dog-friendly with space for bikes, strollers, and golf bags.

== Air ==
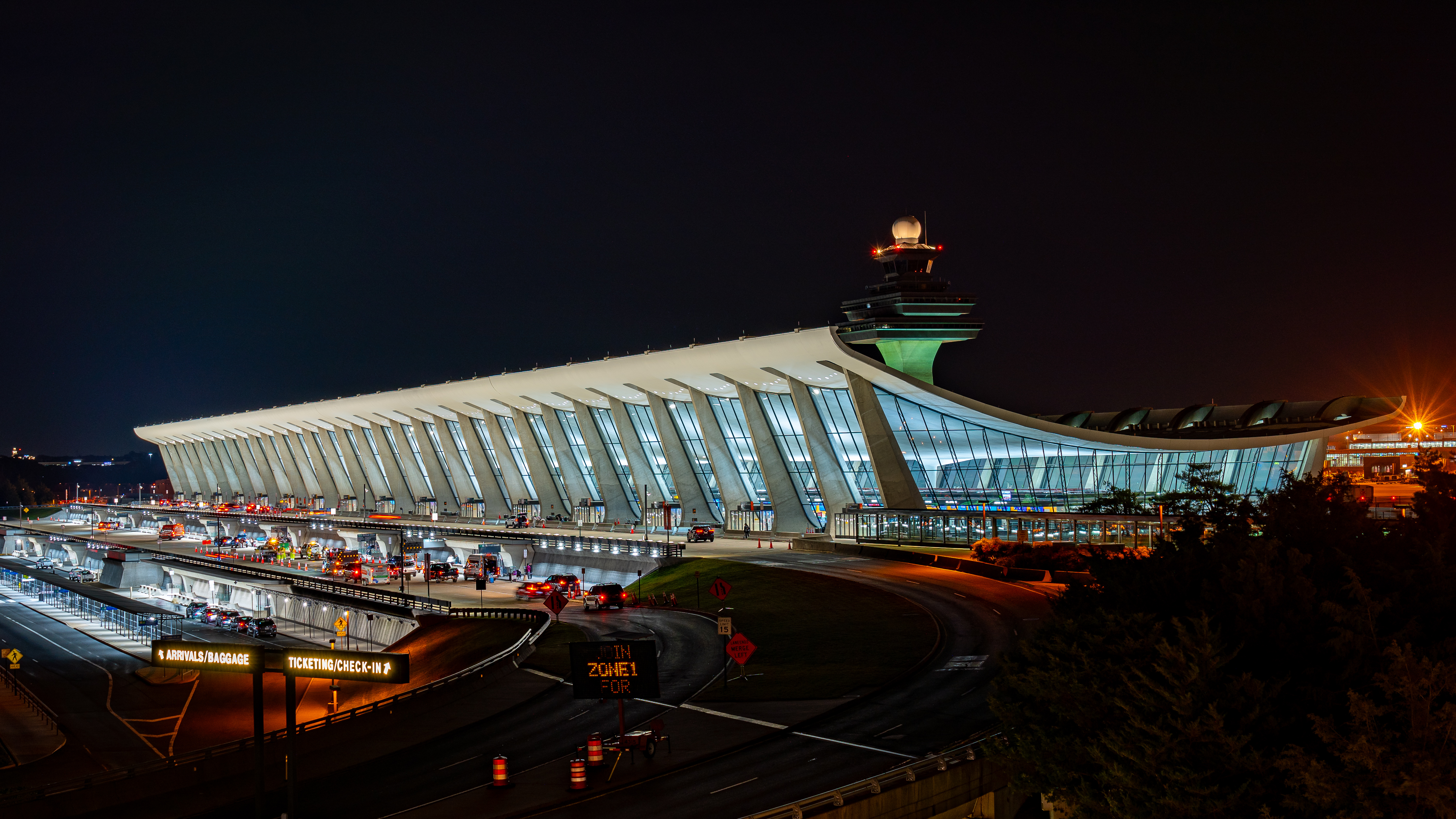
Dulles International Airport in Loudoun County is the primary international airport for the Washington area.

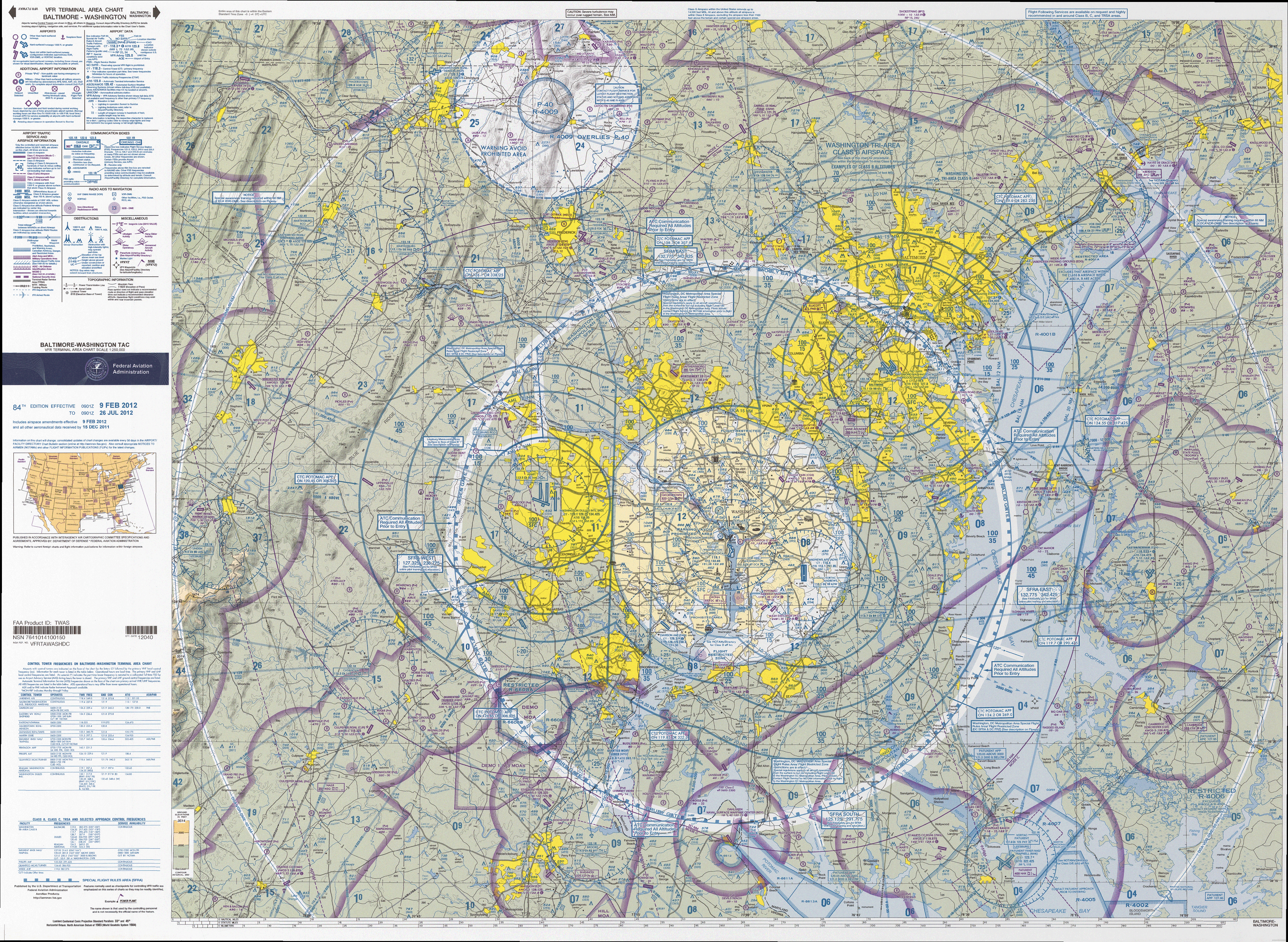
Aviation chart showing restricted airspace in the Washington DC area.

Washington, D.C., is served by three major airports: two are located in suburban Virginia and one in Maryland.

Ronald Reagan Washington National Airport (IATA: DCA, ICAO: KDCA) is the closest—located in Arlington County, Virginia, just across the Potomac River from Hains Point, and accessible via Washington Metro. The airport is a hub for American Airlines and is conveniently located near the downtown area; however, it has somewhat restricted flights to airports within the United States because of noise and security concerns.

Most major international flights arrive and depart from Washington Dulles International Airport (IATA: IAD, ICAO: KIAD), located 26.3 miles (42.3 kilometers) west of the city in Fairfax and Loudoun counties in Virginia. Dulles is the second busiest international gateway on the Eastern Seaboard. It is the Washington region's second busiest airport in terms of passengers served. Dulles is a hub for United Airlines and offers service from several low-cost carriers, the low-cost selection decreased greatly when Independence Air (which was headquartered at Dulles) folded in January 2006.

Baltimore-Washington International Thurgood Marshall Airport (IATA: BWI, ICAO: KBWI), is located 31.7 mi (51.0 km) northeast of the city in Anne Arundel County, Maryland, south of Baltimore and is the busiest airport in the Baltimore-Washington Metropolitan Area. BWI is notable for its variety of low-cost carriers, such as Southwest Airlines, and its few international flights, on carriers such as Air Canada and British Airways.

Reagan National Airport and Dulles International Airport are operated by the Metropolitan Washington Airports Authority.

General aviation is additionally available at several smaller airfields, including Montgomery County Airpark (Gaithersburg, Maryland), College Park Airport (College Park, Maryland), Potomac Airfield (Friendly CDP of Prince George's County, Maryland), and Manassas Regional Airport (Manassas, Virginia).

Since 2003, the general aviation airports closest to Washington, D.C., have had their access strictly limited by the implementation of the Air Defense Identification Zone (ADIZ). The city itself has very severe flight restrictions, and all flights entering the air space around the city must receive special air traffic approval before doing so.

=== Airport transportation ===
Metro's Blue and Yellow lines serve Ronald Reagan Washington National Airport. Baltimore–Washington International Airport is served by rail from Union Station by MARC and Amtrak. The Silver Line station at Dulles International Airport opened in November 2022, connecting the Washington Metro system to the city's major international airport for the first time.

Dulles Airport uses an underground rail system, called AeroTrain, to connect concourses B and C with the main terminal. There are plans to expand this service to other concourses in the future.

== See also ==
- List of heliports in Washington, D.C.
- Plug-in electric vehicles in Washington, D.C.
- Transportation in Northern Virginia
- Transportation in Maryland
