= Transportation in Washington =

Transportation in Washington may refer to:

- Transportation in Washington (state)
- Transportation in Washington, D.C.
