= Plug-in electric vehicles in Washington, D.C. =

As of May 2022, there were 2,360 electric vehicles registered in Washington, D.C.

In 2021, the Washington metropolitan area was ranked by The New York Times as the fifth-best metropolitan area in the country for electric vehicle ownership.

== Charging stations ==
As of May 2022, there were 289 public charging stations in Washington, D.C.

In January 2022, the city council approved a requirement that all new buildings constructed designate at least 20% of public parking spaces to electric vehicle charging.

As of February 2022, it is illegal in Washington, D.C. to run electrical cords over public sidewalks. This has raised concerns that electric car owners will be unable to charge their cars at home, as many homes in the city do not have garages or driveways, which forces residents to park their cars on the street.

== See also ==
- Plug-in electric vehicles in Maryland § Washington metropolitan area
- Plug-in electric vehicles in Virginia § Washington metropolitan area
