= Transportation in Northern Virginia =

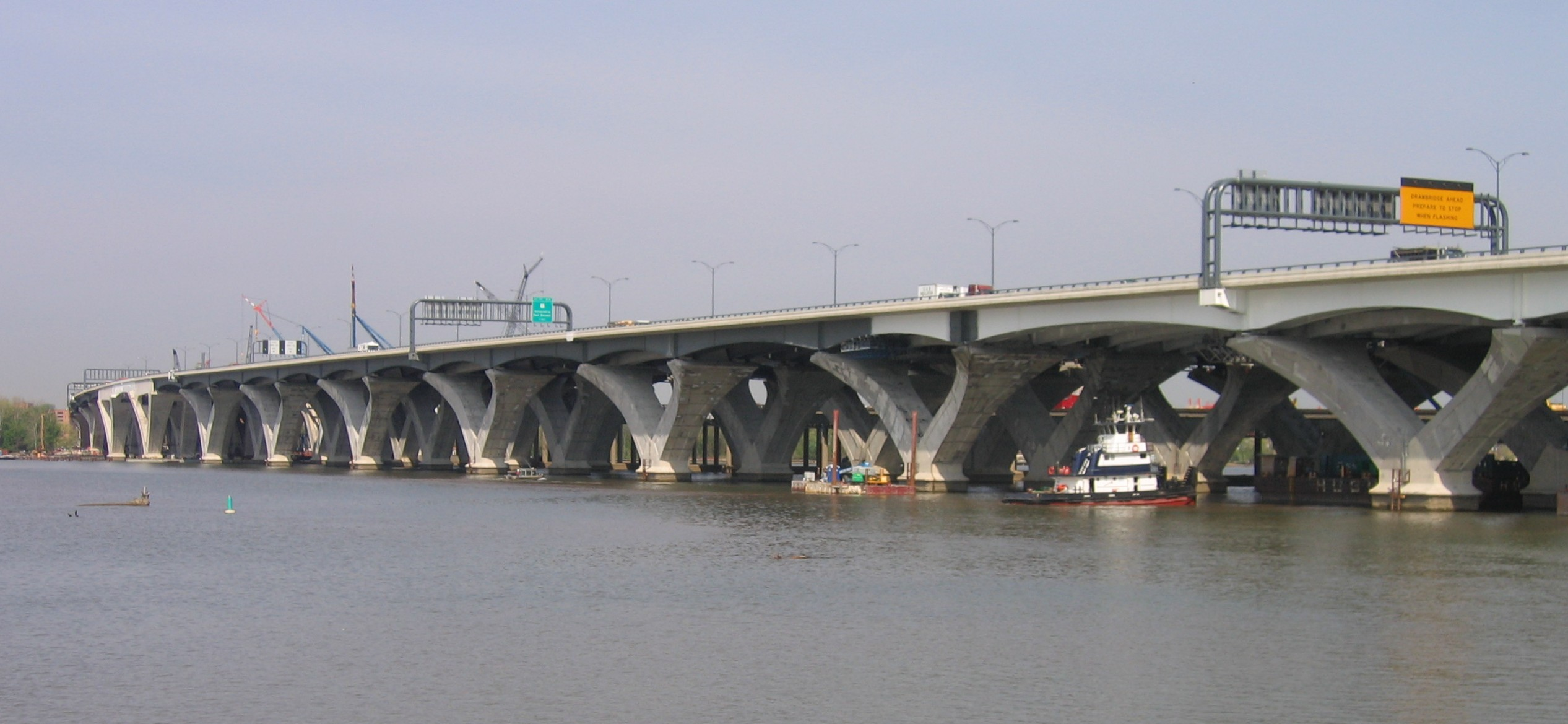
The Woodrow Wilson Bridge in Alexandria.

The Northern Virginia region is served by numerous mediums of transit. Transportation in the region is overseen by the Northern Virginia Transportation Commission and the Northern Virginia Transportation Authority.

== Air transportation ==
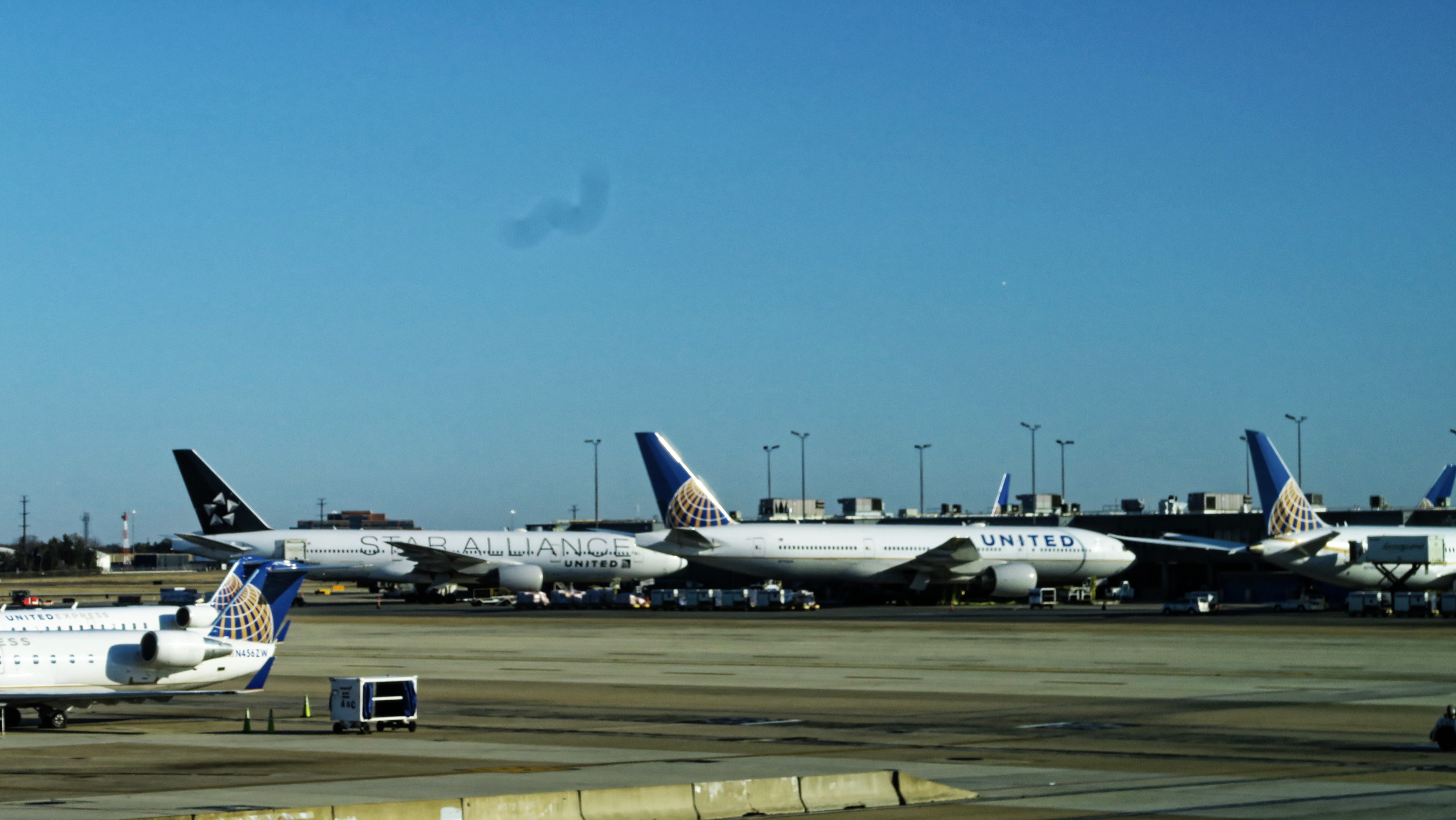
Dulles International Airport, pictured in February 2020, is the busiest airport in Northern Virginia. United Airlines operates a hub out of this airport.

The area has two major airports, Ronald Reagan Washington National Airport and Dulles International Airport. While flights from the older National Airport (a hub for American Airlines) are restricted for distance, frequency, and flight paths due to the proximity to federal facilities, Dulles is the region's busiest airport in both passenger loadings and aircraft movements, and the sixteenth-busiest airport in the United States by takeoffs and landings in 2007. Dulles is the region's primary international gateway, serves as a hub for United Airlines, and has recently improved its low-cost carrier offerings with the addition of multiple flights by Southwest and jetBlue.

Dulles is the busiest airport in the Washington metropolitan area, and second busiest airport in the larger Baltimore–Washington metropolitan area (after BWI Airport) with over 22 million passengers a year. With nearly all of the international passenger traffic in the Washington-Baltimore region, Dulles is the busiest international airport in the Mid-Atlantic outside of the New York metropolitan area. On a typical day, more than 60,000 passengers pass through Washington Dulles to and from more than 125 destinations around the world. Dulles is a major hub for United Airlines, serving as one of the airline's two primary transatlantic gateways.

Reagan National is a hub for American Airlines, Reagan National's largest carrier. American Airlines Shuttle has near-hourly air shuttle flights to New York LaGuardia Airport and Logan International Airport in Boston, and Delta Air Lines' Delta Shuttle has near-hourly air shuttle flights to LaGuardia. Other than 40 slot exemptions, flights into and out of DCA are not allowed to exceed 1,250 statute miles in any direction nonstop, in an effort to send air traffic to the larger but more distant Dulles International Airport. In 2010 the airport served about 18.1 million passengers. Reagan National only has United States immigration and customs facilities for corporate jet traffic; the only international flights allowed to land at DCA are those from airports with U.S. Customs and Border Protection preclearance facilities. Other international passenger flights must use Dulles or Baltimore/Washington International Airport.

The region is also home to the busiest regional airport in the Commonwealth: Manassas Regional Airport, which offers more private, smaller aircraft to land in the region. The airport has service to the region by being along the VRE commuter train line, and adjacent to Virginia State Route 234.

== Road transportation ==
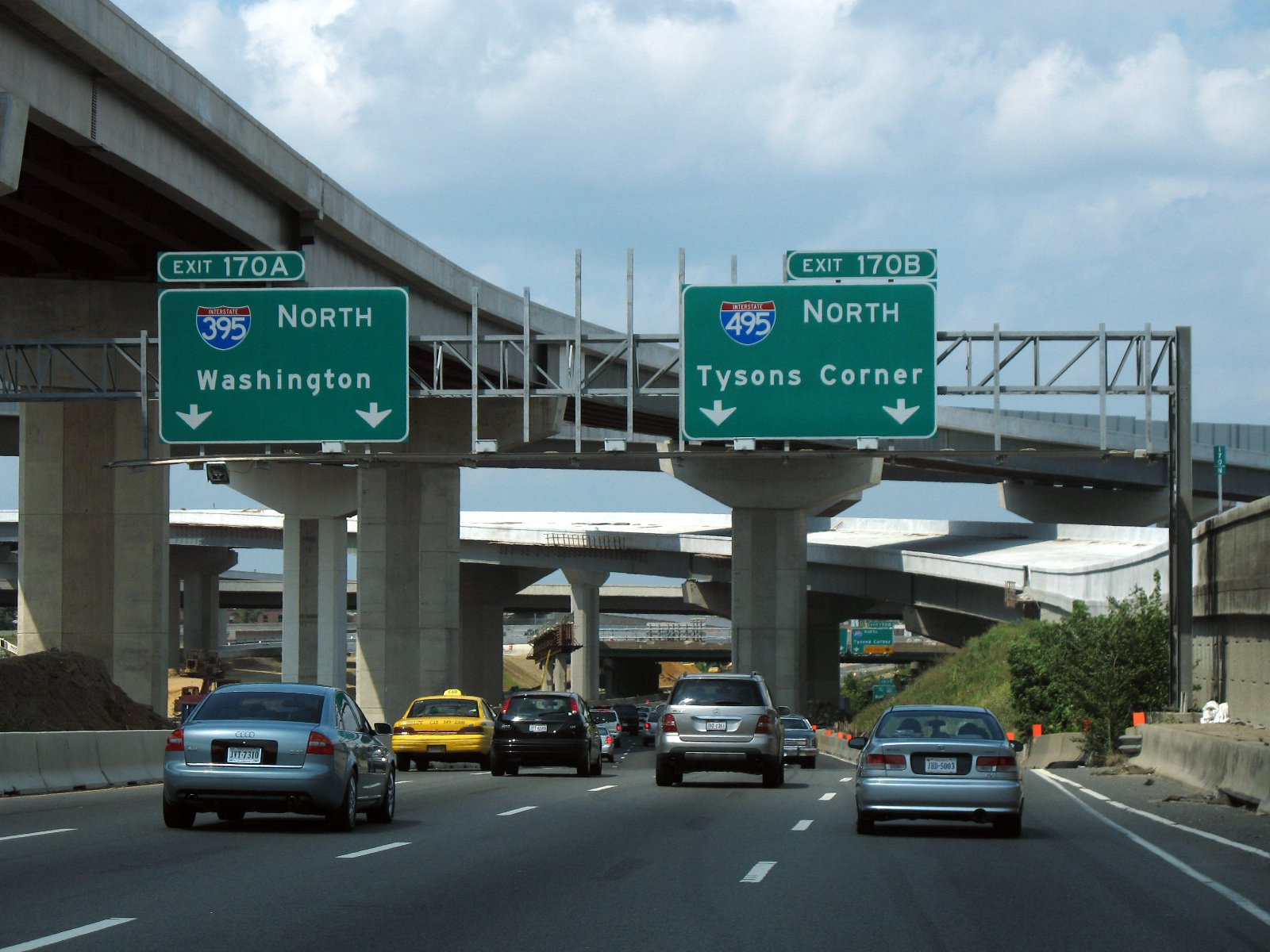
The Springfield Interchange between Interstate 395 and 495 is one of the busiest freeway interchanges in the nation.

A substantial portion of Northern Virginia's transportation is done via automobiles and the extensive highway system throughout the region. The area is served by four Interstate highways: I-95, I-66, I-495, and I-395. Additionally the area is served by several dozen U.S. highways, as well as many primary and secondary state highways, to connect the region together. Loudoun, Fairfax and Prince William Counties contain their own county-wide parkways which serve as spinal corridors to connect outlying exurbs in their respective jurisdictions.

Statistically, Northern Virginia has the worst traffic in the nation, and is home to six of the ten worst bottlenecks in the area. To alleviate gridlock, local governments encourage using Metrorail, HOV, carpooling, slugging, and other forms of mass transportation. In 2002, voters rejected a referendum to raise the Virginia sales tax within the region to pay for transportation improvements; several PPTA proposals to increase Beltway and Interstate 95 capacity via toll-funded construction are under consideration by VDOT. Major limited- or partially limited-access highways include Interstates 495 (the Capital Beltway), 95, 395, and 66, the Fairfax County Parkway and adjoining Franconia-Springfield Parkway, the George Washington Memorial Parkway, and the Dulles Toll Road. High-occupancy vehicle (HOV) lanes are used for commuters and buses on I-66, I-95/395, and the Dulles Toll Road.

Two major regional bottlenecks, the Springfield Interchange and Woodrow Wilson Bridge, were massively reconstructed with completion in 2007 and 2008. Generally, Potomac River crossings remain major choke points; proposals to add crossings (such as near Leesburg or Quantico as part of a long-proposed Outer Beltway) are opposed by Virginia communities near the suggested bridge sites, and by Marylanders who fear that new bridges would bring new housing development to green space in that state. Because of Northern Virginia's high housing costs, tens of thousands of employees there choose more affordable housing far away in outer Virginia exurban counties, or in Prince George's County and Southern Maryland, thus creating tremendous traffic congestion on the Potomac bridges. This situation is much like metropolitan areas of California. Furthermore, localities such as Great Falls, Dranesville, and Clifton impose low-density, large-acreage residential zoning, which forces developers to leapfrog into Loudoun and Prince William counties to build housing, thus increasing commuters' driving distances.

== Rail transportation ==
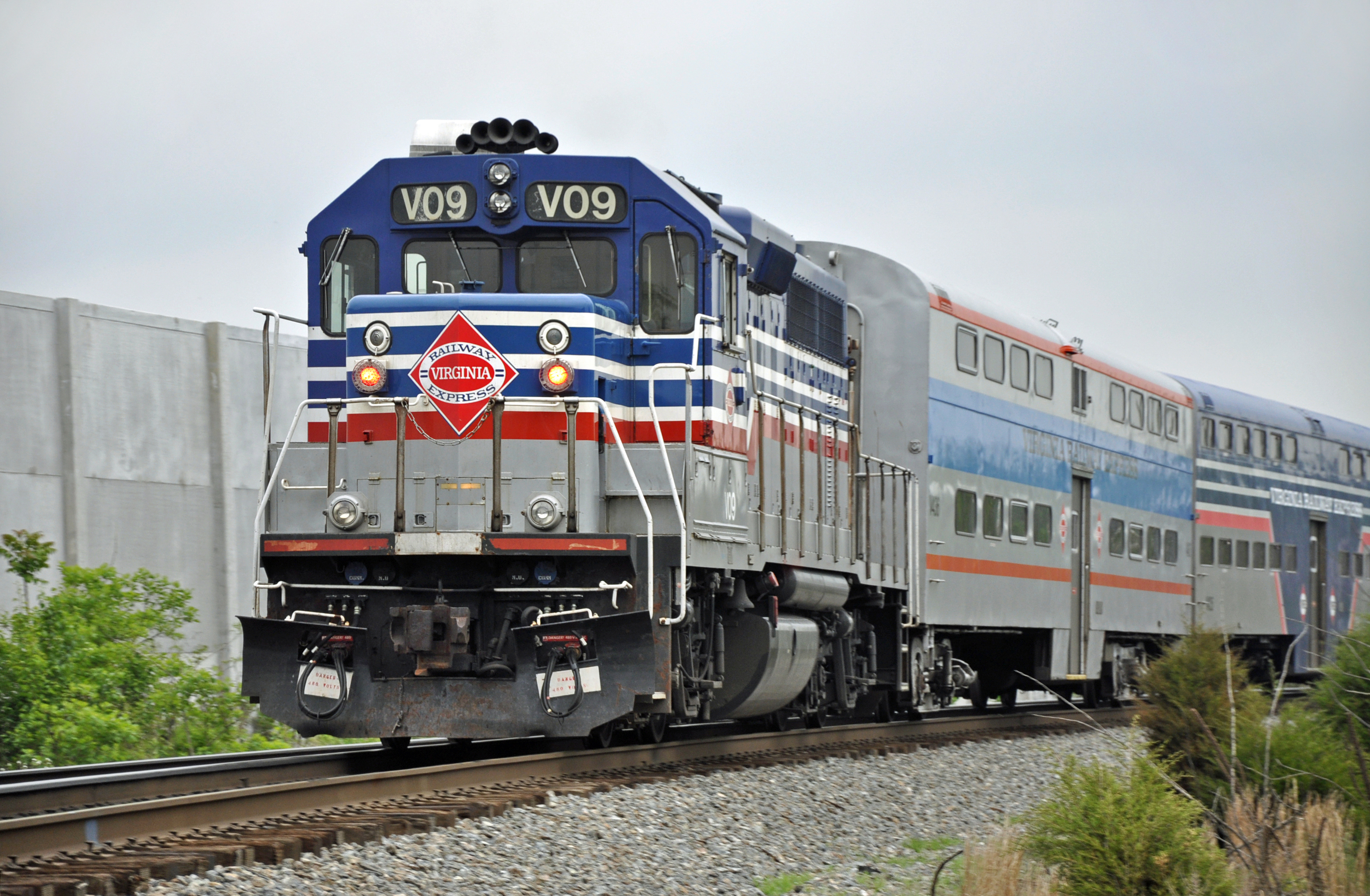
The Virginia Railway Express serves about 20,000 residents daily.

Presently, the region is served by seven different Amtrak corridors, which offer inter-city passenger rail service throughout the nation. The most popular intercity destinations include Philadelphia, New York, Lynchburg, Richmond, Raleigh and Norfolk. The region is also home to the northern-terminus of the Auto Train, which is based in Lorton. Additionally, Northern Virginia is served by the Virginia Railway Express, a commuter rail line. Finally, the region hosts several Washington Metro subway stations, specifically the Blue, Orange, Silver and Yellow lines. Future plans include a light rail system in Arlington and Alexandria to alleviate automobile and metro congestion in the densely populated region.

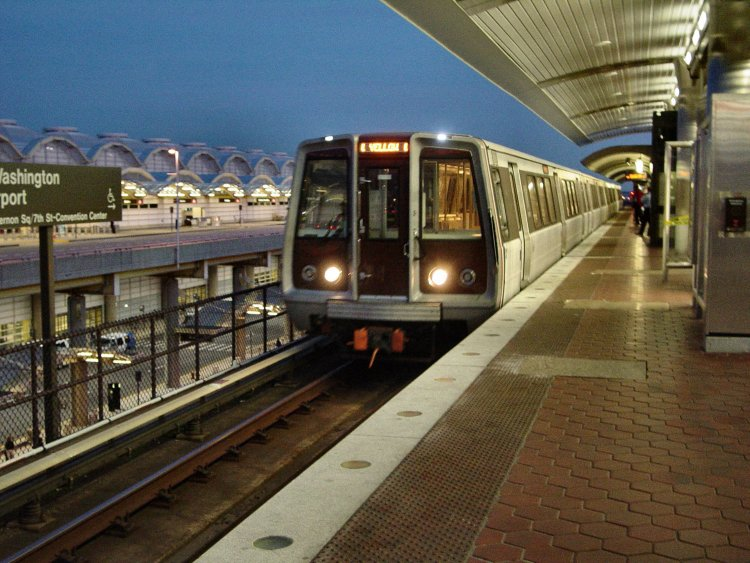
The Metro station at Washington National Airport.

Washington Metro, opening in 1978 to the area, also serving the region's core city, Washington, D.C., and the suburbs of Maryland is the second-busiest subway system in the nation; only New York City's subway system carries more passengers. In August 2014, WMATA opened its new Silver Line in northern Fairfax County, which has connected Reston and Tysons Corner to the system. In November 2022, the line was further extended into Ashburn and Dulles International Airport. The Silver Line will provide an alternative access to Washington, D.C., from Dulles Airport to the Dulles Toll Road which is what the line parallels.

Commuter rail service via the Virginia Railway Express (VRE) arrived in 1992. With two lines and eighteen stations, the VRE is the tenth-busiest commuter rail line in the United States. VRE's two commuter lines are known as the Manassas and Fredericksburg Line named after their respective terminuses. The VRE offers rail service to regions that do not have immediate Metro access or are far away from major highway corridors. The train service is divided into nine difference zones, used to gauge fares depending on the distance of the journey. Due to sharing of the rails with CSX Transportation, construction on a third rail to bypass freight trains has begun on the Fredericksburg.

Although the area does not presently have any light rail service, there are plans to bring light rail into the inner and more densely populated regions of Northern Virginia. In Arlington, engineering is currently being done to create the Columbia Pike Streetcar. The streetcar would be built via a road diet by reducing the travel lines on Virginia State Route 244 in the city. The project has been met with mixed to positive reaction, with some concern coming over the financing for the project.

== Bus transportation ==
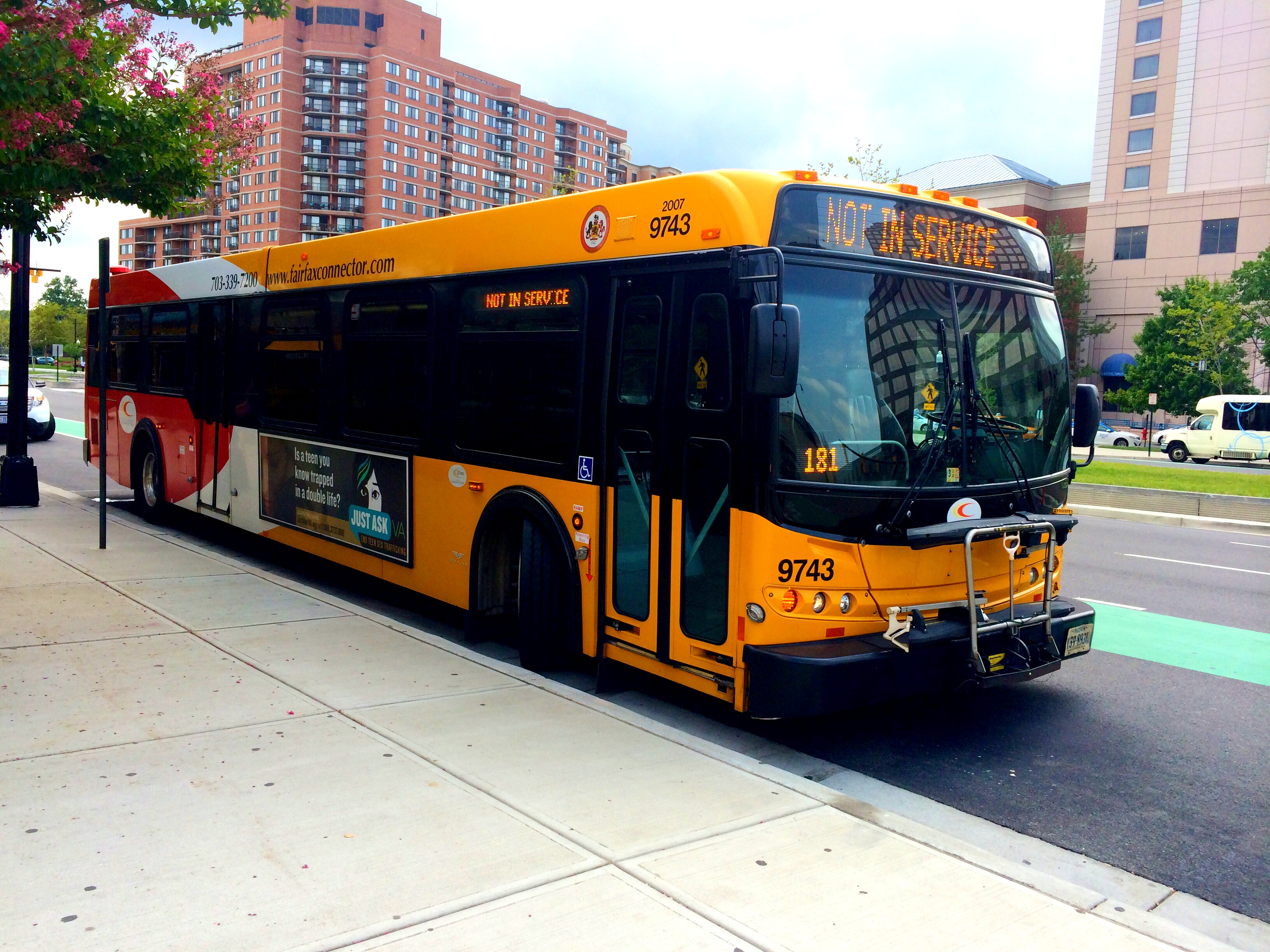
A Fairfax Connector bus serving Pentagon City.

Many of the regions of Northern Virginia are serviced by bus lines. WMATA offers Metrobus service to several suburbs within a five to ten-mile distance of nearby Metro stations. In addition to services operated by WMATA, several jurisdictions in the region offer their own bus services.

- Arlington Transit, operated by Arlington County
- DASH, operated by the City of Alexandria
- CUE Bus, operated by the City of Fairfax
- Fairfax Connector, operated by Fairfax County
- Loudoun County Transit
- OmniRide, operated by the Potomac and Rappahannock Transportation Commission

All local agencies provide local bus service within their jurisdictions. In addition to local service, commuter bus and express bus service in the region is provided by Fairfax Connector, Loudoun County Transit, and OmniRide.

=== Bus rapid transit ===
In Alexandria, a bus rapid transit line known as Crystal City – Potomac Yard Transitway opened its first phase in mid-2014, with eventual goals of converting the bus rapid transit line into a light rail.

== See also ==
- Plug-in electric vehicles in Virginia § Washington metropolitan area
