= Plug-in electric vehicles in Maryland =

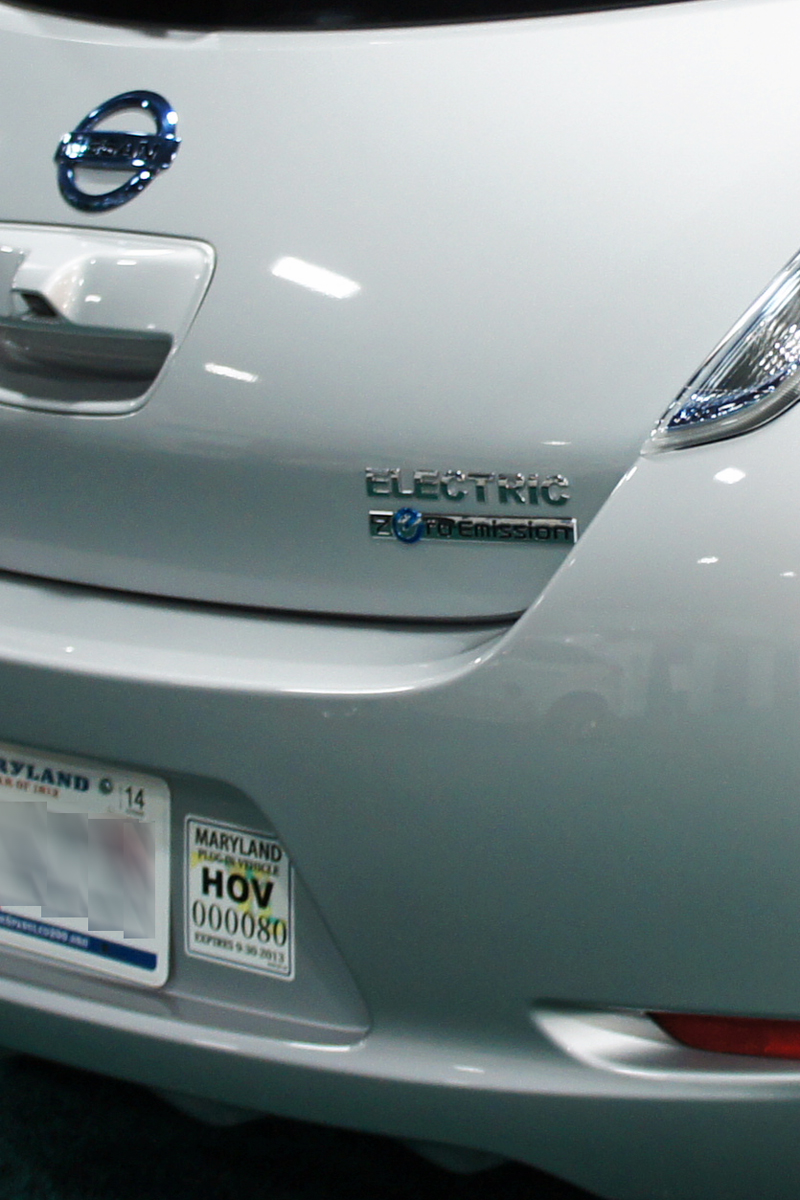
Nissan Leaf with Maryland's sticker to identify plug-in electric vehicles eligible to use HOV lanes with solo drivers

As of November 2021, there were about 41,000 electric vehicles in Maryland.

In 2022, Maryland was ranked by LendingTree as the third-best state in the United States for electric vehicle ownership.

== Government policy ==
From 2014 to 2017, electric vehicles were eligible to use high-occupancy vehicle lanes in Maryland.

The state government initially offered a $2,000 tax rebate for electric vehicle purchases; however, this rebate expired in July 2020. In July 2023, the state government will start offering a $3,000 tax credit for electric vehicles, and $2,000 for plug-in hybrid vehicles.

As of August 2021, the state government's official policy goal is to have 300,000 electric vehicles in the state by 2025.

As of April 2022, the state government is required by law to transition all cars in the state fleet to electric by 2031, and remaining light-duty vehicles by 2036.

== Charging stations ==
As of December 2021, there were about 1,000 charging stations in Maryland.

The Infrastructure Investment and Jobs Act, signed into law in November 2021, allocates US$63 million to charging stations in Maryland.

As of April 2022, the state government offers tax rebates of $700 for installation of home charging stations.

== By region ==
=== Baltimore ===
In October 2021, Baltimore County announced plans to replace 10% of its fleet with electric vehicles by 2030.

There have been concerns about racial inequality with regards to the prevalence of charging stations in Baltimore.

=== Washington metropolitan area ===
As of January 2022, there were about 13,000 electric vehicles registered in Montgomery County. As of December 2021, there were 214 charging stations in Montgomery County.
