= Plug-in electric vehicles in Virginia =

As of June 2022, there were about 40,000 electric vehicles in Virginia, accounting for 0.5% of all vehicles in the state. As of August 2022, 2% of new vehicles sold in the state were electric.

== Government policy ==
In 2021, the state government introduced a tax rebate of $2,500 for electric vehicle purchases. The same year, the state government introduced an annual $88.20 registration fee for electric vehicles.

The state government plans to require at least 8% of new cars sold in the state to be electric by 2024, will require all new cars sold to be electric by 2035.

== Charging stations ==
As of December 2021, there were about 840 public charging station locations with 2,000 charging ports in Virginia. As of November 2021, there were 478 public DC charging ports in the state.

The Infrastructure Investment and Jobs Act, signed into law in November 2021, allocated US$105 million to charging stations in Virginia, under the National Electric Vehicle Infrastructure (NEVI) Formula Program. In November 2024, the Virginia Department of Transportation announced investments of $22 million as part of the NEVI program to build chargers at 35 new locations throughout the state.

In February of 2025, the administration of President Donald J. Trump announced it was suspended funding for the NEVI program. As a result, the state "indefinitely delayed" applications for future charging locations. A federal judge put a temporary injunction on Trump's planned cuts in June 2025, with a final ruling barring the federal government from withholding further funds coming in January 2026. In August 2026, the state announced that applications for locations for phase two of the NEVI program could now be submitted. Locations for phase two of the buildout are expected to be announced in December 2026.

== By region ==
=== Richmond ===
As of April 2022, 2% of new cars registered in the Greater Richmond Region were electric.

=== Washington metropolitan area ===
As of January 2022, there were about 4,000 electric vehicles registered in Fairfax County. As of December 2021, there were 194 charging stations in Fairfax County.
