= Max Martinez =

American football player and politician (born 1991)

Maxwell Martínez
Profile
- Position: Quarterback

Personal information
- Born: May 11, 1991 (age 35)

Career information
- College: Cornell University

Career history
- 2009: Cornell

Maxwell Manuel Martínez (born May 11, 1991) is an American-Spanish former American football quarterback for Cornell Big Red football. He ran as a candidate in the 2021 Miami mayoral election against Francis Suarez.

== Football career ==
Martinez was a three-year letter winner at Belen Jesuit High School as a running back and wide receiver, earning All-Dade County football honors. In 2008, during the Nike SPARQ training camp in Miami, he achieved the highest rating among all athletes. Martinez sustained a broken back injury, preventing him from playing during his senior season.

Martinez was later recruited by Jim Knowles to play college football at Cornell, where he played running back and cornerback. He served as team captain of the football and track and field squads at Cornell.

He graduated with a bachelor's degree in government from the College of Arts and Sciences in May 2013.

He was the creator of the Miami Legacy concept for David Beckham's MLS project.

== Political career ==
In 2021, at the age of 29, Max ran as a candidate in the Miami Mayoral Election against Francis Suarez. He came in second and obtained a double-digit percentage of the vote.
