= Robin Chase =

American transportation entrepreneur

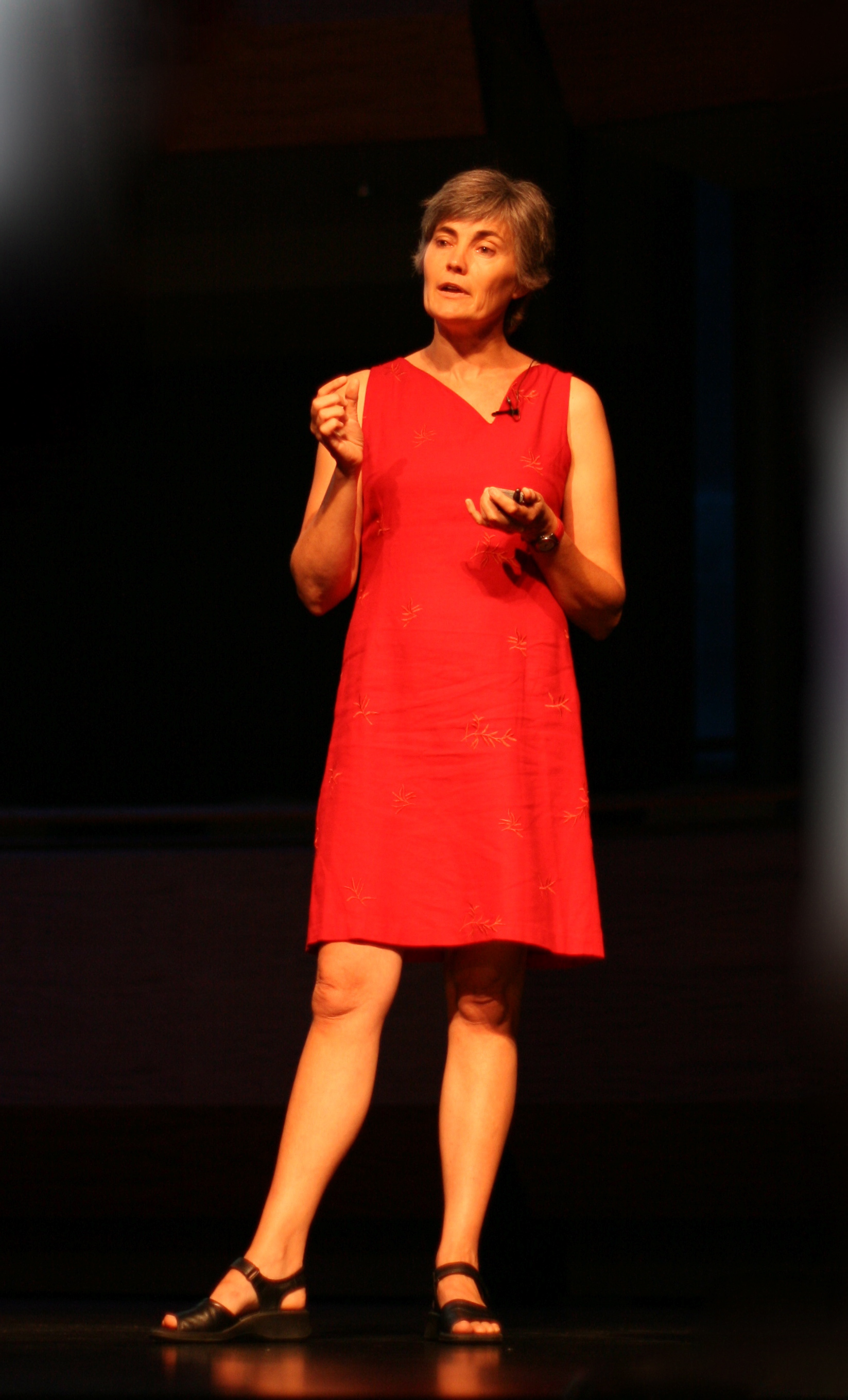
- Chase in 2008
- Education: Wellesley College; MIT Sloan School of Management; Harvard Graduate School of Design
- Occupation: Businesswoman
- Known for: Co-founding Zipcar
- Spouse: Roy Russell
- Children: Cameron Russell

Robin Chase is an American transportation entrepreneur. She is co-founder and former CEO of Zipcar. She is also the founder and former CEO of Buzzcar, a peer-to-peer car-sharing service, acquired by Drivy. She also started the defunct GoLoco.org, a vehicle for hire company. She is co-founder and executive chairman of Veniam, a vehicle network communications company. She authored the book, Peers Inc: How People and Platforms are Inventing the Collaborative Economy and Reinventing Capitalism.

== Early life ==
The daughter of a US diplomat, Chase spent her childhood moving around the Middle East and Africa. She graduated from Waterford Kamhlaba United World College of Southern Africa, Wellesley College (B.A.), the MIT Sloan School of Management (M.B.A.), and won a Loeb Fellowship at the Harvard Graduate School of Design.

== Career ==
In 2000, Chase co-founded Zipcar with Antje Danielson. In January 2001, Chase fired Danielson after she petitioned Zipcar's board for the ability to make hiring and firing decisions without consulting them. In February 2003, after difficulties in securing additional rounds of funding, Chase was replaced as CEO by the Zipcar board with Scott Griffith.

In addition to Veniam, Chase has served as a board member for the World Resources Institute, and has been since 2014 chairperson of the board for the Nasdaq and TSE listed Tucows Inc.

Formerly, she served on the board of the Massachusetts Department of Transportation, was a member of the World Economic Forum's Transportation Council, a member of the National Advisory Council on Innovation and Entrepreneurship, the US Department of Transportation Intelligent Transportation Systems Program Advisory Committee, the Boston Mayor's Wireless Task Force, and Governor Deval Patrick's Transportation Transition Team.

She has appeared in national media such as the Today Show, The New York Times, National Public Radio, Wired, Newsweek and Time magazines, and has been mentioned in several books on entrepreneurship.

Chase is a proponent for the creation of a wireless mesh network so that end-user devices can create a shared wireless network.

In France she started Buzzcar, now Getaround.com a car sharing system See TED Talk

== Awards ==
Chase has won several awards. She was listed as one of Time's 100 Most Influential People in 2009, received the Massachusetts Governor's Award for Entrepreneurial Spirit, Start-up Woman of the Year, Business Week’s top 10 designers, Fast Company's Fast 50 Champions of Innovation, technology and innovation awards from Fortune, CIO, and InfoWorld magazines, and numerous environmental awards from national, state and local governments and organizations.
