= Scott Griffith =

- Occupations: Former Chairman and CEO of Zipcar

Scott Griffith was the chairman and chief executive officer of Zipcar, Inc. from February 2003 until his resignation on March 15, 2013, following the acquisition of Zipcar by Avis Budget Group. As of October 2020, Griffith is the CEO of Ford Autonomous Vehicles & Mobility Businesses at Ford Motor Company.

Griffith has a BS in engineering from Carnegie Mellon University in 1981 and an MBA from the University of Chicago Booth School of Business in 1990.

While Griffith was CEO, Zipcar became the world's largest car-sharing service. In the fall of 2007, Zipcar merged with Flexcar, with Griffith as CEO of the merged company which continued to use the Zipcar name. Zipcar also bought London-based Streetcar, the UK's largest car-sharing service at the time.

For his accomplishments at Zipcar, Griffith was named a Mass High Tech All-Star in 2009, selected as one of Huffington Post’s 2010 Game-changers in transportation, and dubbed Corporate Responsibility Magazine’s 2010 Social Entrepreneur CEO of the Year. In addition, BusinessWeek named Scott one of its “Best Leaders of 2006,” and he was the recipient of Babson College's ELiTE Award for entrepreneurship. Griffith has been interviewed by many news outlets, including The Wall Street Journal, Fortune, Newsweek, The New York Times, CNN, CNBC, USA Today, Associated Press, CBS-TV, FOX-TV, ABC World News Tonight and Time.

Prior to Zipcar, Griffith held senior level positions at The Boeing Company, Information America, an Atlanta-based provider of online public record information, and The Parthenon Group, a boutique business strategy and investment firm.

After Zipcar, Griffith co-founded TrueMotion, a safe driving technology company, before it was acquired by Cambridge Mobile Telematics. He served as Chairman of the Board while also sitting as Entrepreneur in residence at General Catalyst.
