= Veniam =

American technology company

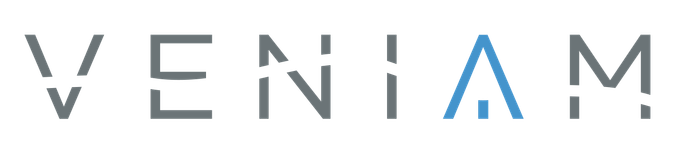
- Type: Private
- Industry: Connected transportation
- Founded: 2012; 14 years ago
- Founder: João Barros, Robin Chase, Roy Russell and Susana Sargento
- Fate: Acquired by Nexar
- Headquarters: Mountain View, California, United States
- Key people: João Barros, Founder & CEO; Rui Costa, CTO; Jane Hoffer, CBO
- Services: Vehicle based Mesh Networks & Connected Vehicles

Veniam was an American technology company focused on building large WiFi mesh networks using moving vehicles like city buses or taxis. The company is headquartered in Mountain View, California and was founded in 2012. Its technology was used in Porto's city buses with about 230,000 users with onboard units (OBUs) installed on over 600 buses, taxis and garbage trucks. It aimed to equip many moving things with wireless hotspots creating a mesh that could be used to build sensors to turn the city smarter.Each vehicle is equipped with a NetRider, a multi network unit with Wi-Fi (802.11p), DSRC, GPS and 4G/LTE connectivity.

== History ==
Veniam was founded by João Barros, its CEO, Roy Russell, former Zipcar CTO, Susana Sargento, a professor at the University of Aveiro, and Robin Chase, former CEO of Zipcar and Buzzcar. It received 4.9 million dollars in 2014 in a funding round from True Ventures, USV and Cane Investments.

Veniam was acquired by Nexar in 2022.
