= Francis Suarez =

American lawyer and politician (born 1977)

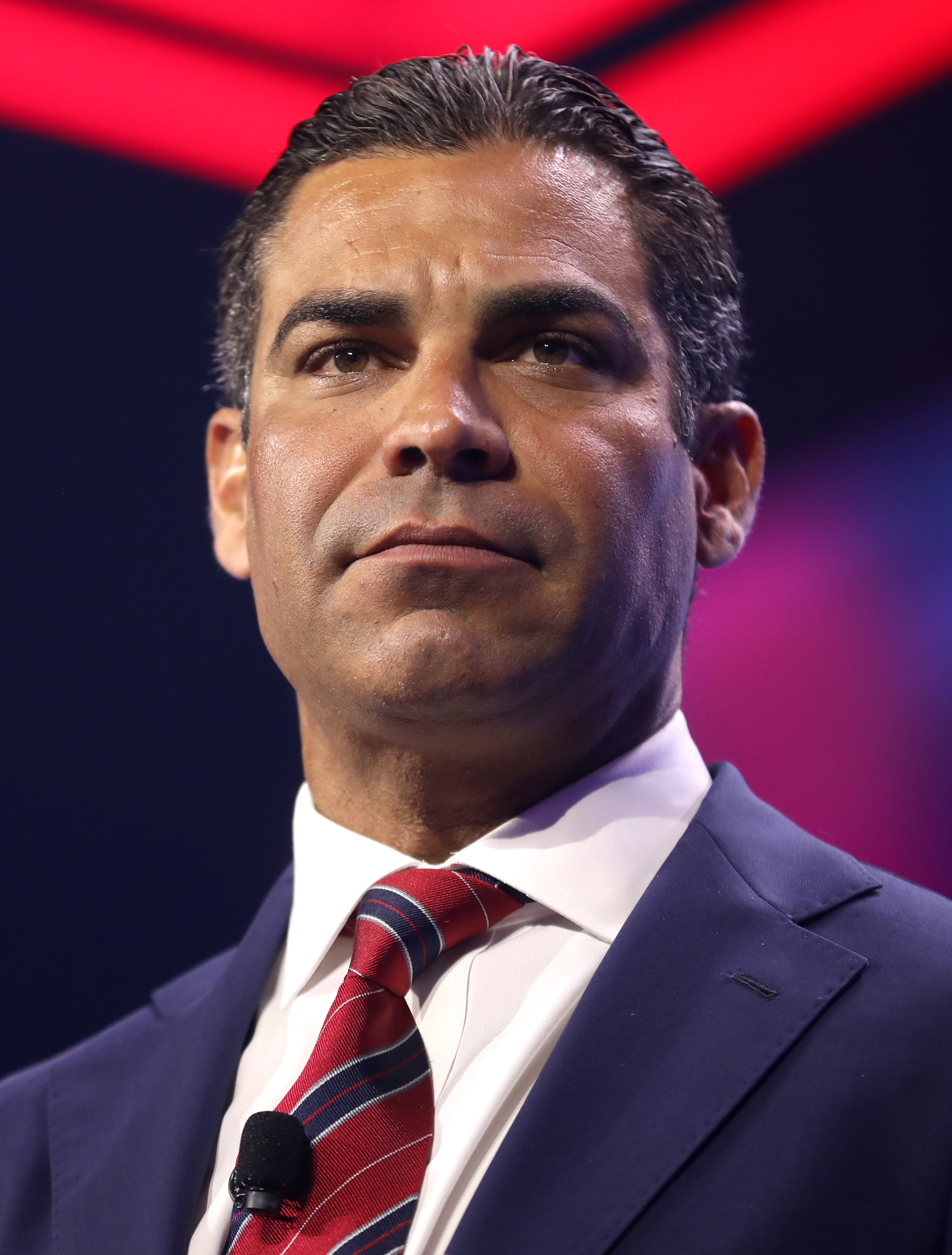
- Suarez in 2023

43rd Mayor of Miami
- In office November 15, 2017 – December 18, 2025
- Preceded by: Tomás Regalado
- Succeeded by: Eileen Higgins

80th President of the United States Conference of Mayors
- In office January 2022 – June 2023
- Preceded by: Nan Whaley
- Succeeded by: Hillary Schieve

Member of the Miami City Commission from the 4th district
- In office November 25, 2009 – November 15, 2017
- Preceded by: Tomás Regalado
- Succeeded by: Manolo Reyes

Personal details
- Born: Francis Xavier Suarez; October 6, 1977 (age 49) Miami, Florida, U.S.
- Party: Republican
- Spouse: Gloria Fonts
- Children: 2
- Relatives: Xavier Suarez (father); Alex Mooney (first cousin)
- Education: Florida International University (BBA); University of Florida (JD)

Francis Xavier Suarez (/swɑːˈrɛz/ SWAH-rez; born October 6, 1977) is an American lawyer and politician who served as the 43rd mayor of Miami from 2017 to 2025. A member of the Republican Party, he previously served as a member of the Miami City Commission from 2009 to 2017. He is the son of former Miami mayor Xavier Suarez.

Suarez is a graduate of Florida International University (FIU), where he earned a bachelor's degree in finance. After that he earned a J.D. from the University of Florida in 2004. He was first elected to represent the 4th district in the Miami City Commission in 2009 and was reelected in 2011 and 2015. He served until 2017 when he was elected mayor of Miami. He was re-elected in 2021. During his mayoralty, Suarez has been noted for his advocacy for cryptocurrency.

Suarez declared his candidacy in the 2024 Republican Party presidential primaries, but withdrew from the race after he failed to qualify for the first primary debate.

== Early life, education, and early career ==
The oldest of four siblings, Suarez is the son of Rita and Xavier Suarez, two-time Miami mayor. His aunt, Lala, is the mother of U.S. Congressman Alex Mooney from West Virginia.

Suarez attended Immaculata-LaSalle High School. He graduated in 1996 and went on to graduate in the top 10% of his class from Florida International University (FIU) with a bachelor's degree in finance. Following college, Suarez chose to attend the University of Florida Fredric G. Levin College of Law, receiving his J.D. degree cum laude in 2004.

Suarez became an attorney with the law firm Greenspoon Marder, specializing in corporate and real estate transactions.

Suarez's father, Xavier Suarez, served as mayor of Miami in the 1990s.

Suarez was serving on his local homeowner association when a home burglary prompted his motivation to get involved in local government.

== Miami city commissioner (2009–2017) ==
Tomás Regalado had resigned from the Miami City Commission's District 4 seat in 2009 to become mayor. The special election to fill the vacancy on November 3, 2009 resulted in a runoff election when any candidate failed to reach a majority of the returns: Suarez (44.74 percent), Manolo Reyes (40.50 percent), Denis Rod (5.15 percent) and Oscar Rodriguez-Fonts (9.61 percent). District 4 represented portions of the city's westernmost reaches. The runoff election on November 17, 2009 had Suarez receiving 51.41 percent of the vote. He was reelected unopposed in both 2011 and 2015.

In January 2013 the Miami Herald wrote that in his first three years on the City Commission "Suarez has had mixed results passing policy." Suarez introduced a controversial motion that was passed by the City Commission, resulting in a decrease to city employees salaries. He also was an advocate for changes that were made to the zoning code of the city aimed at easing the ability to construct affordable housing. However, Suarez was unsuccessful in a push to move the city from using a weak mayor form of government to adopting a strong mayor form of government.

Suarez was initially a close ally of Mayor Regaldo. In late 2011, Regaldo asked Suarez to hold the chairmanship of the City Commission. After Regaldo was at odds with Police Chief Miguel Exposito, Suarez introduced a controversial motion to fire Exposito, which was passed by the City Commission. However, in mid-2012 Suarez became critical of Regaldo's leadership, attacking high turnover among Regaldo's staff and questioning the finance department's ability to balance the city's budget on time. Suarez even came to criticize Regaldo's feud with former police chief Exposito. Suarez ultimately announced a campaign to unseat Regaldo in the 2013 mayoral election.

Suarez was an opponent of red light cameras in the city, which had become a controversial issue in Miami. In 2016, the City Commission ratified an ordinance sponsored by Suarez which banned the practice of conversion therapy on minors.

=== 2013 mayoral campaign ===
Suarez was widely anticipated to challenge incumbent Miami mayor Tomás Regaldo in the November 2013 mayoral election. In anticipation of his campaign, Suarez fundraised significantly at the end of 2012, with his "political communications organization" raising $460,000. This eclipsed the $160,000 that Regaldo had raised for his reelection by the end of 2012. Contributors to Suarez included Jackson Health System CEO and former Miami city manager Carlos A. Migoya as well as former Miami mayor Manny Diaz.

On January 15, 2013, Suarez officially announced his candidacy in a press conference he held outside of his personal resident in the Coral Gate neighborhood. Suarez's father attended the press conference and supported Suarez's candidacy. Suarez stated that, if elected, he would provide the city with "forward-thinking and innovative" governance. Suarez declared his campaign platform would focus on increasing the city's emergency financial reserves, helping small businesses, strengthen the city's police department, and elevating the city's national prominence. Upon the launch of Suarez's campaign, political analysts predicted a competitive election. Despite his strong fundraising and support from prominent political players, Suarez was regarded to be the underdog due to Regaldo's popularity with likely voters. Suarez being the scion of a former mayor was regarded as both a boon and a potential liability, as voter sentiments on his father's tenures as mayor varied, with his father having both a strong fan base but also carrying negative baggage with other voters. Suarez's age (thirty years Regaldo's junior) was seen as a likely liability to his candidacy, opening him up to accusations of inexperience. However, Suarez claimed his candidacy provided, "an opportunity for our generation to take a leadership role in the community."

For his campaign, Suarez hired experienced local political consultants, a media firm based in Washington, D.C., as well as a Virginia-based pollster. However, the primary actors in Suarez's campaign operation were relatives of his, including his cousin Steve Suarez, who served as his campaign manager.

Suarez's candidacy garnered the support of fellow Miami city commissioners Marc Sarnon, Michelle Spence-Jones, and Willy Gort.

Suarez's candidacy was rocked by controversies regarding the conduct of staffers. Two staffers became the subject of criminal investigations for forging signatures of acquaintances on absentee ballot request forms. Another staffer submitted twenty online absentee ballot requests in violation of Florida law, which dictated that online requests could only be made by the voter or a member of their immediate family. Suarez's father was accused of possibly attempting to influence a witness in the investigations when he reached out by email one of the voters for whom a ballot request had been illegally submitted. These scandals led to both this staffer and the campaign manager (Steve Suarez) each pleading guilty to misdemeanors resulting in probation. These scandals ultimately led Suarez to end his campaign on August 26, 2013. In ending his candidacy, Suarez cited several factors including "mistakes" made by his campaign team.

== Mayor of Miami (2017–2025) ==
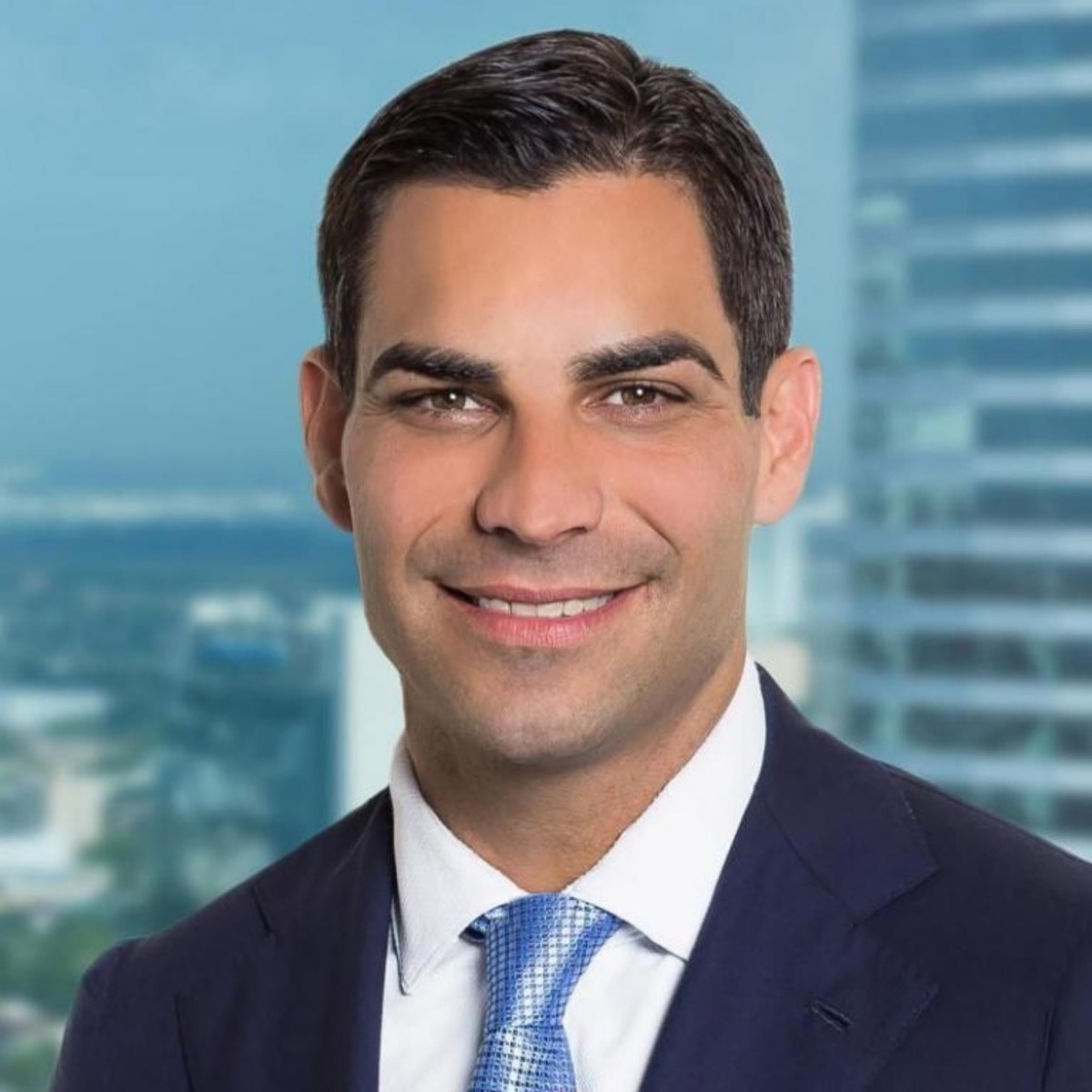
Official portrait, 2017

Suarez was elected mayor of Miami in the 2017 election. The Miami Herald noted that his candidacy benefited from a strong effort to motivate voters to cast absentee ballots for him. Suarez is Miami's first local-born mayor. He is also the first mayor to not be born in Cuba since 1996, when mayor Stephen P. Clark died in office. Suarez was re-elected in the 2021 Miami mayoral election, receiving over 78% of the vote in the first ballot.

Miami is governed by a weak mayor authority system. The city's mayorship is a part-time position with limited power over the city's administration via a city manager. The mayor has several powers: a veto over city commission legislation and the ability to declare emergencies. A mayor has 10 days to veto city commission actions otherwise by default they becomes operational. The mayor can also hire and fire the city manager who runs Miami's government, but the city commissioners can overrule a mayor's choice. Douglas Hanks of the Miami Herald noted in June 2023 that Suarez has managed to position himself as, "the most high-profile figure" in Miami's city government.

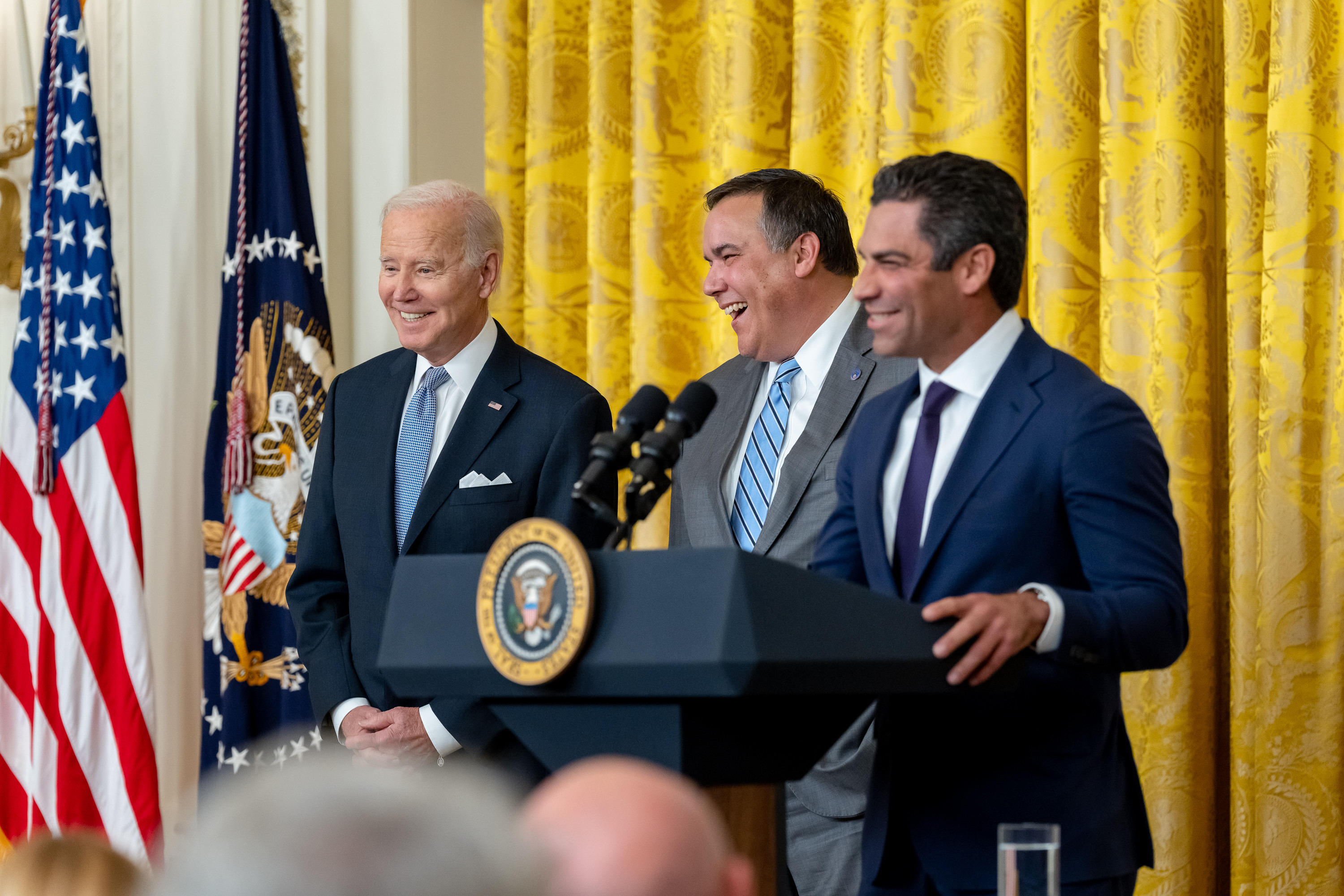
President Joe Biden, Andrew Ginther (mayor of Columbus, Ohio), and Suarez at a January 2023 U.S. Conference of Mayors event in the East Room of the White House

In June 2020, Suarez was elected by American mayors to serve as the second vice president of the United States Conference of Mayors and in June 2021, he was elected as the first vice president of the organization. From June 2022 to June 2023, he served as the president of the U.S. Conference of Mayors.

Suarez was included in Fortune magazine's 2021 list of the "World's 50 Greatest Leaders".

As mayor, Suarez was frequently absent from City Commission meetings. He defended this decision, claiming that being hands-off of City Commission proceedings allowed him to better deal with the personalities on the commission, which he characterized as being a chaotic body whose members had pronounced personalities and heavy egos.

=== Unsuccessful "strong mayor" ballot measure ===
As mayor, Suarez once again pushed to transition the city to a strong mayor system. A November 2018 municipal referendum was held on a ballot measure that would have changed the mayor's authority, with a heavy majority of voters rejecting such a change. The adoption of the ballot measure, which would have led to the mayor having power over city administration (including power over staffing offices that administer permitting and zoning departments), had been supported by many of the city's largest real estate developers, real estate brokers, and land use lawyers. More the $1.2 million was raised from such sources for Suarez's political action committee to promote a "yes" vote.

=== Development ===
As mayor, Suarez has overseen a $400 million municipal bond initiative, sometimes called the Miami Forever Bond, to combat rising sea levels and support affordable housing. The accelerated population growth Miami has experienced since 2020 (which has included an influx of millionaires and billionaires) has contributed to a severe shortage of the city's supply of affordable housing, with Miami seeing a 48% increase from 2019 to 2023 to its median cost for single family residences (as measured by the Miami Association of Realtors).

Suarez played an important role in securing narrow city commission passage of approval for Nu Stadium and its related urban development project. The centerpiece of the project is a soccer specific stadium to be constructed by the ownership of Major League Soccer's Inter Miami CF. The stadium will be built on land that was a city-owned golf course.

In the final year of his mayoralty, Suarez voiced his support for plans to construct of the Donald J. Trump Presidential Library in Downtown Miami.

=== Digitalization of bureaucratic processes ===
Suarez has advocated for the modernizing of Miami's bureaucracy. In 2018, the city adopted the Electronic Plans Review System to digitize the submission of site plans and zoning requests to the Planning and Zoning Department. This was something that Suarez had pushed for. Miami further digitized its bureaucracy by adopting the eStart system to digitize its process for obtaining building permits. Suarez touted this as streamlining the ability for businesses to get needed permits. Suarez proposed eStart in 2019, and it was launched in January 2021.

=== Climate change ===
Suarez acknowledged that rising sea levels resulting from climate change pose a challenge for Miami. In February 2019 Suarez wrote an article with former Secretary-General of the United Nations Ban Ki-Moon on how Miami is defending itself from the effects of climate change.

In November 2019 the Miami City Commission unanimously adopted a resolution submitted by Suarez amounting to a climate emergency declaration for Miami. The resolution was symbolic, having no attached actions or plans. Suarez pledged to spend funds raised from the Miami Forever Bond to address climate matters and to pursue additional state and federal funding.

=== Business ===
==== Role in marketing city ====
Supporters and critics alike often described Suarez (whose office as mayor had limited statutory roles and limited statutory authority) as using the pulpit of his title as Miami's mayor to act as the city's de facto "chief marketing officer". In March 2024, Madison Darbyshire of the Financial Times credited Suarez with playing a central role in "Miami's repositioning as a glamorous global centre."

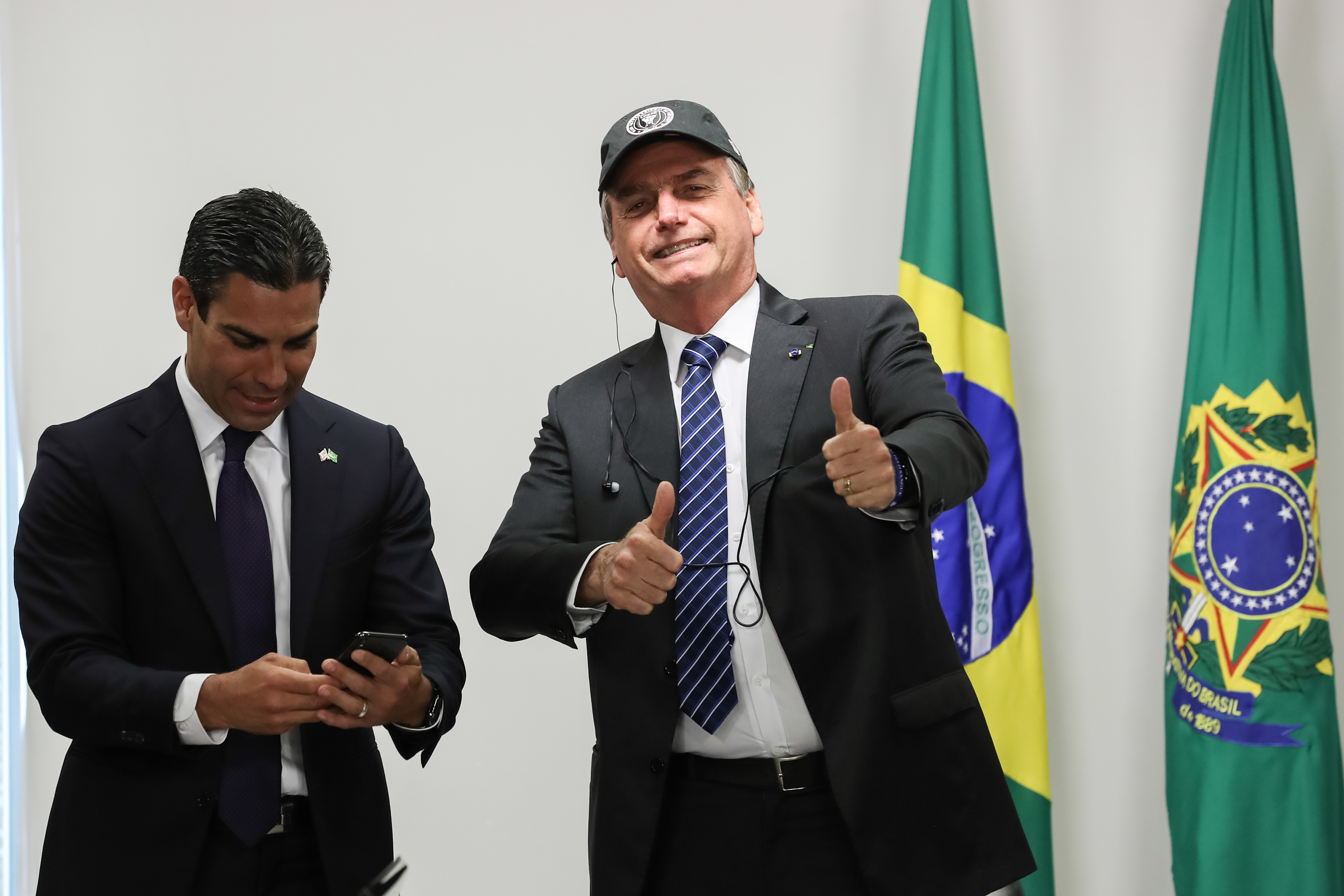
Suarez (left) with Brazilian President Jair Bolsonaro in 2019

Suarez advertised Miami as being an ascendant low-tax business haven akin to Switzerland, Monaco, Singapore, Abu Dhabi, Dubai, Riyadh and Doha. He has dubbed Miami the "capital of capital" (meaning "capital [city] of [financial] capital"). The state of Florida imposes no individual income tax (making those who reside in it for at least half of the year exempt from individual income tax) and Miami has a low corporate income tax rate of 5.5%. Suarez has also promoted the city of Miami to investors as being a profitable location for tech and finance firms to locate their offices.

In 2022, Suarez spoke at the World Economic Forum.

Suarez attracted national headlines by replying on Twitter to posts in which California-based technology company executives complained about their dissatisfaction with California's state government. Suarez replied to their posts with "how can I help?", which he turned into a personal catchphrase. The 2020 tweet, with seeking Suarez pitch Miami as a new Silicon Valley, attracted much online attention. Suarez would later claim himself as deserving credit for the relations of dozens of tech companies and financial firms to the city during his mayoralty.

==== Growth of city ====
The city of Miami experienced an increase in wealth and business after the start of the COVID-19 pandemic. Miami and the state of Florida each saw large population growth after the start of pandemic, with the state gaining 229,090 residents between July 2020 and July 2021 (the most residents gained by any U.S. state in that time period), and Miami experiencing 12% population growth in 2022 and 14% population growth in 2023. The new population (which included new billionaire resident of Florida such as Carl Icahn, Jeff Bezos, Kenneth C. Griffin, Stephen Schwarzman, David Blumberg, and David O. Sacks) greatly increased local and state tax revenue, especially corporate tax revenue. With his eyes on higher office, Suarez has sought to lay public claim to credit for this period of economic growth. His case for his 2024 presidential candidacy was premised on his claim that his mayoral leadership had contributed to the city's economic growth.

Suarez laid some credit for Florida's growth on the Tax Cuts and Jobs Act's capping of the state and local tax deduction making Florida a more attractive state for Americans to live in than states with higher state and local taxes. He also credited Miami and Florida having less health-related restrictions during the COVID-19 pandemic than many other parts of the country as attracting some of the new population. He also credited the post-pandemic increase remote work as allowing people employed elsewhere to relocate to Miami –positing that Miami's handling of "quality-of-life issues" has attracted people from other cities.

==== Cryptocurrency ====
Suarez is a cryptocurrency-friendly politician, who as mayor promoted the development of Miami as a cryptocurrency hub, and intended for Miami to be the next Silicon Valley. Suarez sought to draw cryptocurrency capital to the city, believing that a strong embrace of cryptocurrency would modernize the city's economy and better position it for e-business (digital business). He erected a “crypto bull” statue in Downtown Miami, an allusion to the fame Charging Bull statue in New York City (an icon of Wall Street and the Manhattan Financial District). He also made an effort to persuade the organizers of cryptocurrency conferences to host their events in Miami. His efforts resulted in him being dubbed the "Bitcoin mayor".

As part of his friendliness towards cryptocurrency, Suarez touted the naming rights deal for Kaseya Center (renamed "FTX Arena") with cryptocurrency exchange FTX, appearing repeatedly with Sam Bankman-Fried. When the company filed for bankruptcy amid charges of fraud, the deal was terminated. He also supported plans FTX had before its collapse made to move its headquarters to Miami. Suarez would later comment that his decision to support involvement with FTX had "not matured well," but noted that many prominent investors had been invested in FTX.

In September 2021, Suarez revealed that his ultimate plan for the city of Miami is to abolish taxes. Instead, he hopes to fund the city's activities via the issuance and continued mining of a city-specific blockchain token called MiamiCoin. He also stated that Miami is looking to allow its residents to be paid in Bitcoin, and to be able to pay their taxes using Bitcoin. Less than a year after the launch of MiamiCoin, the token was delisted from its last exchange, OKCoin, after losing over 90% of its value. Suarez lost $2,500 personally on MiamiCoin. Suarez continued to tout the money earned from MiamiCoin, and maintained his support for cryptocurrency.

As a gesture of his support for cryptocurrency, in November 2021 he announced that he planned to receive his next mayoral salary payment in the form of bitcoin (a cryptocurrency), becoming the first U.S. politician to take their salary in cryptocurrency. As of early 2024, maintained this personal bitcoin holding (having opted against selling or exchanging it).

==== Bid for city to host the 2020 DNC ====
The city of Miami partnered with the Miami Beach and Miami-Dade County governments to bid for the region to host the 2020 Democratic National Convention (DNC). Suarez was supportive of the bid, believing that it would bring money into the city, remarking:

Hosting –in 2020– a Democratic National Convention will create more jobs, will deliver more revenue, and will showcase our city as more than just a tourist destination –but a center for innovation, finance and entrepreneurship.

Miami was one of three finalist cities, along with Houston and Milwaukee. During the bid, Suarez supported a city commission resolution that would have (only in the instance Miami was selected to host the 2020 DNC) granted Miami's municipal administrators permission to begin immediate preparations. The resolution was passed unanimously by the city commission in January 2019. A similar resolution had already been passed in Miami Beach. Miami was unsuccessful in its bid for the convention, with Milwaukee being selected instead.

=== Transportation ===
In 2021, after seeing the Las Vegas Loop constructed by Elon Musk's The Boring Company, Suarez raised the possibility of using tunneling to relieve congestion problems in Miami, proposing, "something that could potentially connect Brickell to downtown to the Grand Central station to Miami World Center to the Omni area to Edgewater, potentially to Wynwood."

The accelerated population growth that the city experienced after the start of the COVID-19 pandemic contributed to worsening traffic congestion in the city (as of 2024, the data company Inrix ranked Miami as ranked the ninth-worst city in the world in terms of traffic).

==== Miami-Dade Transportation Planning Organization ====
At the time he was elected mayor, Suarez was a member of the Miami-Dade Transportation Planning Organization. Suarez opted to retain this position after becoming mayor. Suarez has been regularly absent from meetings of the regional transit boards, and has contributed little of note in his position on the board.

In July 2024, while attending a meeting where the board was scheduled to hold a vote on adopting a new five-year improvement plan, Suarez publicly castigated the board as having been inadequate at improving transit. Suarez criticized the $680 million financing proposed for specific projects at Miami International Airport (including an expansion of Concourse D) as too little money and not doing enough to improve the airport. However, he appeared unaware that there had been a separate $6.8 billion capital plan for the airport (to be implemented over five to 15 years), which included the $754 million South Terminal project that had broken ground earlier that year.

At July 2024 meeting, Suarez sought to justify his regular absences from the board's meetings, remarking,

The reason why I don't attend the TPO meetings is because we stopped talking about mass transit, it feels like, and I think it should be an item on every single agenda where we should discuss it, deliberate on it, brainstorm, have ideas 15 minutes, 30 minutes. I mean, it's the number-one issue.

Suarez further criticized the board as doing too little to explore new technologies, remarking,

We're not being very innovative. We're still looking at yesterday's technology. We have to start looking at innovation: urban air mobility, tunneling. What are we doing as a board, what are we doing as a community, to look at innovative solutions rather than just, here, we're going to do more heavy rail?

=== Response to COVID-19 pandemic ===
On March 2, 2020, Suarez responded to the COVID-19 pandemic by announcing preparations for a potential outbreak in Miami. Though no cases had yet to reported in Miami, two cases were confirmed by the U.S. Centers for Disease Control and Prevention (CDC) in other areas of the state of Florida. On March 4, 2020, Suarez announced plans to cancel the upcoming Ultra Music Festival, stating that the tourists attending would greatly enhance the likelihood of Miami having cases of COVID-19. On March 6, 2020, Suarez and the Miami municipal government responded to the outbreak, which by then had resulted in even more confirmed coronavirus cases in the state of Florida, by cancelling the local Calle Ocho Festival as well. Suarez and two other city officials confirmed this during a press conference.

Suarez contracted the virus, which he confirmed during an interview with the Miami Herald on March 13, 2020. He was the second person confirmed to be infected in Miami-Dade County. He began posting daily video diaries to Instagram, showing the progression of his COVID-19 infection.

In April 2020, Suarez wrote to President Trump urging the president to take action to stop flights from COVID-19 "hot spots" from entering Miami International Airport. Carlos A. Giménez, the mayor of Miami-Dade County, came into conflict with Suarez over this. As Gimenez's position held oversight of the airport, he urged Trump to ignore Suarez's letter since the airport was not Suarez's purview.

In July 2020, Suarez dedicated 39 police officers to the task of enforcing a Miami-wide mask-wearing ordinance.

=== Support for moving city elections to even-years; effort to postpone 2025 election and extend term ===
On June 26, the city commission voted 3–2 to pass a controversial measure sponsored by Commissioner Damian Pardo to move all future city elections to even years and to postpone the scheduled 2025 elections to 2026. This would have meant that the 2025 Miami mayoral election would be postponed to 2026 and that Suarez's term would be extended by one year. Within hours of the resolution's passage, Suarez signed it into law. The Miami Herald reported that Suarez had privately lobbied in support of the measure prior to its adoption. The city's decision to attempt to move its elections without the consent of voters attracted controversy, including criticisms from Florida Governor Ron DeSantis and Florida Attorney General James Uthmeier. On June 30, mayoral candidate Emilio T. Gonzalez filed a lawsuit against the city's postponing of its elections. The following month, Miami-Dade County Circuit Judge Valerie R. Manno Schurr ruled that the city lacked the authority to move its elections without voter approval.

The city opted against challenging the Circuit Court ruling. After this, Suarez re-asserted his support for the city holing future elections in even years instead of odd years, partnering with Pardo to propose a new measure that would offer voters a ballot question to do so beginning in 2032.

=== Republican Party politics; relationship with Trump administrations ===
During the 2018 Florida gubernatorial election, Suarez voted against Republican nominee and eventual winner Ron DeSantis and instead voted for his Democratic opponent Andrew Gillum. He voted for DeSantis in the 2022 gubernatorial election. Suarez did not vote for Republican Donald Trump in either the 2016 or 2020 United States presidential elections; he wrote in Marco Rubio and Mike Pence instead. However, Suarez endorsed Trump for the 2024 election.

As mayor, Suarez was a significant figure in Florida politics. He also sought to build himself a higher national profile. In July 2024, Governing described Suarez as, "possibly the country's most prominent Republican mayor."

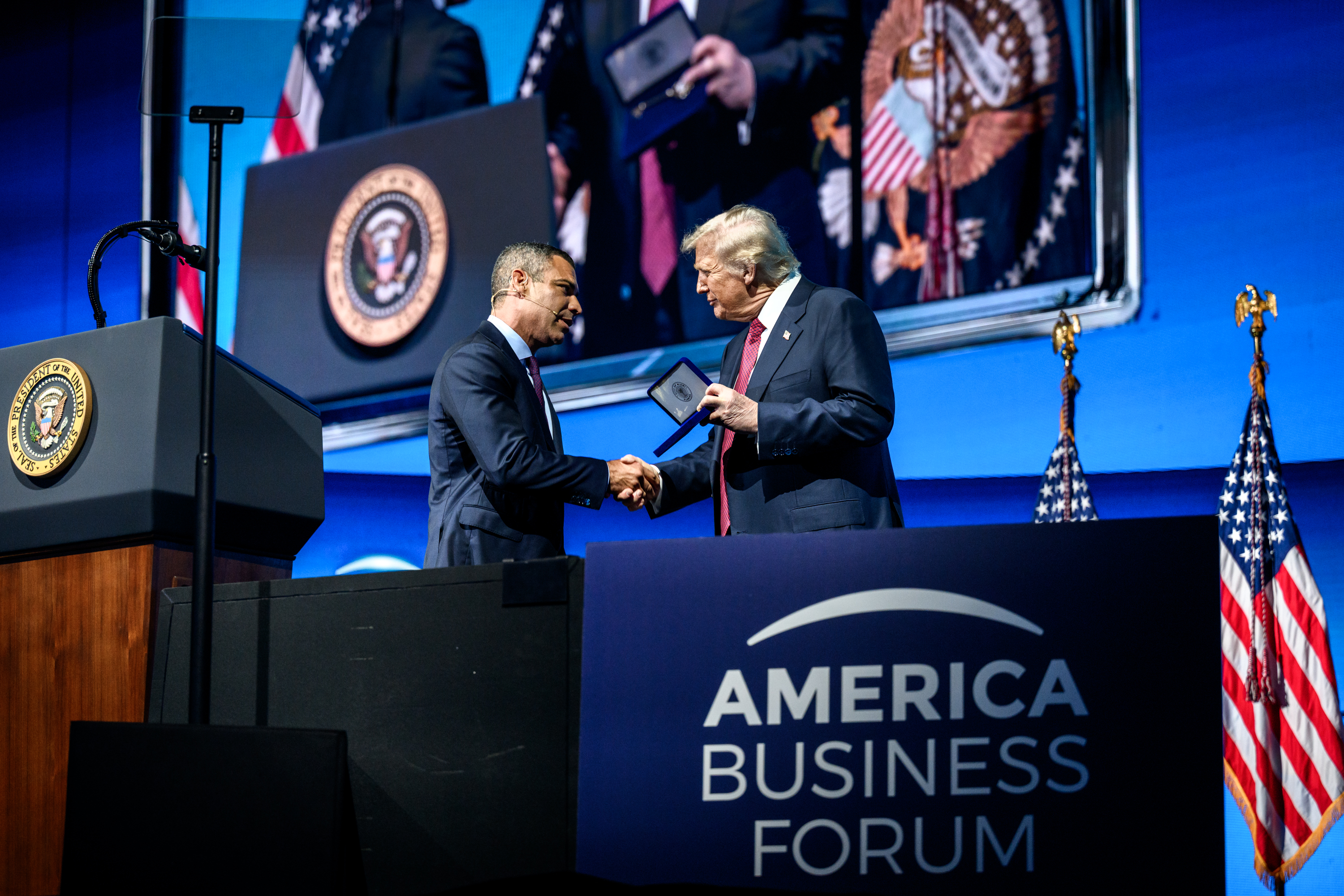
Suarez presenting President Trump with a key to the city in November 2025

During the second Trump administration, Suarez gave strong praise to Trump. In September 2025, Suarez joined Trump in the Oval Office for the announcement of Trump's plans to host the 2026 G20 Summit at the Trump National Doral Miami golf resort. At the November 2025 American Business Forum event in Miami, Suarez presented Trump with a golden key to the city, with keys the city also being presented by Suarez at the same event to soccer star Lionel Messi and Argentinian president Javier Milei.

=== Private sector activities while mayor ===
As mayor, Suarez took several new private sector jobs, resulting in his personal wealth growing substantially as mayor. When Suarez entered office as mayor, he was in personal debt. However, by the end of his mayoralty, he had risen out of his debts and raised his personal net worth to $5.3 million. While mayor, Suarez travelled abroad extensively, making frequent visits to the Middle East for private business, fostering personal rapport powerful movers and shakers such as US president Donald Trump, Saudi crown prince Mohammed bin Salman, and billionaire Jeff Bezos. His frequent travel outside of the city attracted criticism.

In 2021 Suarez joined the newly established Miami office of Quinn Emanuel Urquhart & Sullivan. His mayoralty is a part-time job due to its limited duties and powers. On July 1, 2023, due to his ongoing presidential candidacy, Suarez went on unpaid leave from the firm.

=== Accusations of conflicts of interest and allegations of impropriety ===
Suarez' private-sector work during his mayoralty has created allegations of conflict of interests and allegations of impropriety. Suarez, who works as a private real estate attorney, has not disclosed his clients. This has been criticized, since city officials cannot avoid creating potential conflicts of interest for the mayor without knowing who is and is not a client of his.

==== Ethics investigations ====
On September 28, 2023, an investigation was opened by the Florida Ethics Commission after reports surfaced that Suarez did not disclose travel "gifts" worth well over $100. The "gifts" include all expenses paid flights and VIP seating for the 2022 Miami Grand Prix and the 2022 World Cup. Suarez claims to have repaid all the expenses of these "gifts" with the latter purportedly coming from David Beckham, who Suarez was seen with in his luxury box at the World Cup, and who is a registered lobbyist for Miami Freedom Park, a new MLS stadium development to be built on city-owned land. The ethics probe was initiated after a complaint was filed by local Democratic activist Thomas Kennedy, who alleged that Suarez violated state ethics statute. The matter was investigated jointly by the state ethics commission and the Miami-Dade County Ethics Commission. In March 2024, the county commission dismissed its investigation into potential impropriety arising from this.

The state ethics commission opened another investigation into Suarez, after Kennedy filed a separate complain in November 2023 alleging that Suarez's spending of municipal funds on personal security for his campaign had violated state ethics statutes. The commission dismissed the complaint in January 2024.

==== Federal probe ====
In a disclosure of financial statements to investors, a real estate development company named Location Ventures revealed that they had paid Suarez at least $170,000 to push a development project in Coconut Grove. Records showed that Suarez, Location Ventures CEO Rishi Kapoor, and City Manager Art Noriega met to discuss a zoning hurdle for the development. Suarez has faced allegations of potential impropriety in relation to this $10,000 per month in compensation for consulting services, received from a property developer who does business in the city. Suarez has publicly denied that this work presented any conflict of interest. On June 10, 2023, the Miami Herald noted that "special agents with the FBI's public corruption squad began questioning witnesses this week" on whether $10,000 monthly payments made to Suarez from London Ventures constituted bribery.

== 2024 presidential campaign ==
The Suarez for President campaign logo

In April 2021, reports that Suarez could serve as a running-mate to potential 2024 presidential candidate Nikki Haley emerged. A report by The Hill in September 2021 indicated that Suarez was interested in running for president in his own right. Suarez spoke on Fox News Sunday on June 11, 2023, touting visits to early primary states, saying "when I take the message to people, they want to hear more."

He urged people to tune into a speech he was due to give at the Ronald Reagan Presidential Library on June 15, calling it a "big speech" about the "future of our country," the clearest indication yet of a presidential campaign announcement.

Suarez filed to run for president with the Federal Election Commission on June 14 and officially launched his bid the next day. Political scientists such as Sean Freeder of the University of North Florida publicly expressed doubts that he would be a viable contender, noting that he was likely to face two other Floridians: Donald Trump and Ron DeSantis.

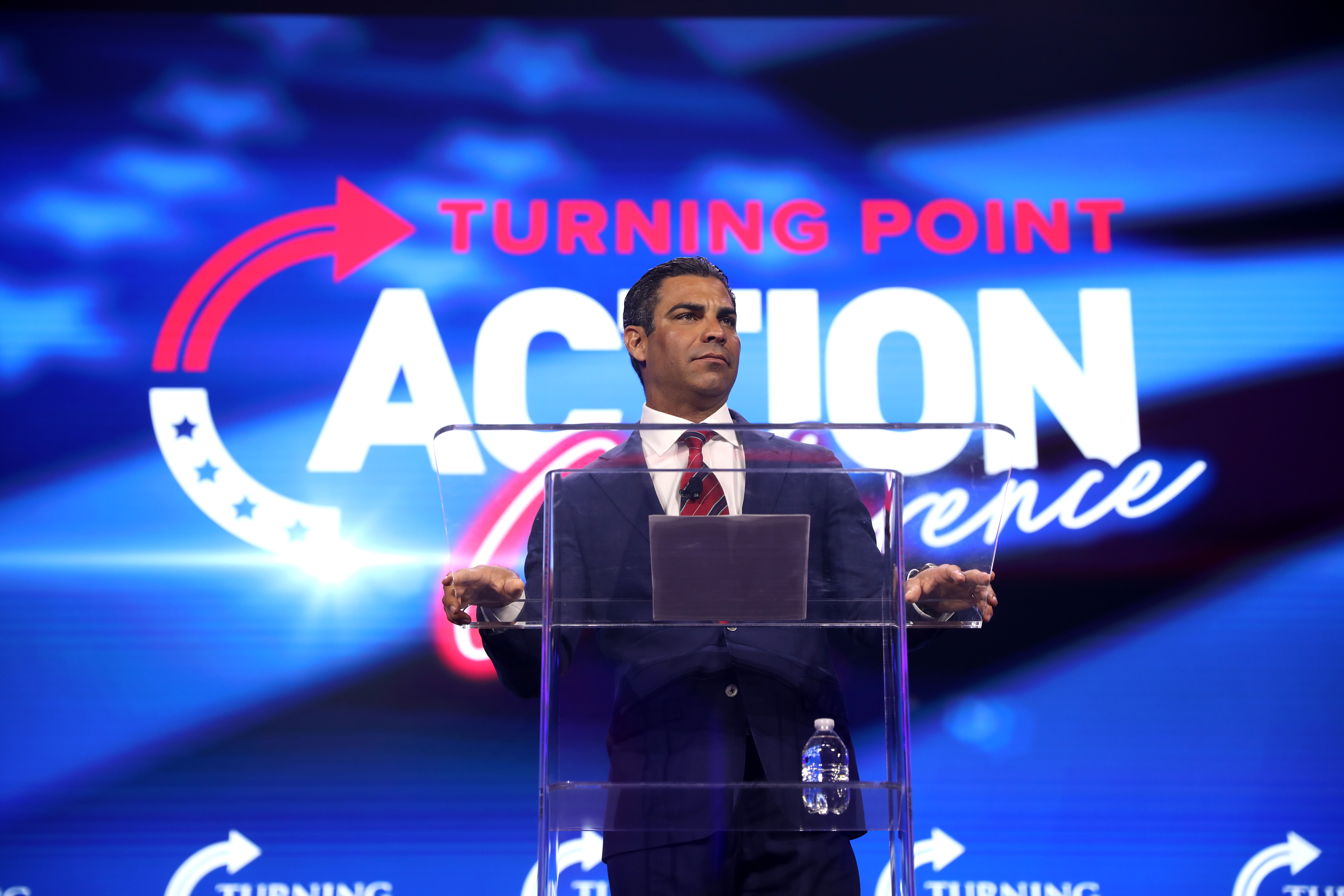
Suarez speaking at a Turning Point USA event in Palm Springs, Florida on the campaign trail on July 16, 2023

While appearing on Hugh Hewitt's podcast on June 27, 2023, Hewitt asked Suarez about the ongoing persecution of the Uyghurs in China, to which Suarez asked "What's a Uyghur?" Suarez then assured Hewitt that he would research the ethnic group. After the podcast concluded and news of the gaffe broke, Suarez told the media that he was confused by Hewitt's pronunciation of the term 'Uyghur' and is very familiar with the crisis. The gaffe was compared to 2016 presidential candidate Gary Johnson's infamous "What is Aleppo?" comment amid the Syrian civil war.

Running for president, he staked out positions on abortion and climate change that were to the left of Florida governor Ron DeSantis, another contender for the nomination.

On July 5, 2023, a super PAC supporting Suarez launched a chatbot that used his face and voice to answer questions about his campaign. The bot directed users to campaign videos based on the questions asked, and was capable of mocking other presidential candidates, such as Ron DeSantis. The program was one of a number of examples of the use of artificial intelligence in the 2024 election, with major presidential contenders DeSantis and Trump using text-to-image models in official campaign videos.

On August 4, Suarez announced that his campaign would accept donations in Bitcoin, as part of his pro-cryptocurrency platform.

On August 8, Suarez announced that he had met the donor requirements to attend the first Republican primary debate in Milwaukee. However, the RNC had to verify this claim before he could be officially added to the roster. He stated in an interview with The Hill that if he did not qualify for the first debate, he might leave the race. Besides having 40,000 unique donors from 20 different states, the other requirement to attend a debate was to be consistently present in polls, which he was not.

A super PAC backing Suarez, the SOS America PAC, complained that Suarez was being excluded from polls, saying that the zero and one percent level at which he was polling was not reflective of his true popularity. Suarez himself argued that the polling requirement was unfair for "relatively unknown" figures such as himself who were competing against candidates who had been national figures for years.

In addition to saying he would drop out if he did not meet the debate requirements, Suarez also called upon all other candidates to drop out if they failed to qualify for the debate at an event in Iowa. Suarez argued that "if you can't meet the minimum thresholds, you shouldn't be trying to take the time involved away from being productive.” Suarez did not meet the minimum thresholds and did not qualify for the first Republican debate on August 23.

=== End of presidential candidacy ===
Following his failure to meet the guidelines to attend the first debate, and his call that all candidates that could not reach these guidelines drop out, Suarez was called upon by the Miami Herald, Business Insider, Fox News, and Congressman Carlos A. Giménez to follow his own suggestion and drop out of the race. Suarez stayed true to his promise and suspended his campaign on August 29, 2023, becoming the first candidate in the 2024 race to drop out.

During his campaign, Suarez promised $20 gift cards to people who gave a $1 donation to his campaign. However, he has yet to fulfill these promises, and many of his supporters are still waiting for their gift cards. Suarez and his campaign have refused to comment on the issue.

On March 1, 2024, Suarez endorsed Trump's campaign.

After withdrawing from the race, Suarez expressed his interest in being Trump's running mate. Observing that Trump was only constitutionally eligible to be elected to a single additional term beyond the one he had previously served, Suarez observed that it would be possible that Trump's running mate could be a front-runner for the 2028 election regardless of the election outcome. Due to this, he opined that, "anyone who doesn't tell you that they would be interested [in being Trump's running mate] is probably being disingenuous."

== Post mayoralty ==
In February 2026, Nexar announced that Suarez had been appointed to its board of trustees.

=== Political future ===
Suarez expressed interest in running for governor in 2026, in which term-limits prevented incumbent Ron DeSantis from seeking another term. However, by September 2025, Suarez ruled out such a run. Suarez himself was term-limited as mayor, and could not run in the 2025 mayoral election.

== Political positions ==
While Suarez identifies himself as a conservative Republican, he is commonly described as being a moderate or liberal Republican. According to a 2023 analysis published by FiveThirtyEight, Suarez's "policies remain conservative (lowering taxes and keeping them low has been a focus of his administration, for example), but he takes a slightly more moderate stance on issues like climate change and immigration." He has said climate change is real and he declared a climate emergency in Miami. However, Suarez has also criticized climate activists for being alarmist about the impacts that they expect climate change will have on Miami.

Suarez has supported LGBT pride events. However, he also supported the passage of the Florida Parental Rights in Education Act (commonly called the "Don't Say Gay" law by opponents) as originally signed, which prohibited some classroom instruction on LGBT issues from kindergarten through third grade. However, he opposed its later expansion to all grades. In 2020, Suarez approved of Miami offering certification for businesses by the National LGBT Chamber of Commerce making Miami the largest city in Florida to do so. He also signed an LGBTQ Ordinance recognizing the contributions of LGBTQ people to the City of Miami.

Suarez identifies as "pro-life" or anti-abortion and supported the Supreme Court's decision in Dobbs v. Jackson Women's Health Organization to overturn Roe v. Wade, the decision which had legalized abortion nationwide. He announced that he supports a nationwide ban on abortion after 15 weeks of pregnancy. However, he also supported exceptions after 15 weeks of pregnancy and called abortion a "very nuanced" issue. Suarez would not say whether he supported a ban on abortion after six weeks of pregnancy, saying instead, "the country is not there yet."

During his presidential campaign, Suarez, a first generation Cuban American, criticized the idea of repealing the 14th Amendment and birthright citizenship. Suarez noted that without birthright citizenship he would have lacked American citizenship. He also argued that refugees from Venezuela should be granted temporary protected status in the US.

== Personal life ==
In 2007, Suarez married his wife Gloria née Fonts, who is 2.5 years his junior. As of 2026, they reside in the Coconut Grove neighborhood of Miami, along with their two children, a son and a daughter.

== See also ==
- List of mayors of Miami
- Government of Miami
- List of mayors of the 50 largest cities in the United States

Political offices
Preceded by Tomás Regalado	Mayor of Miami; 2017–2025	Succeeded by Eileen Higgins
