= 2017 Miami mayoral election =

- November 7, 2017
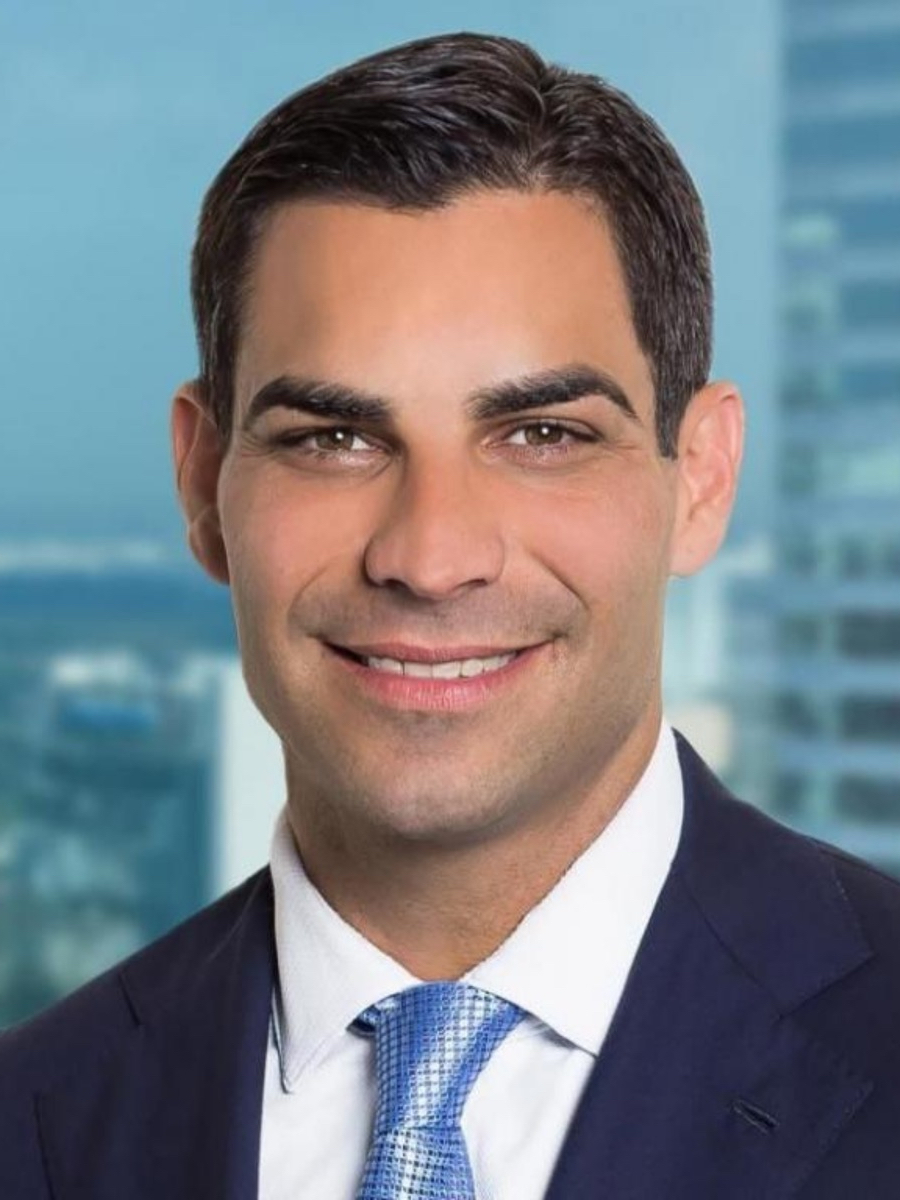

Candidate	Francis Suarez	Cynthia Jaquith	Williams Armbrister
Popular vote	21,856	1,394	1,392
Percentage	85.81%	5.47%	5.47%
- Results by precinct Suarez: 50–60% 60–70% 70–80% 80–90% >90% Tie: 50% No data
Mayor before election
Tomás Regalado
Republican
Elected Mayor
Francis Suarez
Republican

The 2017 Miami mayoral election took place on November 7, 2017. Incumbent Mayor Tomás Regalado was term-limited and could not run for re-election. City Commissioner Francis Suarez, the son of former Mayor Xavier Suarez, ran to succeed him. He faced three little-known opponents and entered the election as the frontrunner, with endorsements from the Miami Herald and the Miami Times. Suarez ultimately won the election in a landslide, receiving 86 percent of the vote.

== General election ==
=== Candidates ===
- Francis Suarez, City Commissioner
- Cynthia Jaquith, Socialist Workers Party activist
- Williams Armbrister, former utility foreman, perennial candidate
- Christian Canache, businessman

=== Results ===
2017 Miami mayoral election results
Party	Candidate	Votes	%
Nonpartisan	Francis Suarez	21,856	85.81
Nonpartisan	Cynthia Jaquith	1,394	5.47
Nonpartisan	Williams Armbrister	1,392	5.47
Nonpartisan	Christian Canache	829	3.25
Total votes		25,471	100
