= Zipcar =

American car-sharing brand

- Type: Subsidiary
- Traded as: Nasdaq: ZIP
- Industry: Car sharing
- Founded: January 2000; 26 years ago, in Cambridge, Massachusetts, U.S.
- Founder: Antje Danielson; Robin Chase
- Headquarters: Boston, Massachusetts, U.S.
- Area served: Urban areas and college campuses throughout the United States, Canada, Costa Rica, Iceland, Taiwan, Turkey, and the United Kingdom
- Key people: Angelo Adams (president)
- Services: Car sharing
- Number of employees: Over 500
- Parent: Avis Budget Group
- Website: zipcar.com

Zipcar is an American car-sharing company and a subsidiary of Avis Budget Group. Zipcar gives members access to book cars nearby by the hour or day. Members may have to pay a monthly or annual membership fee in addition to car reservations charges. Gas, maintenance, insurance options, and a dedicated parking spot are included. Zipcar was founded in 2000 by Antje Danielson and Robin Chase.

In the third quarter of 2007, Zipcar merged with Seattle-based rival Flexcar to create a nationwide car rental company. The company's IPO was in April 2011. Zipcar common stock traded on Nasdaq under the ticker symbol "ZIP" until it was acquired by Avis in 2013.

On March 14, 2013, Avis Budget Group acquired Zipcar for approximately US$500 million. Scott Griffith, who had run the company for the previous decade, resigned the day after the acquisition closed and passed the reins to a new company president, Mark Norman. In early 2014, Kaye Ceille took over as Zipcar's North American president. In the summer of 2016, Ceille became a managing director of Avis Budget Group International and in 2017, Tracey Zhen was appointed as president. Angelo Adams was announced as the head of Zipcar in 2022.

In September 2016, Zipcar announced that it had 1 million members across 500 cities in nine countries, with nearly 10,000 vehicles. Members can instantly join and reserve vehicles via Zipcar's Android or iPhone mobile app or online and, once approved, immediately book Zipcars up to a year in advance. Zipcar members have 24/7 on-demand access to the cars by enabling Bluetooth on their Zipcar mobile app or, if needed, an access card which unlocks the door; the keys are already located inside. Members can also use Zipcar's app to search, book and locate a Zipcar by honking its horn, extend, end and cancel a reservation.

== History ==
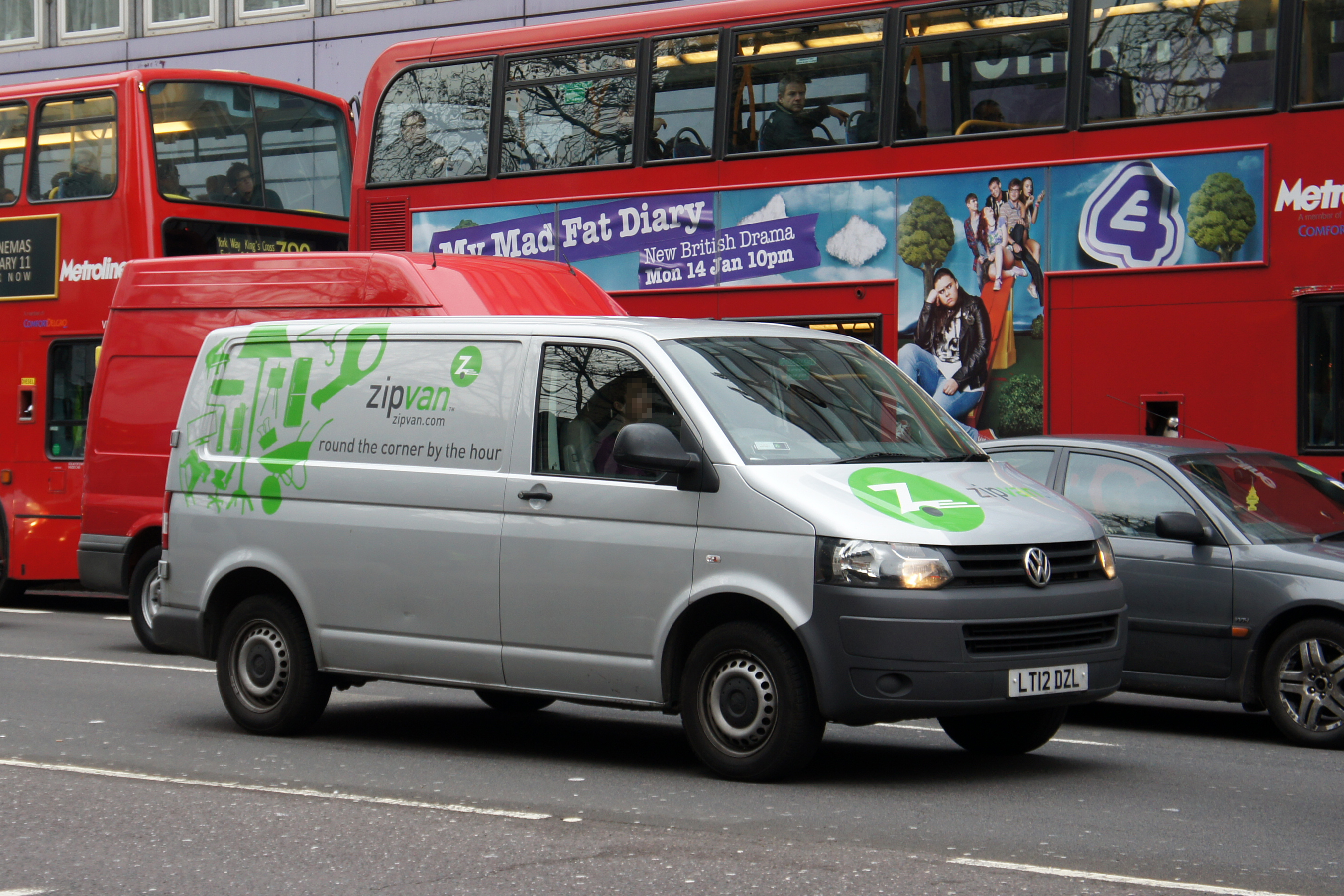
Zipvan vehicle in London

Zipcar was co-founded by Antje Danielson and Robin Chase based on German and Swiss company precedents in January 2000. In June 2000, the first Zipcars hit the road around Boston, Massachusetts. In January 2001, Danielson was fired after Chase petitioned Zipcar's board for the ability to make hiring and firing decisions without consulting them.

In September 2001, the Washington, D.C. office opened, with the branch in New York City following in February 2002. In February 2003, after difficulties in securing additional rounds of funding, the Zipcar board replaced Robin Chase as CEO with Scott Griffith. In July 2005, Zipcar secured $10 million in funding led by Benchmark Capital. In August 2005, San Francisco office opened. In May 2006, the Toronto office opened. In May 2006, General Electric's Commercial Finance Fleet Services (NYSE: GE) gave Zipcar $20 million in lease line financing. In September 2006, the Toronto market was named the fastest growing new market in company history.

In November 2006, the London office opened. In April 2007, the Vancouver office opened. In October 2007, Zipcar and Flexcar executives announced a merger of the two companies, with the Zipcar brand and headquarters replacing that of Flexcar.

On January 23, 2008, the merged Zipcar/Flexcar canceled service for the Southern California cities of Los Angeles and San Diego without providing advance notice to customers in those areas, although Southern California college operations were left intact. On July 11, 2008, Zipcar announced it doubled membership in past year, including the Flexcar members it acquired, and now had 225,000 members. On August 28, 2008, Rice University announced its introduction into the program in their goal of achieving the lowest possible carbon footprint while providing additional transportation options for employees that carpool. In June 2009, the company announced an iPhone application at the Apple World Wide Developer Conference; the application is capable of honking the horn and unlocking some Zipcars.

Following impressive third-quarter results, previous CEO Scott Griffith announced that 2012 would mark Zipcar's "first full year of profitability on a US GAAP basis". Scott Griffith stepped down on March 15, 2013, following Avis Budget Group's acquisition of Zipcar. Mark Norman remained as president until February 2014, when Avis Budget Group announced that Kaye Ceille was appointed president of Zipcar, and "Mark Norman would step down in order to pursue another career opportunity." In July 2016, Kay Ceille stepped down as president of Zipcar to become the managing director of Avis Budget Group International, Australia. On January 5, 2017, Zipcar announced that after a 6-month search they appointed Tracey Zhen as its new president. Zhen came over from TripAdvisor where she had been a vice president and general manager.

Zipcar saw a significant swing in demand during the COVID-19 pandemic, with a falloff in demand in March 2020 and a surge in May. Having taken cars off the road, the company had trouble keeping up with demand, causing a backlog at the customer service center. Some customers arrived at the time of their reservation to find no car in the parking spot. Some customers reported being stranded without transportation and unable to reach customer service to complain or cancel their membership. President Tracey Zhen apologized in June, saying the company was adding cars and customer service employees. By that month, she reported membership applications in New York City 70% above June 2019. An anonymous employee told CNN that the problems were exacerbated by laying off more than 20% of its employees, and changing call centers.

On September 27, 2022, Zipcar announced Angelo Adams as its new head of Zipcar.

On December 1, 2025, Zipcar sent an email to its members announcing that it is proposing to cease its UK operations, with service suspended from the start of January 2026 pending the outcome of its employee redundancy consultation.

== Membership ==
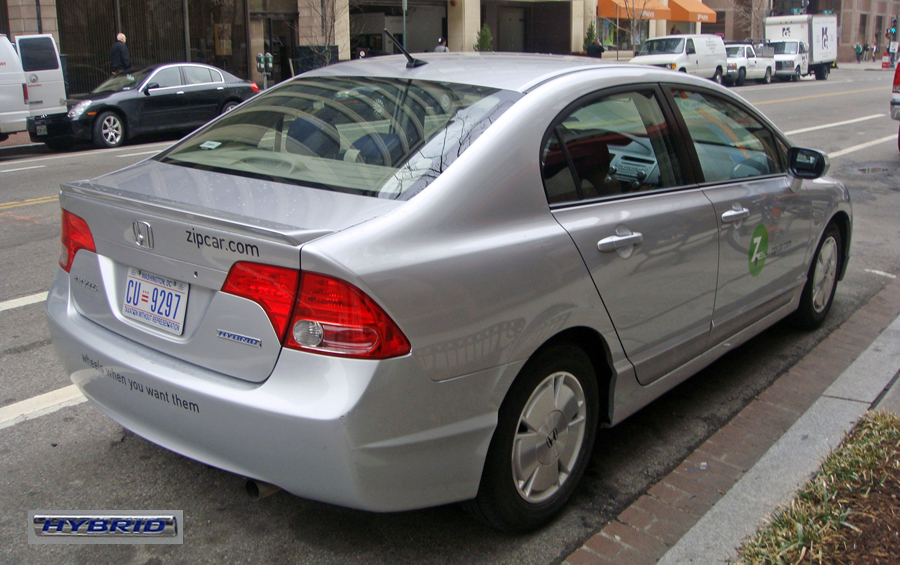
The Honda Civic Hybrid is part of Zipcar's clean fuel vehicle fleet.

Members are able to view vehicle availability and reserve a self-service car via the internet, Android, and iPhone apps, or by telephone, in increments as short as 30 minutes. Members pay only for time they reserve. Zipcar vehicles report their positions to a control center using in-car technology.

In the U.S., each reservation entitles members up to 180 miles (290 km) for a 24-hour period and then $0.45 per mile beyond 180 miles ($0.55 per mile for premium vehicles and cargo van rentals) will be charged within the 24 hour period. If the rental is longer than 24 hours, then the member is entitled to 180 miles (290 km) per 24 hours; then 20 miles (32 km) per additional hour of the reservation period until 180 miles (290 km) is reached. If the 180 mile limit based on hours is exceeded then $0.45 per mile will be charged ($0.55 per mile for premium vehicles and cargo van rentals).

Canadian members receive up to 200 kilometres (120 mi) with each reservation for the first 24 hours with $0.30 per kilometer (up to $0.45 per kilometer for premium vehicles and cargo van rentals) being charged if the 200 km limit is exceeded. If the rental reservation is longer than 24 hours, then 200 kilometres (120 mi) is included per 24 hours period along with 15 kilometres (9.3 mi) per each additional hour up to 200 kilometres (120 mi). If the 200 km limit based on hours is exceeded, then $0.30 per kilometer (up to $0.45 per kilometer for premium vehicles and cargo van rentals) will be charged. Individual members can sign up for one of two different plans, the "Occasional Driving Plan" and the "Extra Value Plan".

A member's Zipcar reservation includes vehicle insurance and a gas card for the car. A member can reserve and use a Zipcar in any Zipcar city.

== Fees ==
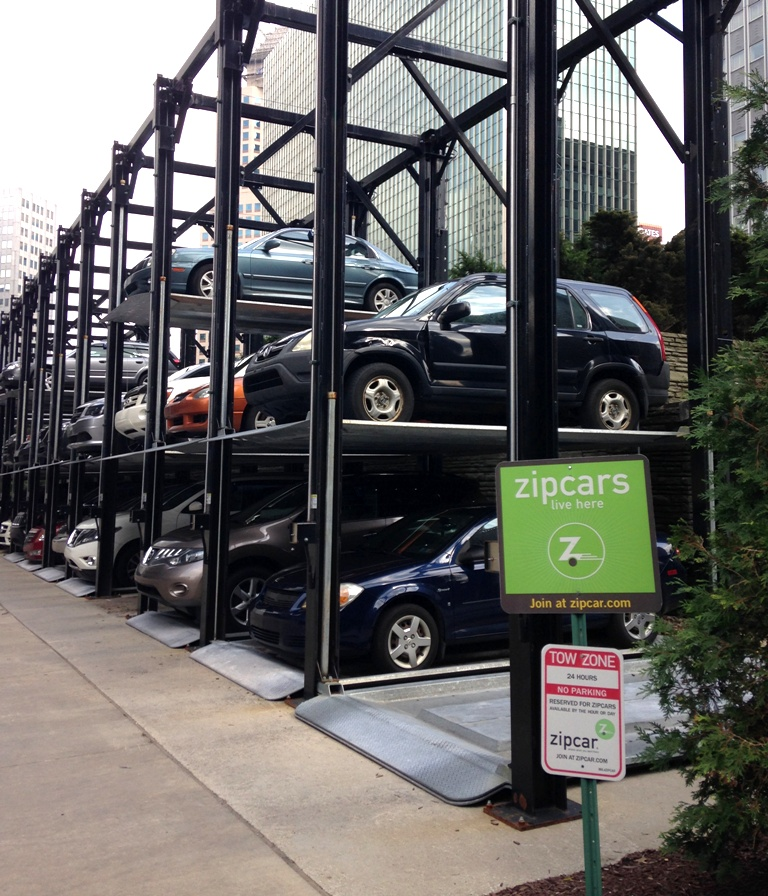
Zipcar parking in Pittsburgh

Zipcar was sued in 2009 and again in 2011 by customers alleging that they charged excessive or hidden fees. The suit cited several hidden charges, including a charge to talk to a customer service representative even when customers call to report a problem that cannot be handled through the website or automated phone system, additional fees on top of the cost of a parking ticket even if the ticket was overturned in court, late fees starting at $50, a fee to retrieve items left in cars, and an inactivity fee. According to the complaint, many customers may not even be aware of the charges because Zipcar does not send monthly statements. The lawsuit was dismissed in 2010, after U.S. District Judge Nathaniel M. Gorton found that every penalty except an inactive-user charge is legal.

In August 2016, Zipcar agreed to settle a case involving allegations of charging New York consumers illegal damage fees for rental vehicles. According to New York Attorney General Eric T. Schneiderman, New York State law mandates if rental car companies mean to pursue charges for damages to their vehicles, they must give consumers the opportunity to dispute the complaint. Schneiderman's office alleges Zipcar failed to follow this requirement. The company sometimes purportedly charged consumers damage fees before notifying them of the charges. As a settlement, Zipcar will refund any damage charges assessed against consumers who disputed their responsibility for the damage. Additionally, the company will pay the Attorney General's Office $35,000 for fees and costs. In addition, Zipcar is barred from charging customers for damage unless those customers agree they are liable or the company obtains a legal determination—for example, from a court—that the driver is responsible. As of September 25, 2018, the business is not accredited by the Better Business Bureau and averages a one-star review from the BBB from numerous complaints alleging deceptive business practices.

== University, organization and business partnerships ==
Zipcar launched its Zipcar for Business program in early 2004 to provide companies with discounts on Monday-Friday driving. Since the launch of the program, Zipcar has signed 10,000 small, medium, and large sized businesses, as companies are increasingly adopting Zipcar's on demand car rental model as a cost-saving alternative for employee travel. Zipcar has partnered with over 600 colleges and universities across North America.

== Zipcar fleet ==
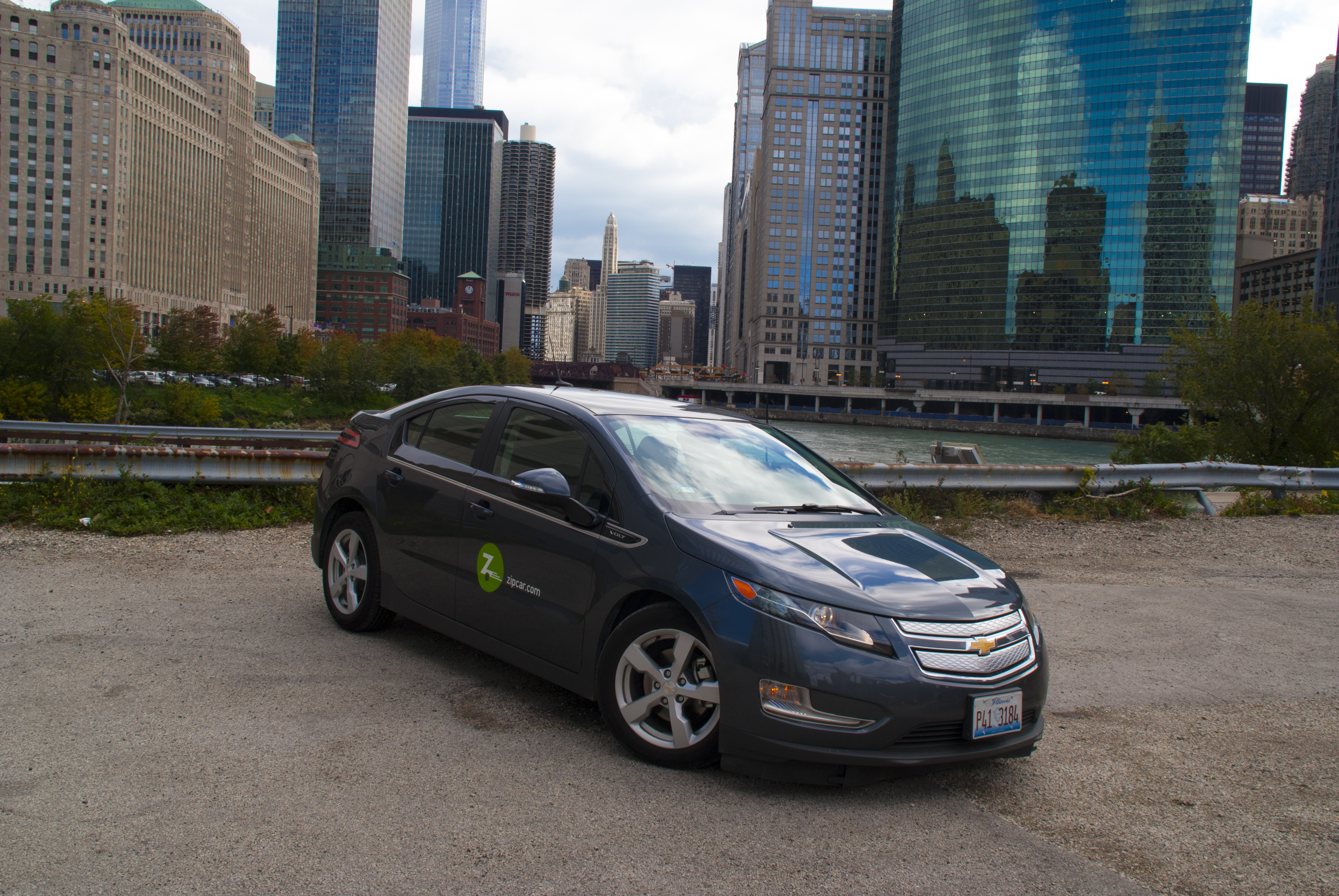
The Chevrolet Volt Plug-in hybrid was available to Zipcar members in Chicago in 2012.

Zipcar offers more than 50 makes and models of vehicles. Each vehicle has a home location: a reserved parking space located on a street, driveway, or neighborhood parking lot in the member's area, to which it must be returned at the end of the reservation. The locations of all Zipcars and models available at those locations are available at the Zipcar website. Zipcar currently (2019) has a fleet of 12,000+ vehicles. The makes and models of Zipcar vehicles available vary by location (for example, on college campuses, most Zipcar vehicles are economy, hybrid, and full-size cars), though members are able to choose the exact make and model of vehicle they wish from the list of available vehicles online or in the Zipcar smartphone application.

Most Zipcar vehicles will feature decals with the Zipcar logo. Each vehicle has a "name" that help the renter to identify their specific vehicle. Zipcar offers vehicles in different categories, such as economy cars, electric vehicles (EV's), hybrid vehicles, full-size cars, luxury vehicles (such as those from Audi, BMW, Mercedes-Benz, and other luxury manufacturers), SUV's, pickup trucks, and cargo vans. A Zipcar vehicle will not unlock for the renter until their exact reservation time. Renters unlock their vehicle (both at the beginning of the reservation and throughout the rental) by either holding their Zipcar membership Radio Frequency Identification RFID card or smartphone against the upper corner of the vehicle's windshield. The vehicle's keys are always tied to the steering column of the vehicle, and stay inside the vehicle at all times. A Zipcar "Copilot" guide is located in the driver's side sun visor, and includes a complimentary refueling card (gasoline card), insurance information, the vehicle registration card, and information about both the vehicle, as well as rental policies and procedures.

=== Embedded technologies ===
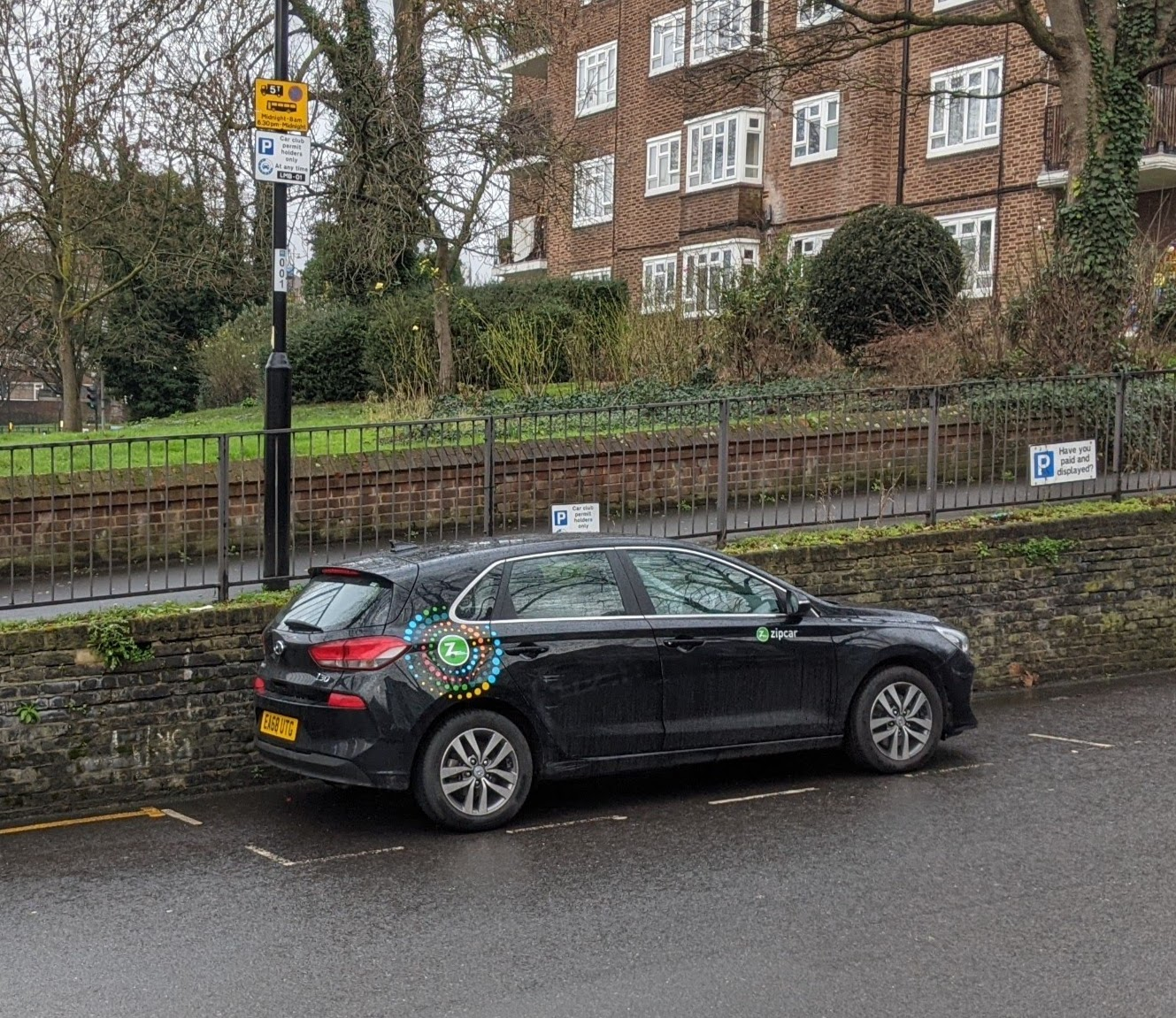
A Zipcar vehicle in a dedicated parking bay in Lewisham, London

Zipcars have RFID readers located on the windshield that communicates with the card to lock and unlock the doors of the vehicle. Each vehicle records hours of usage and mileage, which is uploaded to a central computer via a wireless data link. The location of the vehicles is not tracked during a reservation for privacy reasons but is trackable, and all cars are equipped with a "kill" function that allows the company to prevent the car from starting in the event of theft. Zipcar also offers the embedded Information Technologies it has installed in its fleet as a fleet optimization service through its FastFleet service.

During a rental, a Zipcar member can interface with their rented vehicle using the Zipcar smartphone app, which includes the ability to locate the vehicle in a parking lot (including GPS location and the ability to sound the vehicle's horn and flash the lights) and unlock or lock the vehicle.

=== Clean fuel vehicles ===
Among its fleet of fuel-efficient vehicles, and through an agreement between Honda and Zipcar, the program offers clean fuel and low-emission vehicles that include the Insight hybrid, Civic Hybrid, and Honda Fit EV all-electric car. Vehicles such as the Toyota Prius are also available.

=== Zipcar Flex ===
In the United Kingdom, some vehicles are branded "Zipcar Flex" which means that they can be left anywhere within a designated zone, rather than in a specific parking space. The remaining vehicles are branded "Zipcar Roundtrip".

=== Common vehicles in the Zipcar fleet ===
==== Sedan ====
- Chevrolet Malibu
- Ford Fiesta
- Ford Focus
- Honda Civic
- Honda Fit
- Hyundai Elantra
- Kia Forte
- Nissan Sentra
- Subaru Impreza
- Toyota Corolla
- Volkswagen Jetta

==== Hatchback ====
- Ford Fiesta
- Honda Civic
- Kia Soul
- Mazda3
- Subaru Impreza
- Volkswagen Golf

==== Luxury ====
- BMW X3
- Mercedes-Benz C-Class
- Mercedes-Benz GLC

==== SUV ====
- Ford Edge
- Ford Escape
- Honda CR-V
- Honda HR-V
- Hyundai Santa Fe
- Jeep Wrangler
- Kia Sorento
- Kia Sportage
- Mazda CX-5
- Mitsubishi Outlander
- Nissan Rogue
- Subaru Crosstrek
- Toyota 4Runner
- Toyota RAV4

==== Pickup truck ====
- Nissan Frontier

==== Minivan ====
- Dodge Grand Caravan
- Honda Odyssey
- Toyota Sienna

==== Cargo van ====
- Ford Transit

== Expansion ==
On October 31, 2007, Zipcar and Flexcar announced their intentions to merge. The merged company retained the name "Zipcar" and was headquartered in Cambridge, Massachusetts. Zipcar's chief executive, former Seattle-based Boeing engineer Scott Griffith, became Chairman and CO, while Flexcar CEO Mark Norman became president and Chief Operating Officer. The merger combined Zipcar's fleet of 3,500 vehicles in 35 markets with Flexcar's 1,500 cars in 15 markets.

In December 2009, Zipcar announced their participation in a round of financing with Avancar, the largest on-demand car rental company in Spain, based in Barcelona. Under the terms of the agreement, Zipcar acquired a minority interest in Avancar, a Zipcar executive joined Avancar's board and Zipcar was given a year option to increase the company's ownership stake. Later on in April 2010, Zipcar announced that it had acquired London-based car-sharing club Streetcar.

In December 2010, Zipcar extended their option for another year through the end of 2011, and provided a monetary loan to Avancar, which is convertible into equity if Zipcar chooses to exercise the option. On October 17, 2012, Zipcar announced the completion of its Avancar integration.

Since 2014, Zipcar has started services in cities in North America, Europe, and Asia.

== Contraction ==
Operations in the UK are closing down over 2024-26, leaving Oxford, Cambridge, Bristol and London.

== Insurance ==
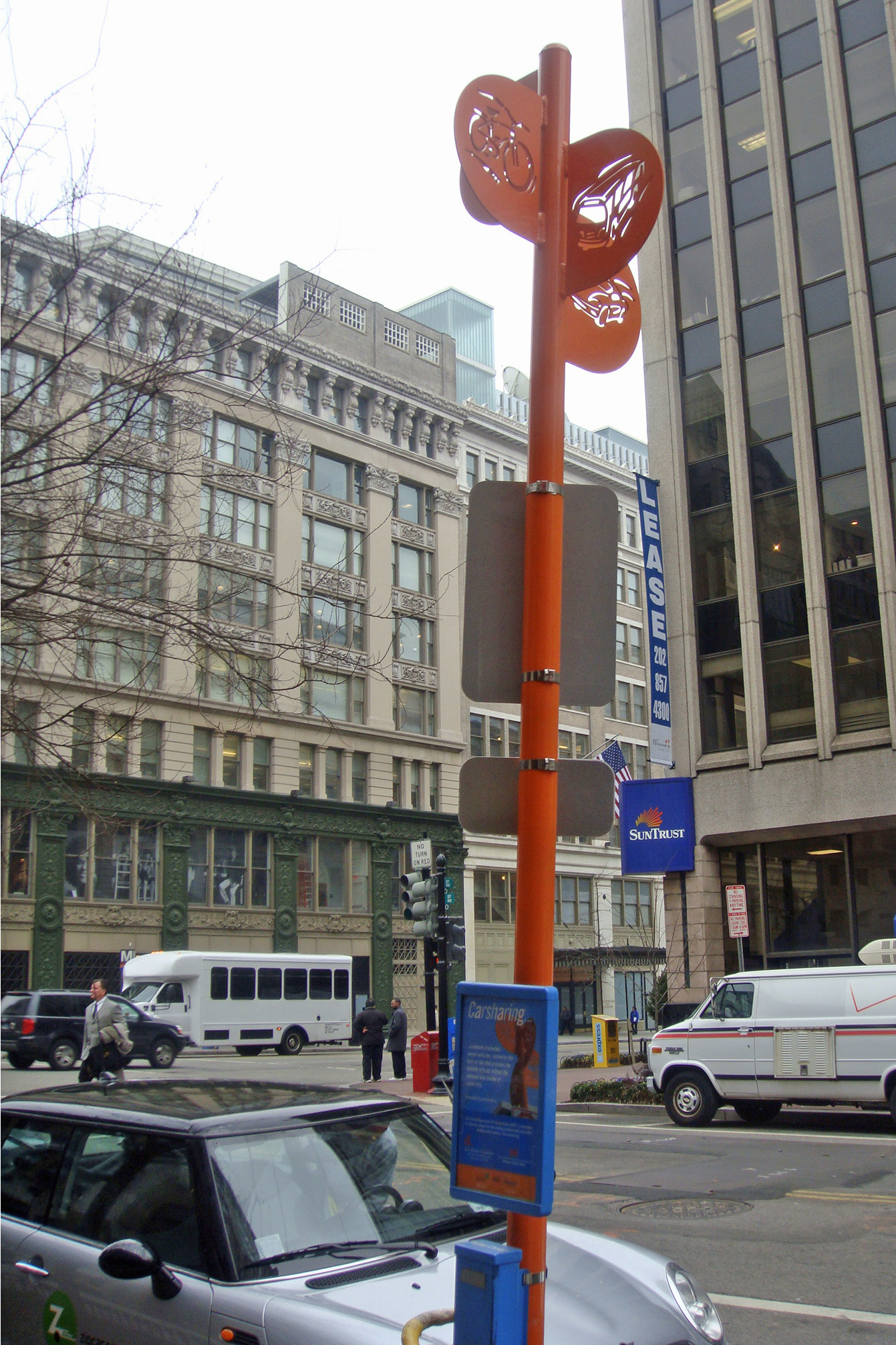
Zipcar drop off/pick up area in downtown Washington, D.C.

Zipcar provides liability coverage of $100,000 bodily injury per person, $300,000 bodily injury maximum, and $25,000 property damage per accident for members over 21 years of age who joined after March 1, 2015. Members at fault are responsible for the first $1,000 of costs related to the repair, recovery, and loss of use of any Zipcar vehicle. However, members can purchase no-liability insurance for an additional $79 a year. Members involved in accidents where fault is not determined (such as in a hit and run) must pay the first $1000 of these costs. For members under 21, Zipcar provides insurance coverage at state-mandated levels.

Zipcar has received some scrutiny for low coverage limits.

Insurance coverage may vary depending on the region of use. For example, Canadian members in Toronto, Ontario, are provided with $1 million in liability coverage. Vancouver, BC members are provided with $2 million in liability coverage. Both regions in Canada also include comprehensive and collision coverage in addition to liability insurance. Previously, Zipcars traveling into Canada from the U.S. required members to obtain a special insurance card from Zipcar. As of February 2018, however, it appears that this is no longer the policy. Canadian Zipcars traveling into the U.S. do not need the extra insurance card.

Similar to members of Zipcar U.S., members of Zipcar London, UK, require a special "vehicle on-hire" certificate when traveling abroad, which can be obtained from Zipcar.

== See also ==
- Carsharing
- Hertz 24/7
- Plug-in electric vehicles in California
- Sharing economy
- Turo
