= Flexcar =

Vehicle subscription company based in Boston, Massachusetts, US

- Industry: Vehicle subscription, Car sharing
- Founded: 2000
- Headquarters: Boston
- Website: flexcar.com

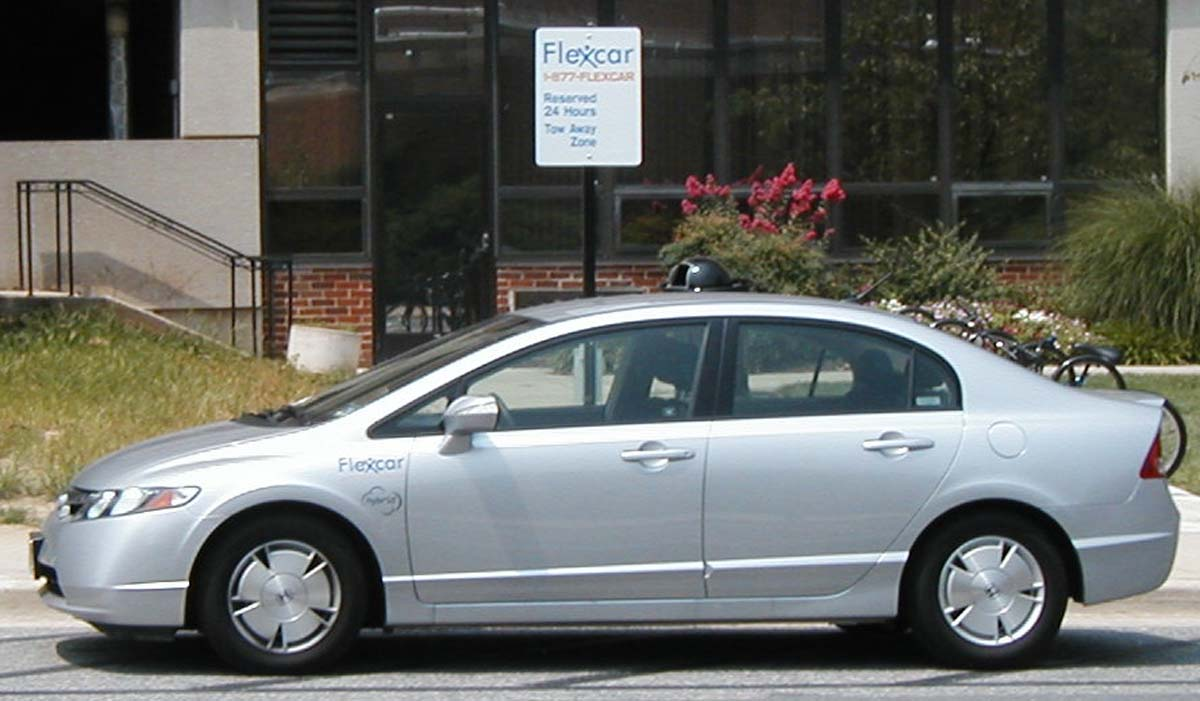
A Flexcar-owned Honda Civic Hybrid in its reserved parking spot in 2006

Flexcar is an American vehicle subscription company with headquarters located in Boston, Massachusetts.

== History ==
In January 2000, the Flexcar service was launched to 100 members served by four cars in the Capitol Hill neighborhood of Seattle. The company targeted drivers who made occasional use of a vehicle as well as drivers who wanted occasional access to a vehicle of a different type than they use day-to-day.

In several of its cities, the company had formed a public–private partnership with local public transit entities. For example, in Seattle, they were partnered with King County Metro Transit, which operates the area's buses.

In April 2001, Flexcar became the first car-sharing company in the U.S. to expand to a second city by acquiring CarSharing Portland in Portland. At the time, Flexcar's customer base in Seattle included over 1300 members sharing 40 cars. Carsharing Portland, which began business in March 1998, had at the time of its acquisition over 500 members with 25 vehicles in and around downtown Portland.

The company also started an initiative to convince Downtown Seattle employers to join their program as business members rather than maintaining their own fleet vehicles. Other market segments included placing vehicles at transit stations to provide "last mile" connectivity between transit and suburban office locations and providing subsidized vehicle access as part of low-income "jobs access" programs.

In August 2005, Revolution LLC, the holding company owned by Steve Case, founder of America Online, purchased a 60% holding interest in Flexcar. The company announced that this investment would lead to a rapid expansion of their operations.

In January 2007, Flexcar changed their billing structure of their hourly rentals. These changes replaced their flat fee for a variable pricing plan, which calculated cost on peak and non-peak hours with mileage limited to 150 miles per day. Members were notified on the organization's website and by letter that, "[v]ariable pricing provides two benefits. Members with flexible schedules can now save money by reserving the car during its 'off-peak' time, in this case, on the weekend. Because some members will shift their trips to 'off-peak' times, the car's availability should also improve during its 'peak' times as well."

On October 30, 2007, Flexcar executives announced a merger with car-sharing rival Zipcar. The merger consolidated the operations of the two corporations. Executives from both companies, in the announcement of the merger, stated that the Flexcar headquarters in Seattle would be closed, possibly resulting in the loss of jobs as operations transferred to Zipcar's headquarters in Boston.

In 2023, Flexcar opened a facility in Charlotte. The company also announced an expansion in Massachusetts and new monthly car plans.

In 2024, Flexcar expanded into Rhode Island.

In 2025, Flexcar announced a new headquarters in Boston, and Flexcar members surpassed 200 million miles driven in Flexcars.

In 2026, Flexcar opened two new locations in Atlanta. The company also surpassed 300 million miles driven, expanded to the West Coast with locations in San Jose and Richmond, California, and opened its first location in New York and Texas.

== See also ==
- Transportation in Seattle
- Transportation in Portland, Oregon
- Transportation in Los Angeles
