= Streetcar (carsharing) =

Carsharing operator

- Company type: Corporation
- Industry: Car rental
- Founded: 2004
- Founders: Brett Akker, Andrew Valentine
- Defunct: 2010
- Fate: Acquired by Zipcar in 2010
- Successor: Zipcar
- Headquarters: United Kingdom
- Services: Car sharing
- Website: www.streetcar.co.uk

Streetcar was the largest carsharing/car club company in the United Kingdom, established in 2004, which merged with the American company Zipcar in 2010, following a period of investment by Smedvig Capital.

Streetcar vehicles were parked in a dense network of dedicated spaces primarily in London, but also across a total of 10 UK cities including Brighton, Bristol, Cambridge, Edinburgh, Glasgow, Oxford, Guildford, Maidstone and Southampton. Members could book vehicles from 30 minutes up to six months, online or by phone. A smartcard was used to pick up and return the car at any time.

== History ==
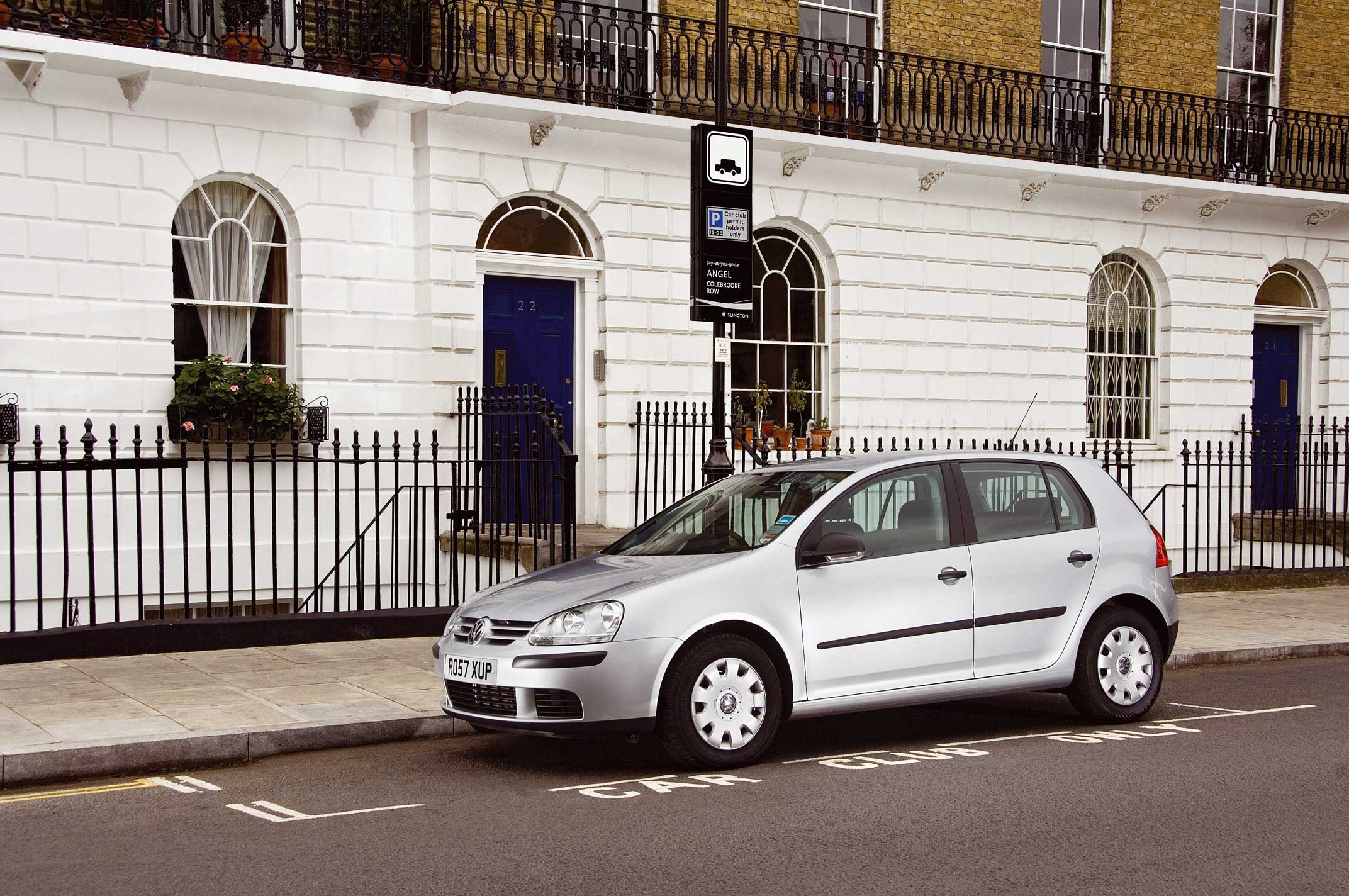
A Streetcar in London.

Durham University friends Brett Akker and Andrew Valentine founded Streetcar in April 2004 after seeing its commercial success in Europe and North America. They started with 8 cars in locations near Clapham Junction station, and much of the growth since inception has occurred organically through word-of-mouth recommendations. In March 2007, Streetcar took on £6.4m from Smedvig Capital - an investment which saw Trevor Chinn come on board as chairman.

The Streetcar fleet consisted of VW Golfs, VW Polos, VW Transporter vans and VW Tourans. From January 2010, Streetcar also introduced the BMW 1 Series and BMW 3 Series to their fleet. The BMW models Streetcar chose, the 116d, 118d and 318d

In June 2009, Streetcar became the first UK car club to provide an electric car (Toyota Prius) to its members, as part of a trial with Camden Council.

In January 2010, the company launched their own iPhone application, allowing members across the UK to locate, book and unlock a car using their iPhone or iPod touch.

Streetcar had over 1,200 locations across 10 UK cities including; London, Edinburgh, Glasgow, Bristol, Cambridge, Oxford, Brighton, Southampton, Guildford, and Maidstone.

Following the 2010 merger with Zipcar, the fleet merged under the Zipcar brand and the in-vehicle technology was combined to provide membership of both companies access to more than 1,000 vehicles around England, as well as international access to vehicles in Zipcar's existing markets across the United States, and Canada. The merger plan resulted in a request from the Office of Fair Trading for an enquiry by the British Competition Commission, as a merger would mean that the combined company would control 80-90% of the UK market, but the merger was cleared on 22 December 2010.

== Membership details ==
Streetcars were booked online or by phone, and could be collected and returned at any time using the member's personal smart card and PIN. Usage charges were based on the length of time the client kept the car, and mileage during the rental (the first 20 miles per calendar day were free); currently ZipCar offers 40 free miles per day. In June 2009 Streetcar announced that members would no longer have to pay London's congestion charge. For car bookings over 72 hours the cost of fuel was included (up to a fair use limit of 500 miles per week, excluding peak weekends; this did not apply in July and August). For bookings shorter than 72 hours, 20 miles' free fuel was provided per calendar day, after which additional mileage was charged at 22p per mile. On 1 March 2011, Streetcar announced that their Overnight Rate would become a permanent feature, after previously being a limited offer. With this, members could book a Streetcar or Streetvan from 6pm to 9am, Monday to Thursday, for £25.

Membership of Streetcar used to cost £59.50 per year, with cars available from £5.25 per hour. Since its merger with Zipcar in 2010, the membership fee has stayed the same but the cost per hour has decreased slightly to £5 for midweek and increased to £6 for weekends.

== Streetcar for Business ==
In 2008, Streetcar launched "Streetcar for Business" as a result of its developing relationship with companies across the UK, and in recognition of the differing needs of businesses and individuals. Business accounts (which cost £99 annually ex VAT) provided employees with access to every vehicle in the Streetcar fleet, with the option to add drivers to the account for a one-off charge of £10 each. The service was used as an example of a practical and green alternative to grey fleets or reimbursed private mileage.

Over 2,000 businesses were registered members of Streetcar for Business, with corporate clients of the pay-as-you-go scheme include Kellogg’s, as well as local government authorities including Surrey County Council.

== Streetvan ==
In July 2008, Streetcar launched Streetvan, in conjunction with Homebase and Big Yellow Self Storage. Streetvan membership cost £19.50 per year, and provided members with access to every van in the fleet. All vehicles are VW Transporter vans, and are available for £8.95 per hour. Following the merger this service became Zipvan.

== Environmental and financial benefits ==
Research by Transport for London showed that each Streetcar took some 26 cars off the roads for every one club car put on the road. Research also showed that using carsharing clubs such as Streetcar can have financial benefits. According to the government-sponsored website carclubs.org.uk, car owners who drove less than 6,000 miles a year could save up to £3,500.

== See also ==
- Transport in the United Kingdom
