= 2021 Miami mayoral election =

- November 2, 2021
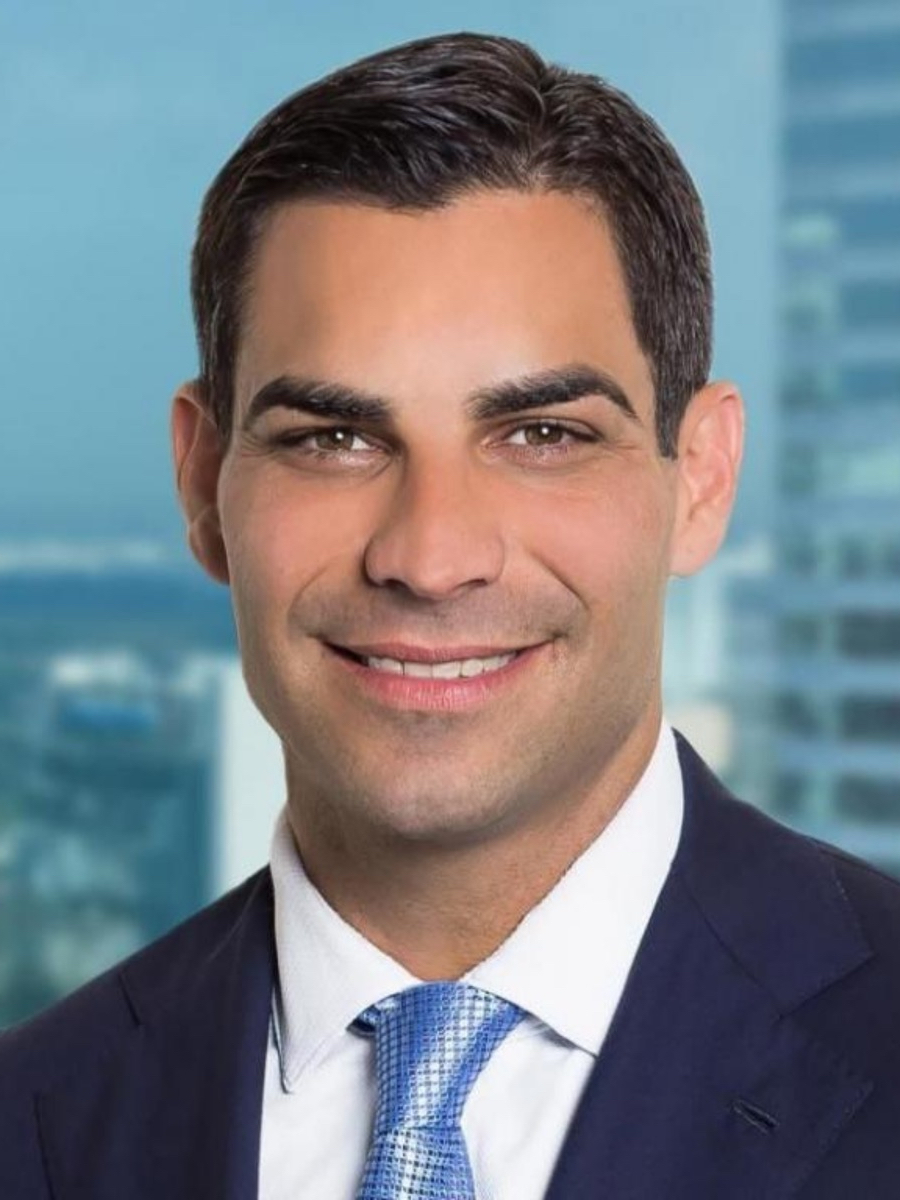

| Candidate | Francis Suarez | Max Martínez |
| Popular vote | 21,485 | 3,167 |
| Percentage | 78.61% | 11.59% |
- Results by precinct Suarez: 60–70% 70–80% 80–90% >90% Martinez: 40–50% Exantus: >90% Tie: 50% No data
Mayor before election
Francis Suarez
Republican
Elected Mayor
Francis Suarez
Republican

The 2021 Miami mayoral election took place on November 2, 2021. Incumbent Mayor Francis Suarez ran for re-election to a second term. He faced four little-known opponents, and was a clear favorite to win re-election, significantly outraising and outspending his opponents during the campaign. The Miami Herald reluctantly endorsed him for re-election, criticizing him for his role in the firing of Police Chief Art Acevedo and suggesting that City Commissioner Joe Carollo, a former Mayor, was "functioning as the de facto mayor." Suarez ultimately won re-election in a landslide, winning 79 percent of the vote.

== General election ==
=== Candidates ===
- Francis Suarez, incumbent Mayor
- Max Martínez, digital sports show and podcast producer
- Marie Exantus, University of Miami student, former call center representative
- Anthony Dutrow
- Frank Pichel, private investigator

==== Disqualified ====
- Mayra Joli, (Note: disqualified for not being a Miami resident, as Joli's primary residence was in Coral Gables, Florida) attorney and independent candidate for U.S. Congress in 2018

=== Results ===
2021 Miami mayoral election
| Party | Candidate | Votes | % |
|---|---|---|---|
| Nonpartisan | Francis Suarez (incumbent) | 21,485 | 78.61 |
| Nonpartisan | Max Martínez | 3,167 | 11.59 |
| Nonpartisan | Marie Exantus | 1,187 | 4.34 |
| Nonpartisan | Anthony Dutrow | 1,009 | 3.69 |
| Nonpartisan | Frank Pichel | 482 | 1.76 |
| Total votes | | 27,330 | 100 |
