= Nexar =

American vehicle-to-vehicle network provider

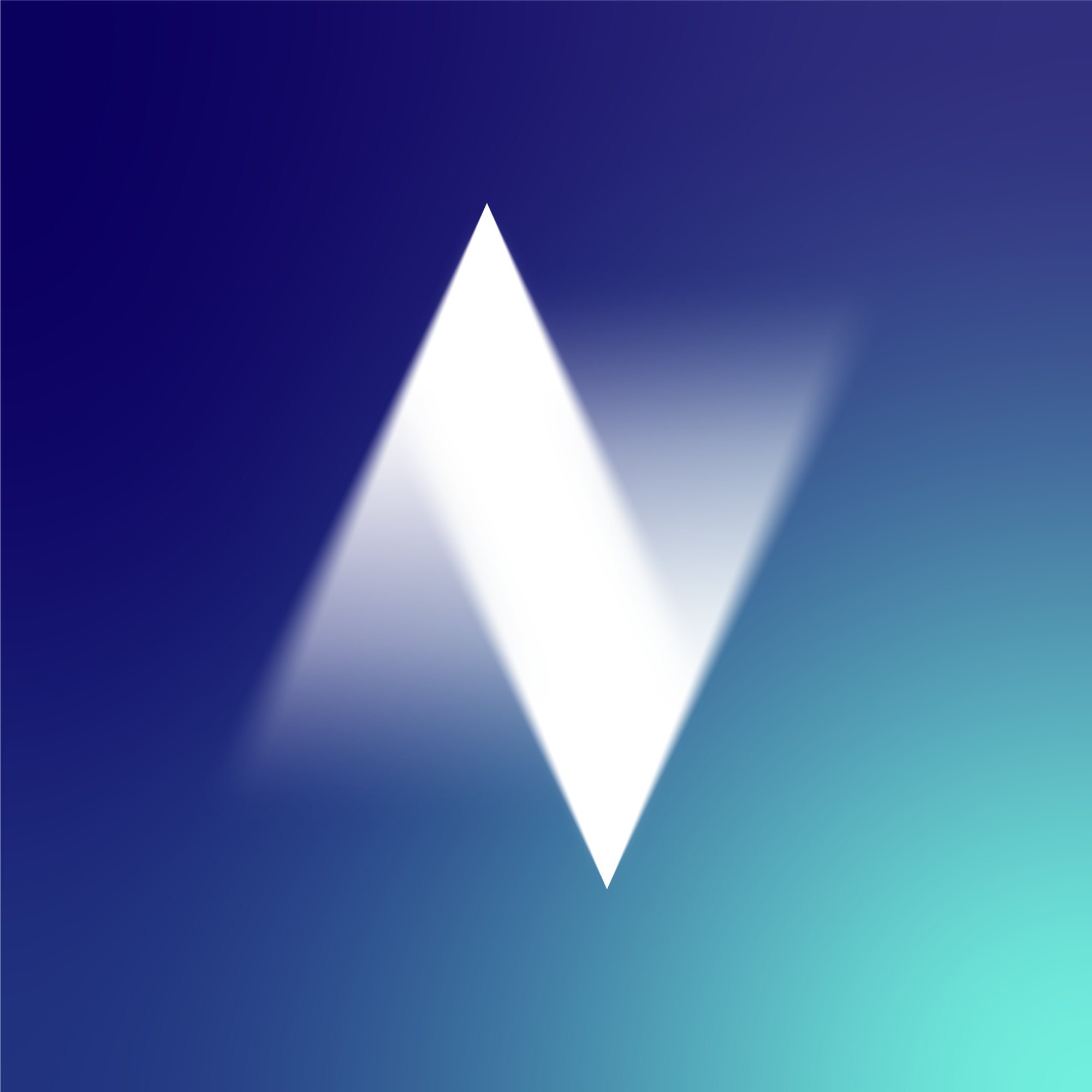
- Type: Company
- Industry: Software development
- Founded: 2015
- Founders: Eran Shir, Bruno Fernandez-Ruiz
- Headquarters: New York, US
- Website: nexar.com

Nexar is a provider of a vehicle-to-vehicle (V2V) network for preventing road collisions and enabling autonomous mobility.

Nexar's technology is being used by the public sector, autonomous vehicle makers, OEMs, fleets, and insurance companies. The company's products are designed to improve driving safety and efficiency by using the machine learning and computer vision. Nexar's technology enables drivers to capture high-quality video footage of their journeys, which can then be analyzed to provide valuable insights into driving behavior and road conditions.

One of the key features of Nexar's dashcams is an app connection from which Nexar can aggregate data and use it for the development of applications for driving and road safety. By anonymously aggregating drivers' dashcam data, Nexar has been able to develop several vision-based data services. Target customers for these products include autonomous vehicle (AV) developers and original equipment manufacturers (OEMs), as well as fleets and insurance providers.

These data services may be used to identify patterns in driving behavior, detect potential safety hazards on the road, and provide real-time information about traffic conditions. For example, Nexar's technology can detect and alert drivers to dangerous intersections or identify areas where road infrastructure improvements are needed. Additionally, the data collected by Nexar can be used to optimize traffic flow, reducing congestion and improving overall efficiency on the road.

== History ==
Nexar was founded in 2015 by Eran Shir and Bruno Fernandez-Ruiz, raising $4 million in its first funding round. The company released its first connected vehicle safety system in 2016, along with a free AI-powered dashcam app that builds a local database of drivers and roads to alert users to potential hazards in real time.

In 2016, the company secured $10.5 million in a Series A funding round and raised an undisclosed sum from PROOF Fund in January 2017. The same year, Nexar released CityStream, an app that generates digital maps based on real-time data from roads in specific locations.

The company joined the Automotive Edge Computing Consortium (AECC) in 2018. It announced an AI-based image retrieval method for localization in cities at the Computer Vision and Pattern Recognition Conference (CVPR) in 2019.

In 2020, Nexar completed a $52 million Series C financing round led by Corner Ventures - with participation from Samsung NEXT, La Maison, and Micron Ventures, among others.

In 2021, Nexar collaborated with Blyncsy, a data intelligence company from Utah, to improve road safety in California, Utah, and New Mexico by using dashcam footage and machine learning.

In August, Nexar acquired Veniam, a Portugal-based provider of intelligent networking for the internet of moving things.

On July 1, 2026, a joint announcement was released by Nexar and Nauto that both companies will merge.

== Products ==
Nexar's CityStream Virtual Cam is designed to streamline detecting and verifying road changes.

Nexar's CityStream Work Zones (Public sector) is designed for the public sector to address the challenges municipalities face in tracking and managing work zones within their cities.

Training Data Sets gather anonymized video data and reconstructions from predefined locations to utilize real-world scenarios instead of generic or artificial simulations and access a wide range of driving data that is frequently updated.

CityStream Road Inventory — technology that enables customers to retrieve data from the API for their desired region and compare it against their own map. In the event of any changes, customers can request an image to inspect and validate the alterations.

Nexar's CityStream Work Zones gives an API access to CityStream Work Zones, which allows customers to extract data from the API and integrate it into their routing algorithms. This integration prevents vehicles from being directed to locations where they may become stuck.
