= Bluebikes =

Bike sharing system in the Boston, Massachusetts metropolitan area

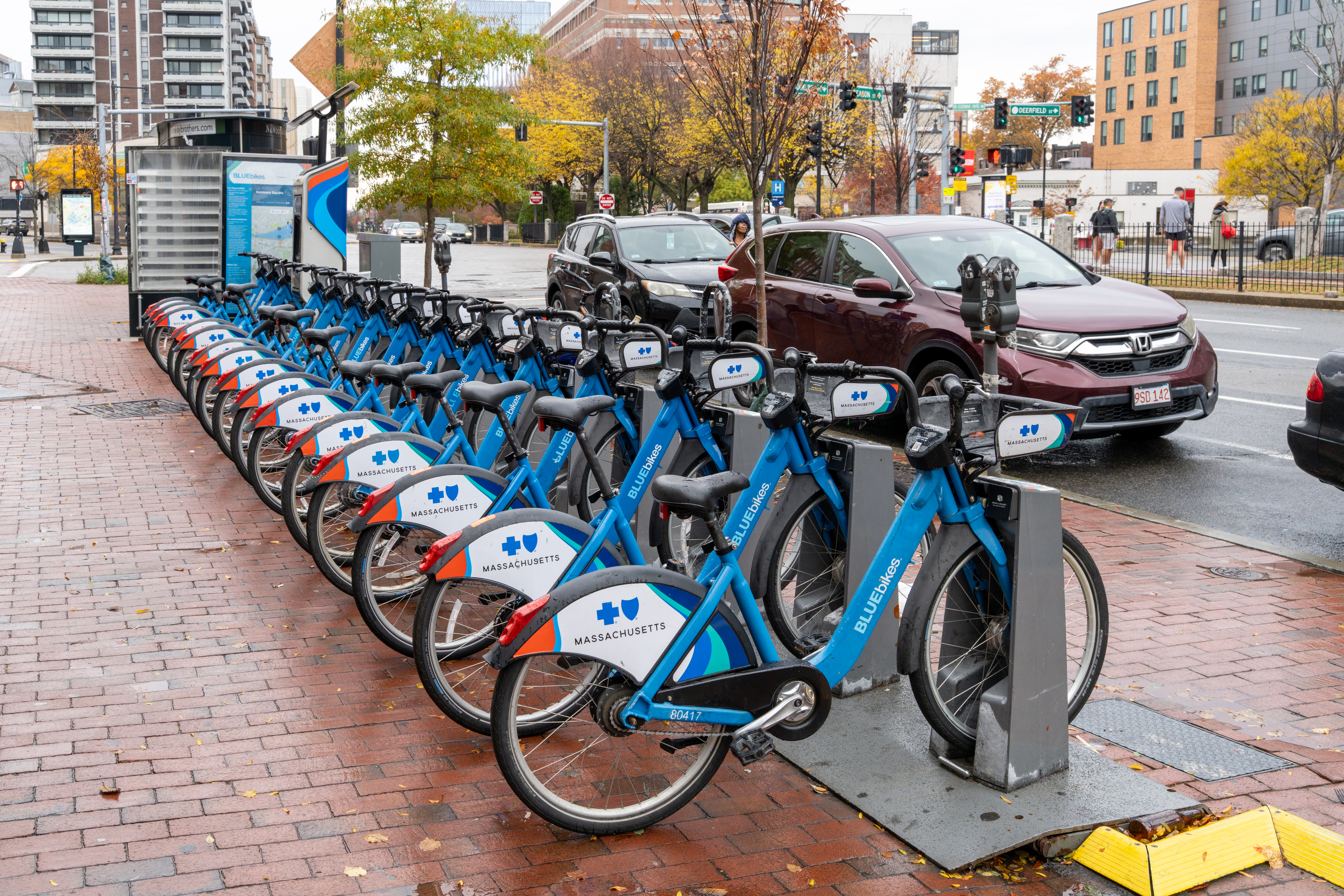
- Bluebikes at Kenmore Square, 2025

Overview
- Owner: The municipalities of Boston, Brookline, Cambridge, Everett, and Somerville, Newton, Arlington, Chelsea, Watertown, and Salem in Massachusetts
- Locale: Greater Boston, Massachusetts, U.S.
- Transit type: Bicycle-sharing system
- Number of stations: 520 (2024)
- Annual ridership: 4,734,042 (2024)
- Website: bluebikes.com

Operation
- Began operation: July 28, 2011; 15 years ago
- Operator: Motivate
- Number of vehicles: 5,500+ (2024)
Map of Bluebikes stations
Map

Bluebikes, originally Hubway, is a bicycle sharing system in the Boston metropolitan area. As of 2024, the system had deployed 520 stations with a fleet of over 5,500 bikes in the 10 municipalities it served. Bluebikes is operated by Motivate and uses technology provided by 8D Technologies and PBSC Urban Solutions for equipment. The bike share program officially launched in Boston as Hubway. From 2012 to 2021, neighboring municipalities of Brookline, Cambridge, Somerville, Everett, Newton, Arlington, Chelsea, Watertown, and Salem joined the system. By 2020, total annual members neared 23,000, and as of 2021, 14 million total rides have been taken.

In March 2018, the municipal owners announced a six-year marketing deal with Blue Cross Blue Shield of Massachusetts and relaunched under the name of Bluebikes. The name change took effect on May 9, 2018, with the release of the newly re-branded blue bicycles.

Users can rent out a Bluebike with the Bluebikes app or directly at the station's kiosk. Passes for purchase vary on length and cost, but income and non-income based subsidies are available.

== History ==
=== Initial launch ===
Logo of Hubway

On Earth Day, April 21, 2011, Boston Mayor Thomas Menino signed an operating contract with Alta Bicycle Share, officially announcing the launch of a bike share system in Boston. Planned as a regional system, Hubway was initiated under Mayor Menino's Boston Bikes Program, which aimed to build Boston into one of the world's premier cycling cities. The program was fully funded by $4.5 million in grants from the Federal Transit Administration and local organizations. Within the City of Boston, the system was sponsored by Boston-based New Balance.

Hubway became operational on July 28, 2011, with an event in which members could ride bicycles from City Hall Plaza to a designated bicycle station. The event featured Mayor Menino, representatives from various sponsors, and related agencies. In November 2011, Hubway was shut down and disassembled for the winter as a preventive measure to counter New England winter weather.

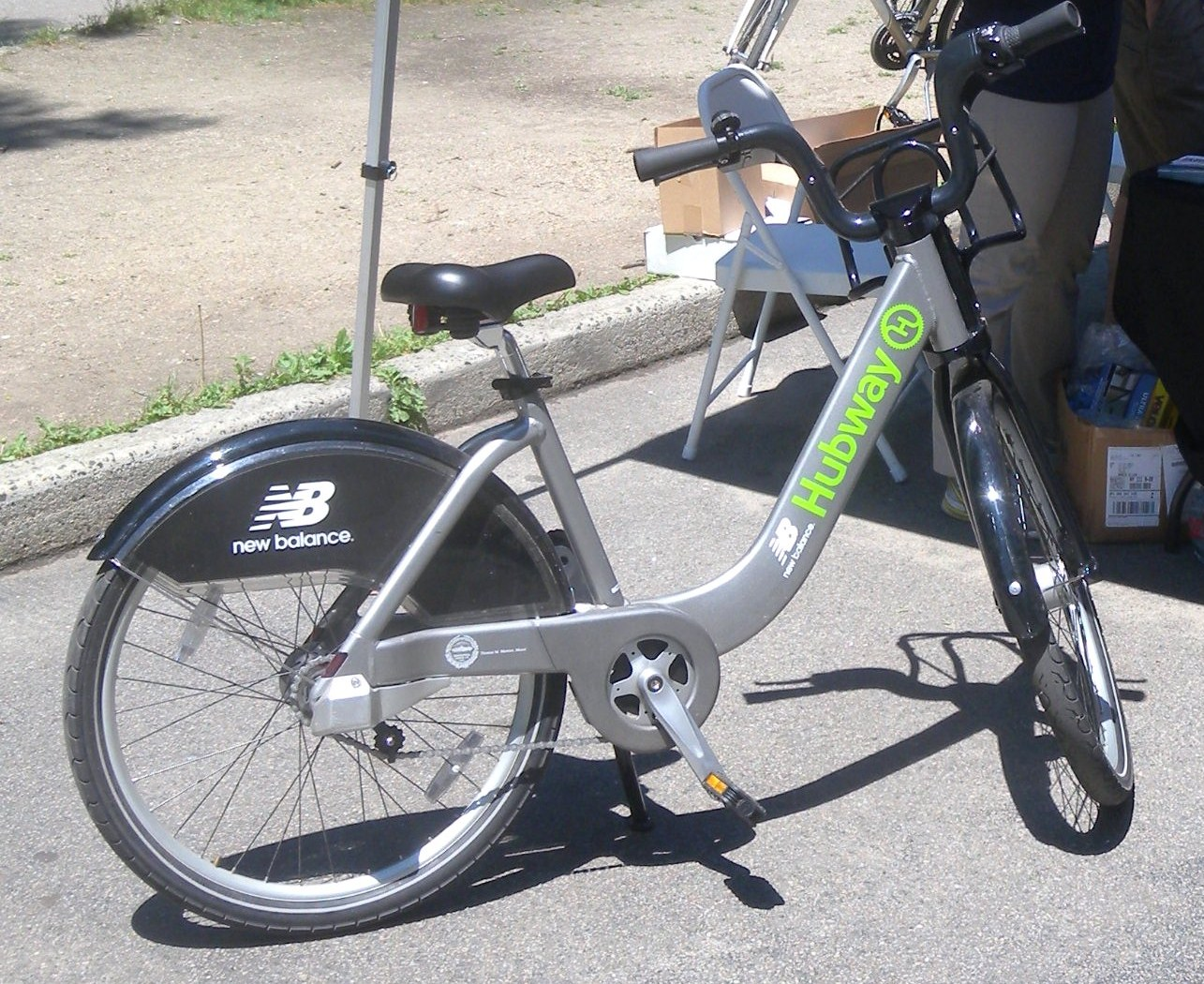
PBSC Hubway bicycle, 2012

On March 15, 2012, Hubway was relaunched for the season with the abutting communities of Brookline, Cambridge, and Somerville also joining. By the end of the 2012 season on November 28, the system had 105 stations and 1,050 bikes. While a majority of the stations continued to be shut down for the winter season over the first years of the program, 25 stations in Cambridge remained open during a successful winter pilot program which became permanent. After the full system relaunched on April 2, 2014, it grew to 140 stations and over 1,300 bikes.

On December 4, 2014, Hubway's non-management employees voted 23–8, 74%, in favor of joining Transport Workers Union of America (TWU) Local 100. The unionization effort came after employees of CitiBike in NYC, owned by the same parent company Motivate (formerly named Alta Bicycle Share), joined TWU Local 100 in September 2014 and was closely followed by similar efforts by employees of Alta Bicycle Share in Washington, D.C., and Chicago.

Full system operations for 2014 concluded on November 26, though the system expanded its winter operations. For the second year, almost all Cambridge-based stations remained open year-round, and those stations were joined by 62 Boston-based stations that remained open through December 31, 2014. Inclement weather pushed back the full system reopening until April 17, 2015, and during the 2015 season the system grew to 155 stations and over 1,500 bicycles. In 2015, regular season operations concluded on November 25, though again Hubway expanded its winter operations further, with 110 stations remaining open through December 7, 2015; of those, 107 stayed open through December 31; and of those, the 37 Cambridge-based stations once again remain open year-round. In May 2017, Boston Mayor Marty Walsh announced a planned two-year expansion, adding 70 new stations and offering year-round service.

As of 2017, Boston was ranked as the city with the fifth largest bike sharing system in the United States, after New York City, Chicago, Washington, D.C., and Minneapolis. The rankings are determined by the number of hubs or stations. At that time, Boston had 184 stations.

=== Re-branding to Bluebikes ===
On March 7, 2018, Hubway announced a six-year partnership with Blue Cross Blue Shield of Massachusetts, which included a system-wide rebranding as Bluebikes, an expansion of 3,000 total bikes, and an addition of over 100 new stations by the end of 2019. Prior to this partnership, the Boston portion of the system had been sponsored by Boston-based athletic company New Balance. The new sponsorship with Blue Cross covers all four municipalities. The name change took effect on May 9, 2018, with the release of new and re-branded bicycles.

On June 4, 2019, Bluebikes set a single-day ridership record with users taking 10,035 trips, the first time the ride-share has ever exceeded the 10,000-rider mark for a single day. On September 19, 2019, Bluebikes passed 10 million total rides. Two years later on September 11, 2021, Bluebikes hit its highest single day record with over 18,000 rides.

In 2020, Bluebikes expanded to Newton, Revere, Chelsea, Arlington, and Watertown, adding over 30 new stations to the system. The following year in June, Bluebikes was launched in Salem with seven stations, bringing the system's span to 10 municipalities. Bluebikes continued to expand in 2021, with projects pursued in Dorchester, Mattapan, and Hyde Park. In 2022, the system expanded to three stations in Medford and three in Malden. By 2023, there were over 4,000 bicycles in the system at over 400 stations, with Salem up to 18 stations.

== Equipment ==
The system uses bicycles designed and manufactured by Montreal-based PBSC. The majority of docking stations are also supplied by PBSC while the newest docking stations are designed and manufactured by 8D Technologies. The platform behind the bike share system is created by 8D Technologies, who also supply the server technology for BIXI Montréal, Citi Bike in New York City, Santander Cycles in London, Capital Bikeshare in Washington, D.C., and others.

Each Bluebike comes with a basket, adjustable seat, and kickstand. For safety during night-time riding, they have self-powered lights at the front and back of the bike. On the left handlebar, Bluebikes are equipped with a bell, and the right handlebar has a continuous gear shifter.

Bluebikes renters may download the app on their Android or iOS device. The app was developed in 2017 and is free to download. The app provides information on the status (e.g., current trip length) of the rental, but it is not required in order to rent a Bluebike. The app allows up to four bikes to be rented out simultaneously on one account. On the app's map, docks appear as green when there are a sufficient number of bikes at the station. Conversely, they appear as red when there are little to none available.

== Rental service ==
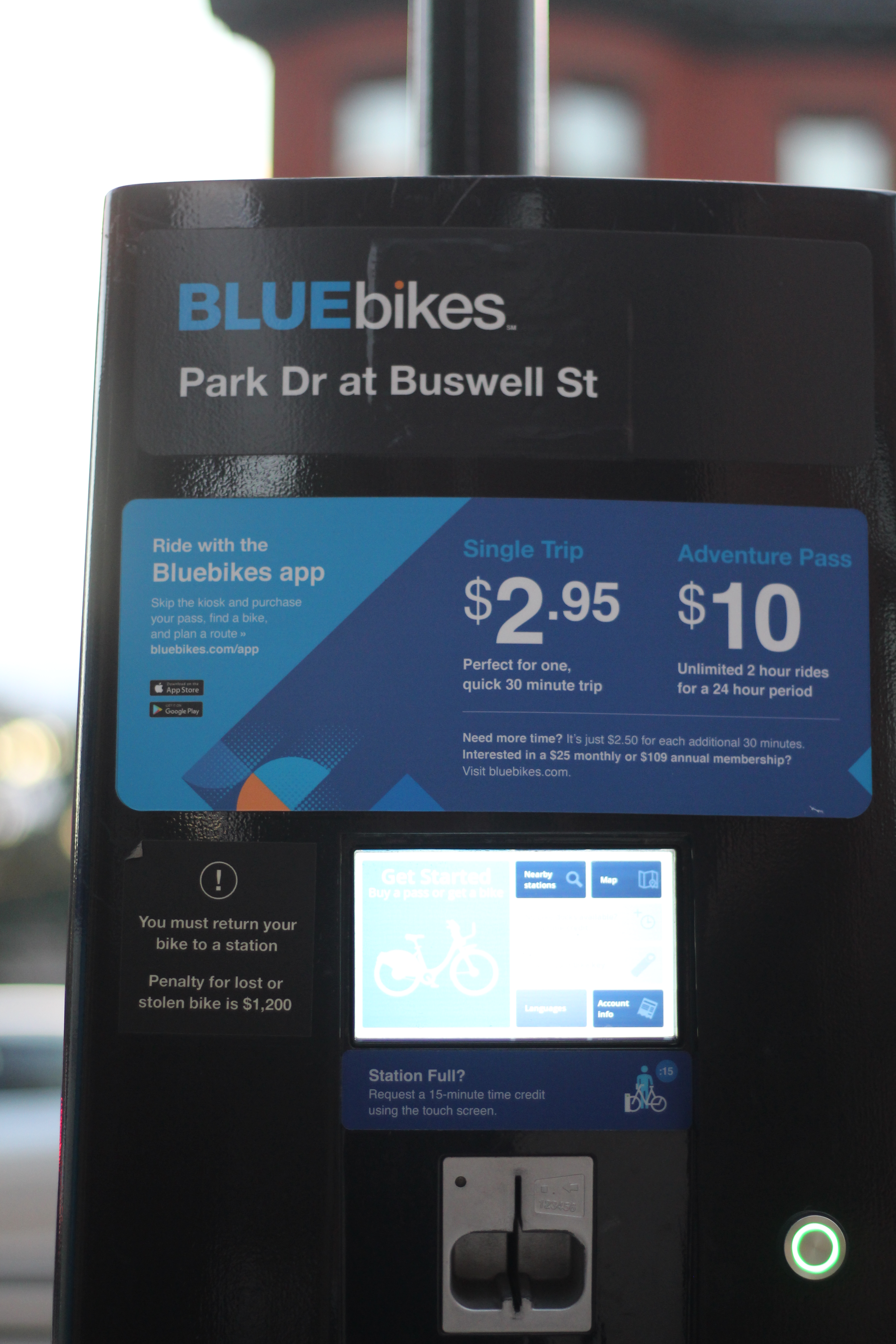
Typical Bluebikes rental kiosk, 2021

To unlock the bike(s), a person must first purchase a pass using a credit or debit card at the solar-powered station kiosk or on the Bluebikes app. A five digit numeric code will be given. For users with monthly or yearly plans, a physical bike key can be requested. When a Bluebikes user inserts their key or enters the code into a keypad next to the bike, the bike detaches itself from the dock. As a renter finishes their trip, they push the bike into the dock and hold it until the light next to the dock turns green to confirm a successful lock. In the case that a Bluebike is not returned to a dock within 24 hours, the renter may be charged a lost bike fee of $1,200.

=== Types of passes ===
A trip begins when a renter removes a bike from a dock, and it ends when the renter returns the bike to the dock. With Monthly and Annual Memberships, bikers are allowed to take an unlimited number of trips per day, with each one lasting less than 45 minutes.

Bluebikes Passes
Type	Pass duration	Max Trip duration†	Rate over Max Duration & E-bike rate†	Cost of Membership
Single trip	30 minutes	30 minutes	$0.25/min	$2.95/unlock
Adventure pass/Day pass	24 hours	2 hours	$0.25/min	$10/pass
Monthly membership	1 month	45 minutes	$0.10/min	$25/month
Annual membership	1 year	45 minutes	$0.10/min	$109/year
Income-Eligible membership	1 year	60 minutes	$0.07/min	$5/year

†The Bluebikes app tracks the time and length of each trip taken. If a renter exceeds the time limit of their pass, Bluebikes bills the renter an additional fee for each additional minute.

== Incentive to ride ==
=== Income-Eligible Program ===
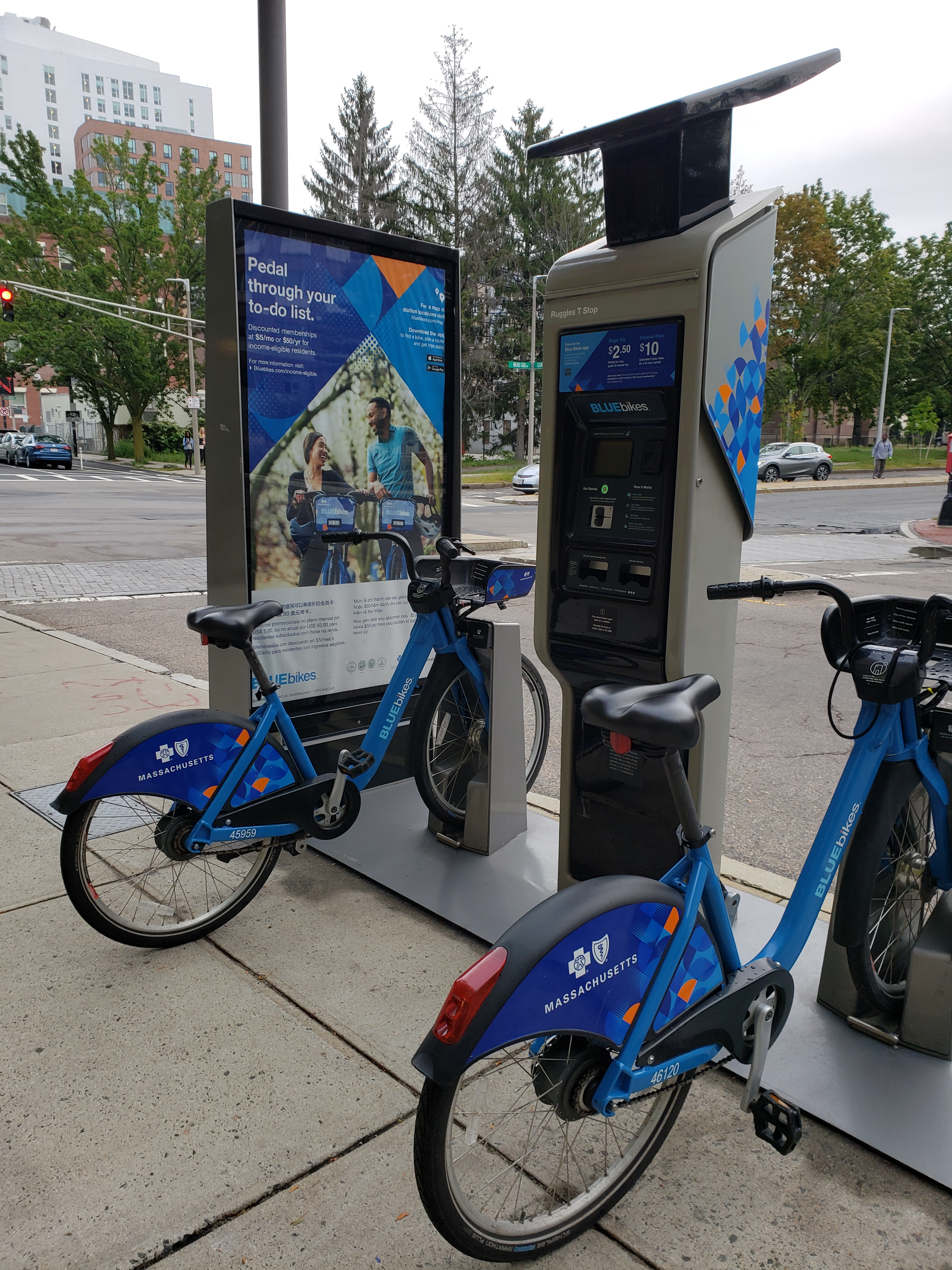
Rental kiosk

In the spring of 2018, as Motivate worked towards expanding the bike share program, attention was also focused on increasing membership opportunities for folks who may not have been able to pay the full price. Bluebikes offered an expanded Income-Eligible Program that offers membership rates of $5 per month or $50 per year, which are discounted from the standard prices of $25 per month or $109 per year (as of 2021). Residents can qualify for these discounted rates via their participation in any one of eleven different assistance programs, including EBT cards, Pell Grants, MassHealth, and Public housing initiatives. Additionally, the Bluebikes program offers a subsidized yearly membership fee of $5 for guests or clients of transitional housing options and homeless shelters located within the city of Boston. Those who qualify for these discounted rates have access to unlimited 60 minute trips — an increase from the standard 45 minute rides — providing additional incentives in order to increase membership among a subset of the population that previously could not access their services.

Mayor Marty Walsh has said that these changes to the Bluebikes initiative are in line with the goals of Boston's Go Boston 2030 transportation plan, which focuses on promoting transportation equity. Jay Walder, who was the CEO and President of Motivate in the spring of 2018, stated that the Income-Eligible Program would make Bluebikes accessible for Bostonians regardless of income, and that these efforts to provide access should serve as a model for sustainable transport initiatives across the country.

Starting on October 5, 2019, Blue Cross Blue Shield of Massachusetts began to sponsor $1 single rides on weekends until the end of 2019 to help combat transportation challenges arising from MBTA shutdowns. Blue Cross has also donated $10,000 to the Bluebikes Income-Eligibility Program to increase affordability.

=== Other discounts ===
Bluebikes provided free trips with one-time use codes to travel to polling places in 2020 and COVID-19 vaccination sites in 2021. On each Monday of August 2021, Bluebikes offered complimentary Adventure Passes as a part of their celebration for National Wellness Month. The campaign, titled "Mindful Mondays", was sponsored by Blue Cross Blue Shield.

Various companies and colleges, including Massachusetts Institute of Technology, Boston University, Emerson College, Harvard University, and Tufts University, have enrolled in the Bluebikes Corporate Partner Program. This allows individuals of those organizations to enroll in a Bluebikes membership at a discounted rate, subsidized by their respective company.

=== Bike Angels rewards program ===
Similar to the bike sharing systems of New York City and Washington, D.C., Bluebikes also offers a rewards system to incentivize renters to move bikes to certain docks. This is set up to alleviate the company's amount of transportation work. A renter receives points when they bring a bike to a sparsely populated dock or take a bike out of a full dock. The points are updated every fifteen minutes and vary depending on the severity of excess supply or demand. Rewards include free adventure passes for friends, membership extensions, and gift cards.

== See also ==
- Cycling in Boston
- List of bicycle-sharing systems
- Citi Bike
