= Pronto Cycle Share =

Bike sharing system in Seattle, Washington, United States

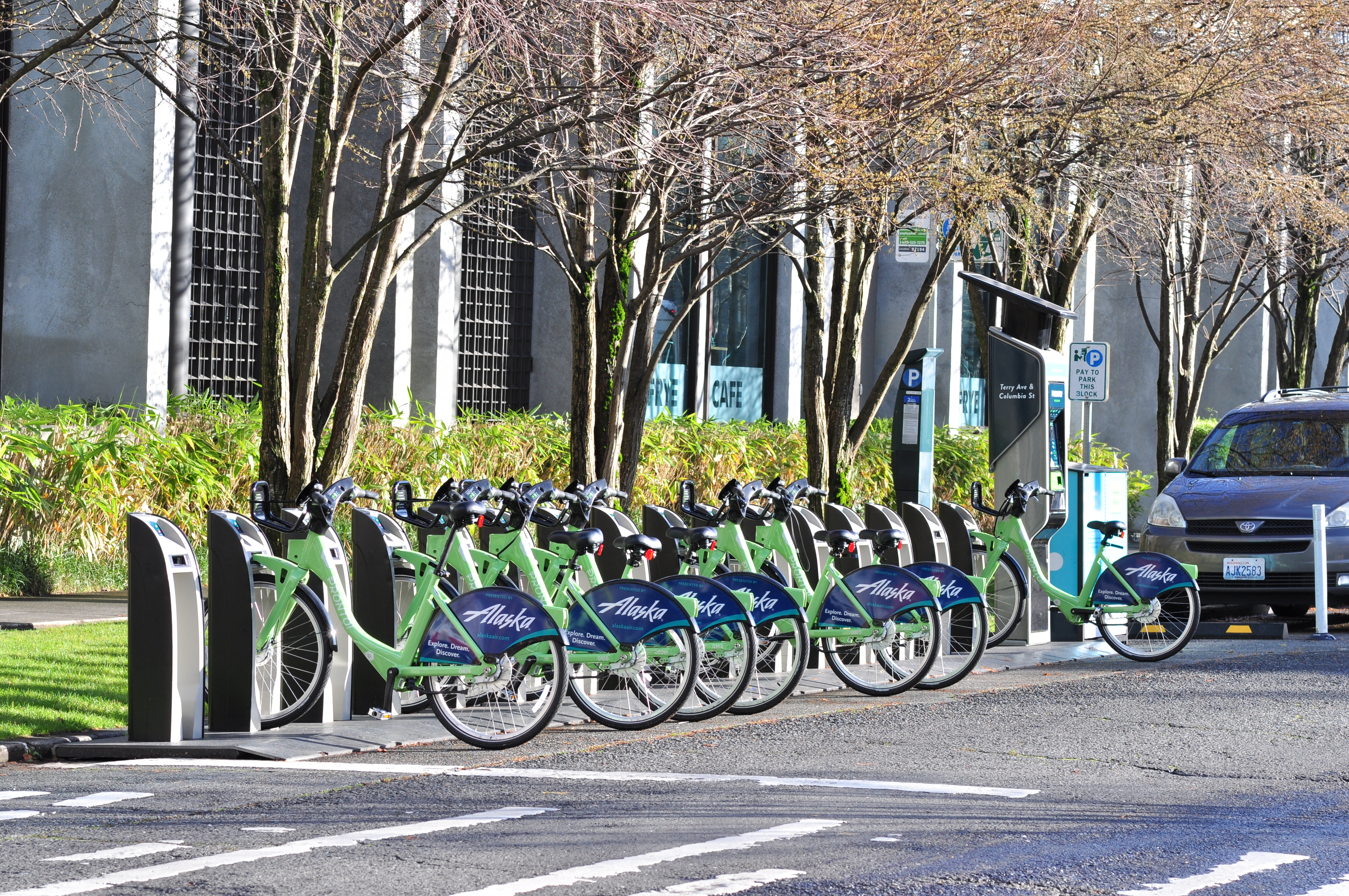

Overview
- Owner: Puget Sound Bike Share
- Locale: Seattle, Washington
- Transit type: Bicycle-sharing system
- Number of stations: 50
- Chief executive: Holly Houser, Executive Director
- Website: prontocycleshare.com

Operation
- Began operation: October 13, 2014; 12 years ago
- Ended operation: March 31, 2017; 9 years ago
- Operator: Motivate
- Number of vehicles: 500
System map
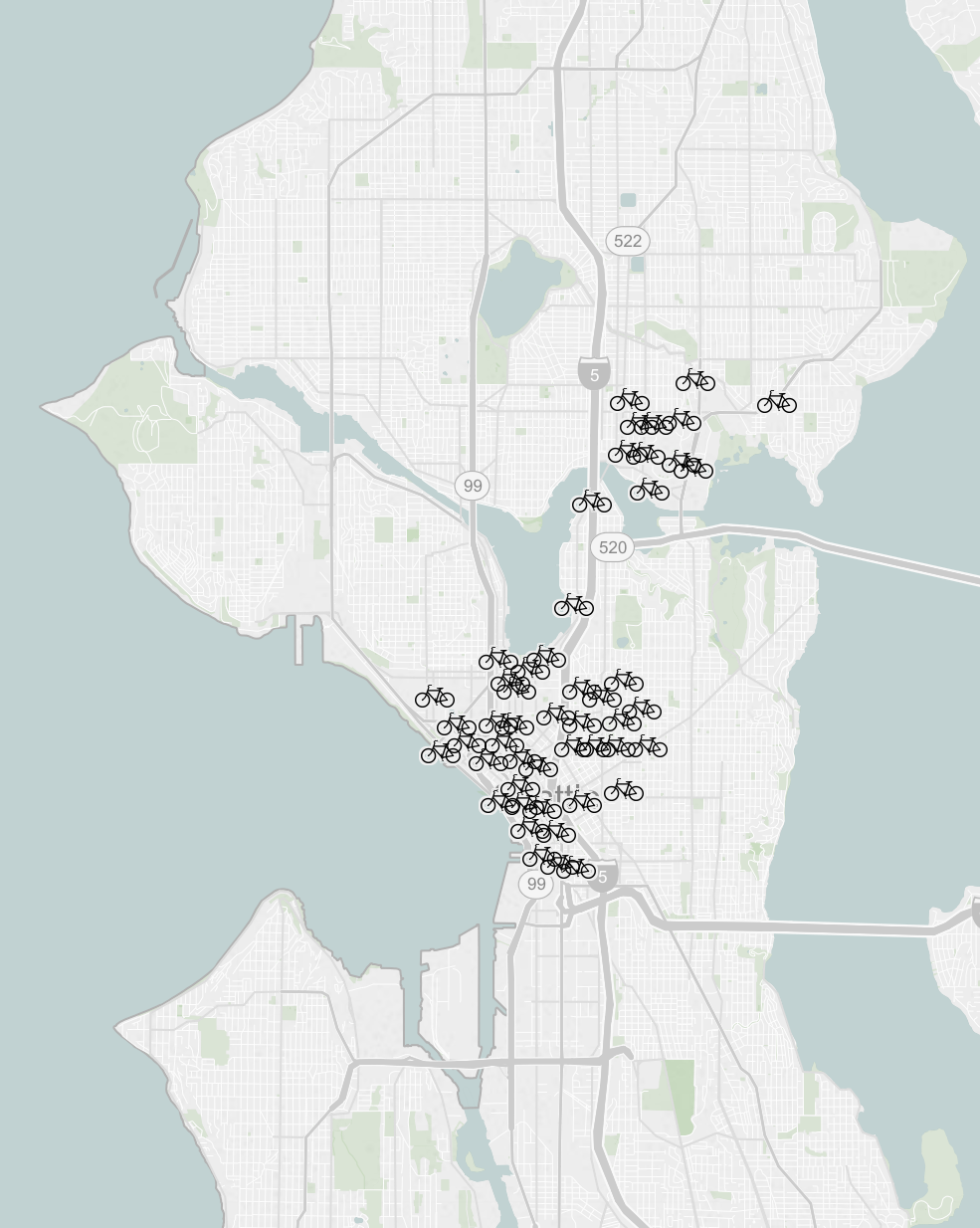

Pronto Cycle Share, branded as Pronto!, was a public bicycle-sharing system in Seattle, Washington, that operated from 2014 to 2017. The system, initially owned by a non-profit and later by the Seattle Department of Transportation, included 54 stations in the city's central neighborhoods with 500 bicycles. Motivate (formerly Alta Bike Share) operated the system, and Alaska Airlines helped sponsor it. On March 31, 2017, Pronto shut down operations, and disassembly of stations began, with the bicycles being offered to other cities that wish to start a similar system.

== History ==
Pronto launched on October 13, 2014, with 500 bikes in 50 stations available for use in Downtown, South Lake Union, Belltown, Capitol Hill, the U-District, Eastlake, First Hill, Pioneer Square, and the International District. It soon ran into major funding issues in 2015 after the City of Seattle put any further fundraising on hold while awaiting council approval to purchase the system.

The City of Seattle finally bought the system for $1.4 million on March 14, 2016, but by this time, the system had become insolvent due to less than expected ridership, revenue, and a lack of funding. It was originally planned to be replaced with a new bikeshare system using a vendor who used electric bicycles, but the new system was cancelled in January 2017. The city decided to direct Pronto's share of $3 million in funding towards Safe Routes to School as well as other bicycle and pedestrian programs.

On March 31, 2017, Pronto shut down operations, and disassembly of stations began, with the bicycles being offered to other cities that wish to start a similar system.

Later in 2017, Seattle allowed private companies to operate a replacement bikeshare network and became the first large city in North America to host a dockless system.

== Membership and fees ==
Use of the Pronto system was based on either annual memberships ($85) or short-term passes of either 24 hours ($8) or 3 days ($16).

== Helmet law compliance ==
Pronto Cycle Share was the first public bicycle sharing system in the United States to operate where a bicycle helmet law applies to cyclists of all ages. To address this, the system installed helmet dispensers at each kiosk, along with a collection bin for used helmets. At the system's launch in October 2014, the helmets were available for free on the Honor system. A rental system was put into effect starting in spring 2015.

== Sponsorship ==
Seattle-based Alaska Airlines paid $2.5 million for a 5-year primary sponsorship that included their logo on the bikes themselves. Seattle Children's Hospital, Group Health, REI, Vulcan Real Estate, and Fred Hutchinson Cancer Center were among the secondary sponsors.

== Technology ==
The Pronto bike share system technology, both hardware and software, was provided by 8D Technologies, which also supplies the server technology for BIXI Montréal, Citi Bike in New York City, Santander Cycles in London, Capital Bikeshare in Washington DC, and others.

== See also ==
- List of bicycle-sharing systems
