= Motivate (company) =

American bikeshare operator

Motivate LLC
- Formerly: Alta BicycleShare
- Type: Subsidiary
- Headquarters: New York, New York, U.S.
- Area served: United States
- Key people: Matthew Parker (CEO)
- Services: Bicycle-sharing system and urban service provider
- Revenue: 100 million
- Number of employees: 1500+ (2021)
- Parent: Lyft
- Website: motivateco.com

Motivate LLC (formerly Alta Bicycle Share and also Motivate International Inc.) is a company based in New York City that services bicycle sharing systems and other urban services in North America.

The systems provide a flexible method for completing short trips, as contrasted with the longer rentals offered by traditional bike rental companies. Since 2018, Motivate has been a subsidiary of Lyft.

== History ==
Alta Bicycle Share was formed in 2010.

Alta was listed in Fast Company's "World's Most Innovative Companies" for 2014 in February 2014.

In October 2014, it was announced that the company had been acquired by Bikeshare Holdings LLC and would be relocating headquarters from Portland, Oregon to New York City under the leadership of Jay Walder.

Following the acquisition, Alta rebranded to Motivate on January 14, 2015.

Subsequently, Motivate announced its acquisition of 8D Technologies, the technology provider for a number of the systems it already operated, in February 2017. In July 2018, Lyft announced that it would acquire Motivate and continue to operate it as a standalone business.

== Currently operating systems ==
Motivate currently operates eight systems in public-private partnerships with local governments:

- Bay Wheels, in the San Francisco Bay Area, California, with bike stations in downtown San Francisco, San Jose, and East Bay, California.
- Biketown PDX in Portland, Oregon began operating in July 2016.
- Capital Bikeshare in Washington, D.C., with service to Washington, DC.; Arlington, VA; Alexandria, VA; Montgomery County, MD; Prince George's County, MD; Fairfax County, VA; City of Fairfax, VA; and the City of Falls Church, VA
- Citi Bike in New York City and adjacent cities in New Jersey
- CoGo in Columbus, OH from Ohio State University to Schiller Park in German Village (and a separate system at Easton Town Center)
- Divvy in Chicago (as of February 1st 2024 Shift Transit took over operations of Divvy in Chicago)
- Bluebikes in the metro-Boston area (Boston, Brookline, Cambridge, and Somerville).

== Discontinued systems ==
- Bike Share Toronto in Toronto,
- Melbourne Bike Share in Melbourne, Australia, sold the system to RACV.
- Pronto Cycle Share in Seattle, Washington
- Bike Chattanooga in Chattanooga, TN
- Nice Ride Minnesota in Minneapolis and St Paul

== Systems suppliers ==
Motivate-operated systems have used multiple suppliers for bikes, stations, kiosks, and technology across each city including 8D Technologies and Montreal-based PBSC Urban Solutions for equipment and technology and Cycles Devinci and Arcade Cycles for bicycles.

== See also ==
- List of bicycle sharing systems
- Utility cycling – Short-term hire schemes
