= Lyft Bike =

Public bikeshare system in San Francisco

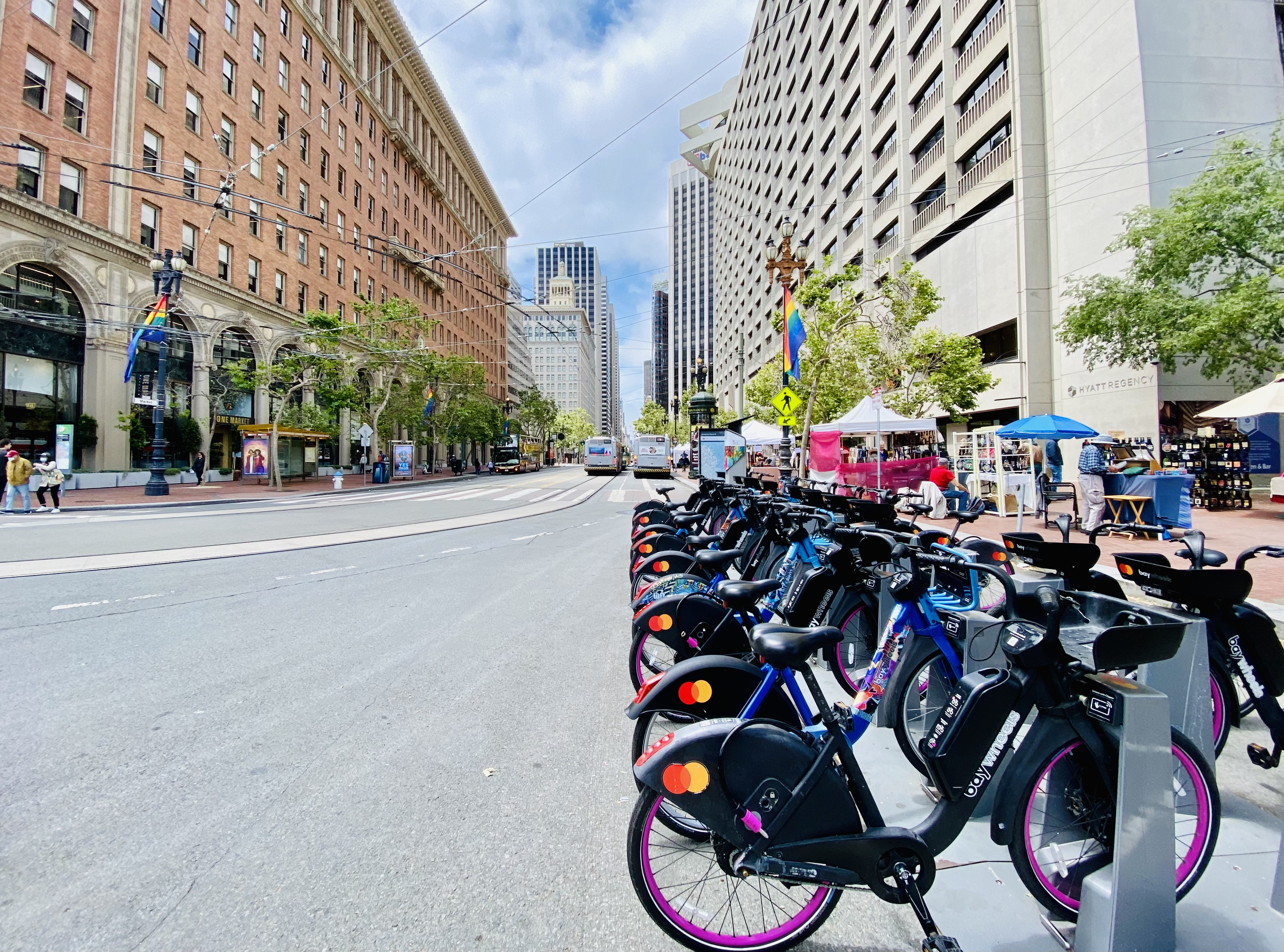
- Bay Wheels bikes near The Embarcadero.

Overview
- Owner: Lyft
- Locale: San Francisco Bay Area, California, U.S.
- Transit type: Bicycle sharing system
- Number of stations: 262+
- Website: www.lyft.com/bikes/bay-wheels

Operation
- Began operation: August 29, 2013 (Bay Area Bike Share) June 28, 2017 (Ford GoBike) June 11, 2019 (Bay Wheels)
- Operator: Motivate
- Number of vehicles: 2,600+

Lyft Bike, formerly Bay Wheels, is a regional public bicycle sharing system in California's San Francisco Bay Area. It is operated by Motivate in a partnership with the Metropolitan Transportation Commission and the Bay Area Air Quality Management District. Lyft Bike is the first regional and large-scale bicycle sharing system deployed in California and on the West Coast of the United States. It was established as Bay Area Bike Share in August 2013. As of January 2018, the system had over 2,600 bicycles in 262 stations across San Francisco, East Bay and San Jose.

On June 28, 2017, the system was officially re-launched as Ford GoBike in a partnership with Ford Motor Company. After Motivate's acquisition by Lyft, the system was renamed to Bay Wheels on June 11, 2019 and then to its current name on July 29, 2026. The system is expected to expand to 7,000 bicycles around 540 stations in San Francisco, Oakland, Berkeley, Emeryville, and San Jose.

== History ==
The system's original logo and branding, 2013

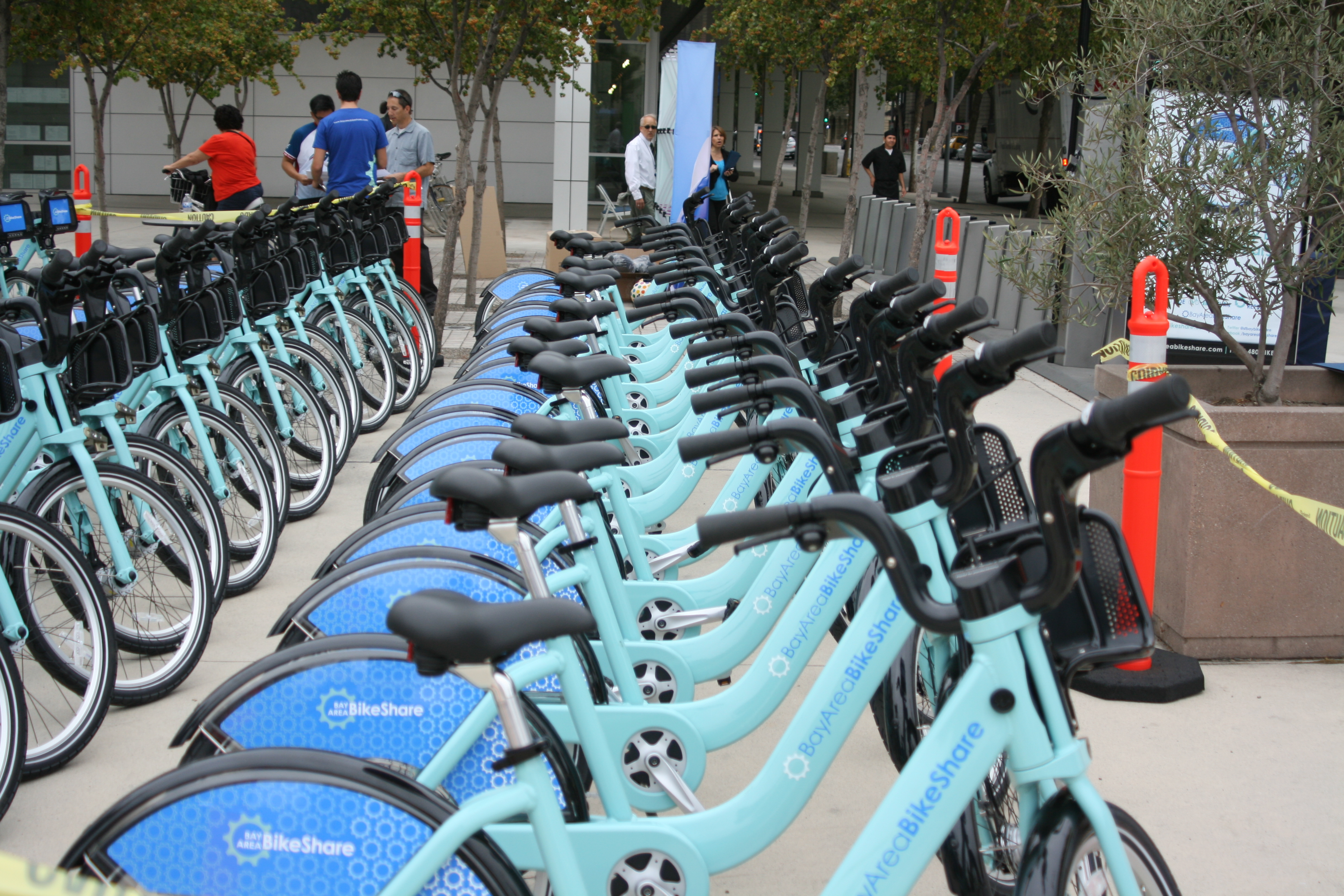
Service launch in San Jose, California, on August 29, 2013.

The system was originally launched as Bay Area Bike Share in August 2013. At launch, it became the first regional bicycle sharing system deployed on the West Coast of the United States and also the first regional system in the U.S. that services more than just a single city or adjacent cities. The original system was described as a pilot program and consisted of only 700 bicycles with 70 stations, 34 of which were in San Francisco. The program's original administrator was the Bay Area Air Quality Management District, which handed off the public management of the system to the Metropolitan Transportation Commission in 2016. The launch system was funded with $11.2 million of public funds from a variety of sources, including from the MTC and Air District.

Bay Area Bike Share had originally planned for a larger initial rollout with 1000 bicycles and 50 stations in San Francisco. Plans to expand the original system in 2013 had stalled until 2015 due to problems with the system's suppliers. In particular, PBSC Urban Solutions, which supplied both hardware and software for the system, had filed for bankruptcy. The system's operating company, then called Alta Bicycle Share, had also gone up for sale. The expansion efforts relaunched in 2015 when Alta Bicycle Share had reorganized itself as Motivate after an acquisition. Subsequently, Motivate made a proposal to the MTC to expand the pilot system using private funding. On May 27, 2015, the MTC entered into a contract granting Motivate the exclusive right to operate bike sharing in the target cities and to manage the expansion.

In September 2016, Ford announced that it would sponsor the system with a contribution of $50 million, finally enabling the planned expansion from the original system's 700 bicycles to 7000. On June 28, 2017, the system officially re-launched as Ford GoBike.

Coinciding with the expansion and rebranding as Ford GoBike, Motivate launched several new programs such as integration with Clipper cards and a low-income pricing option. In April 2018, Ford GoBike added 250 electric bicycles by GenZe as part of their fleet. The system also launched dockless bike share for its San Jose service area in June 2018.

As of January 2018, the Bay Wheels system had about 10,000 annual subscribers, over 2,600 bicycles in 262 stations across San Francisco, East Bay and San Jose.

In June 2019, after Motivate's acquisition by Lyft, the system rebranded to Bay Wheels and dropped the Ford naming. Along with the rebranding, Bay Wheels also deployed a new generation of bicycles which can use bikeshare docks and also operate in a dockless mode, in which customers can lock the bike to a bicycle rack with a built-in lock. In July 2019, defects with the batteries for the electric bicycle models caused Lyft to withdraw all electric-assist models until December 2019, when electric-assist service relaunched with updated hardware.

== Operation ==
The system is operated by Motivate in a partnership with the MTC as program administrator. Motivate also operates several other programs in the United States. The initial pilot system was supported with about US$11 million in initial public funding from several regional transportation, environmental and municipal agencies. The current system, relaunched in 2017, is operated with private funding.

Motivate's contract specifies an exclusivity agreement with the MTC, specifying it as the sole operator of bike sharing in the program's cities. Several other companies have expressed interest in operating competing bike sharing systems in San Francisco, which led to a legal settlement allowing a one-time exception for Jump Bikes to operate an e-bike sharing program in San Francisco. Since the settlement, the city of San Francisco has sought to expand the operation of dockless bicycles to additional operators. In response, Lyft has filed a lawsuit against the city in an attempt to block other competing bicycle sharing operators, citing the exclusivity agreement with MTC. The city disagrees with Lyft on the terms of its exclusivity agreement, arguing that it only grants exclusive rights to operate a docked bicycle sharing system.

== Technology ==
The Bay Wheels fleet consists of two kinds of bicycles: a "Classic" docked model with a step-through frame and a "hybrid" electric-assist model that can be parked at a dock or used in a dockless manner with a rear-wheel lock. In previous iterations of the service, other models were included in the fleet such as a dockless bicycle without electric-assist capabilities, and a docked electric-assist model manufactured by GenZe. All models are aluminum frame utility bicycles equipped with integrated lighting, front luggage rack, and continuously variable gear shifting.

The stations and standard bikes are provided by 8D Technologies and Motivate.

All bicycle docks and dockless bicycles in the system are equipped with a contactless smart card reader that works with the Clipper card used by the Bay Area's transit agencies. This allows members to tap their Clipper card in order to rent a bicycle instead of scanning the bike's QR code with the Bay Wheels or Lyft app. The Clipper card is only used for identification and cannot be used to pay for bicycle rental from its stored cash.

== Pricing ==
The bicycles are available 24 hours a day, 365 days a year. Customers may choose from a number of options ranging from a single ride to an annual membership. Single rides start at $3 per trip, day passes cost $10 per day, and memberships cost $25 per month or $159 per year. Fees are charged for time overages and for e-bike rides; see the table below.

A reduced pricing option called "Bike Share for All" exists for users who qualify for CalFresh, the SFMTA's Lifeline pass, or PG&E's CARE discount. The reduced price is $5/year for the first year and $5/month in subsequent years. As of January 2018, around 15% of the membership of the bikeshare system used the Bike Share for All option.

There is no per-minute charge for renting a standard bicycle, up to an included amount of time (30 minutes for single rides or day passes, 45 minutes for full-price members, and 60 minutes for Bike Share for All members). Each additional 15 minutes incurs an extra fee of $3 (for single rides or day passes) or $2 (for members).

E-bikes incur an additional per-minute charge up to the included ride time ($0.30 per minute for single rides or day passes, $0.20 per minute for full-price members, and $0.05 per minute up to a maximum of $1 for Bike Share for All members). These per-minute charges are capped at $2 for members if starting or ending in certain neighborhoods that are "less connected to transit". A $2 locking fee is charged if ending an e-bike ride by using the built-in lock rather than docking at a station, unless the nearest station is full or the ride is ended in certain neighborhoods that lack docking stations. Finally, a $25 fee is charged if ending an e-bike ride outside of the Bay Wheels service area. The full scheme is laid out in the table below.

None of the prices listed in this section include sales tax.

Bay Wheels per-ride pricing as of September 23, 2021
	No membership	Full-price monthly or annual membership	Bike Share for All membership
Unlock fee	$3	None	None
Included ride time (per trip)	30 minutes	45 minutes	60 minutes
Price per minute after included ride time	$0.30	$0.20	$0.13
Price per minute during included ride time (e-bikes only)◆	$0.30	$0.20	$0.05 (capped at $1)
Parking outside of a docking station (e-bikes only)‡	$2	$2	$2
Parking outside of the Bay Wheels service area (e-bikes only)	$25	$25	$25
◆ Not applicable in San José. Waived if e-bikes are the only option at a station. Capped at $2 for members if starting or ending in any of the following neighborhoods in San Francisco: the Richmond District (west of 19th Avenue), Bayview-Hunters Point, Candlestick Point, the Portola, the Excelsior District, Crocker-Amazon, Visitacion Valley, Little Hollywood, Balboa Park, and Sunnyside (see the complete map here). ‡ Waived if the nearest docking station is full or if ending in any of the following neighborhoods in San Francisco: the Sunset District, Parkmerced, West Portal, St. Francis Wood, Forest Hill, Miraloma, Twin Peaks, Midtown Terrace, Golden Gate Heights, Ingleside, Oceanview, Merced Heights, the Outer Mission, the Excelsior District, Sunnydale, Visitacion Valley, Little Hollywood, Bernal Heights (south of Cortland Avenue), Hunters Point, Candlestick Point, and the Presidio (see the complete map here).

== Bike Angels program ==
In order to keep bikes and docks balanced throughout the service area, Bay Wheels offers an incentive program called Bike Angels. At any given time, each docking station is assigned a point value for picking up or dropping off bikes, based on availability, which is displayed in the Bay Wheels app. Members who take out a bike from a neutral station or station with pick-up points and deposit it at a neutral station or station with drop-off points will earn the sum of pick-up points from the beginning station and drop-off points from the ending station. No points are awarded if the beginning station has drop-off points or the ending station has pick-up points. Members can accumulate points each month and over their lifetime to earn rewards such as e-bike ride credit, membership extensions, water bottles, and keychains.

== See also ==
- List of bicycle sharing systems
