= Nice Ride Minnesota =

Bike sharing system in the Minneapolis and St. Paul Minnesota area

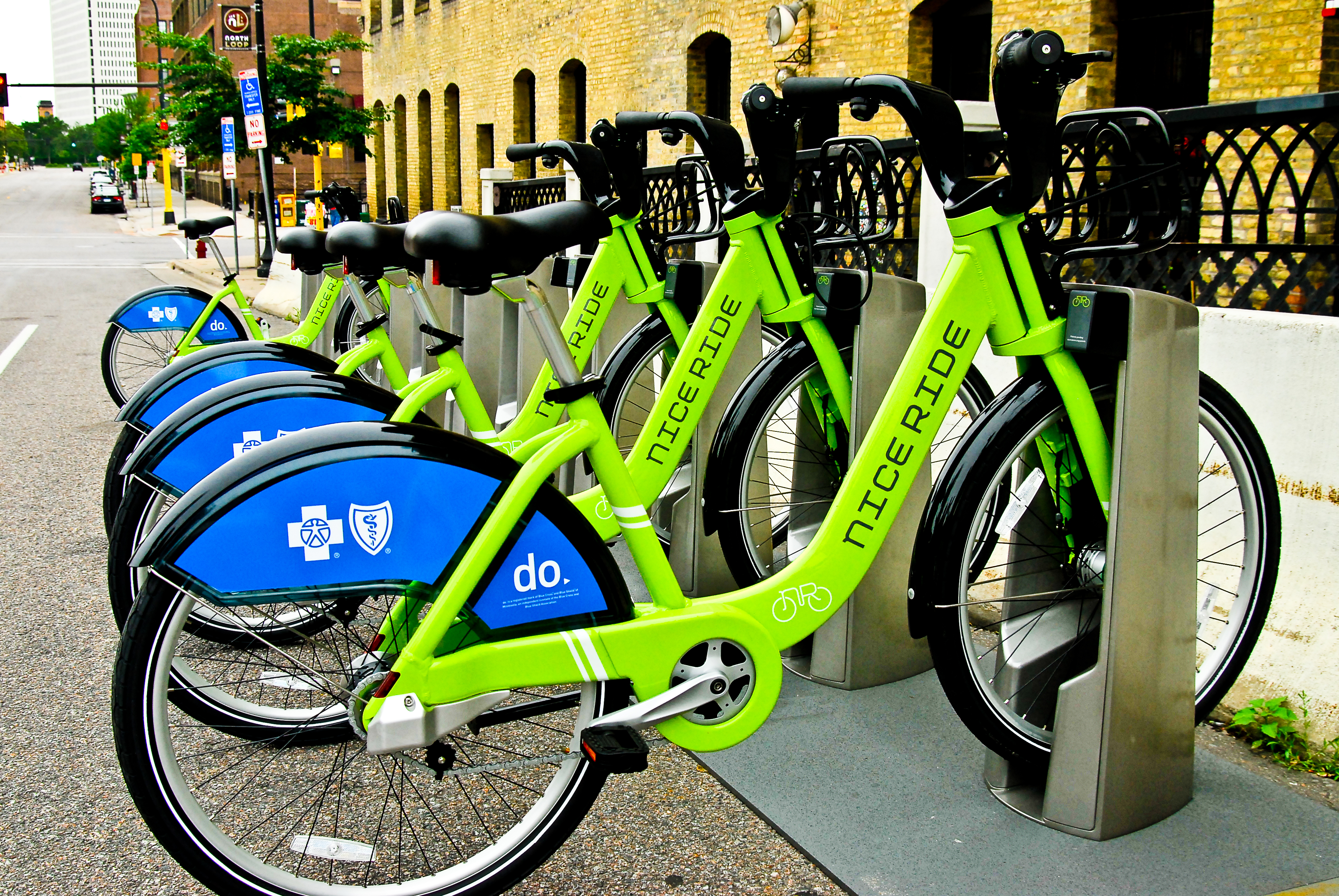
- Bikes at a Nice Ride MN station

Overview
- Owner: City of Minneapolis
- Locale: Minneapolis – Saint Paul, Minnesota
- Transit type: Bicycle-sharing system
- Number of stations: 190
- Website: niceridemn.com

Operation
- Began operation: June 10, 2010; 16 years ago
- Ended operation: November 13, 2022; 4 years ago
- Operator: Lyft
- Number of vehicles: 1,700

Nice Ride Minnesota was a seasonally operated nonprofit bicycle sharing system in Minneapolis and St. Paul, Minnesota based on the BIXI brand created by Public Bike System Company and first used in Montreal. Launched on June 10, 2010, it served over 10,000 trips in its first month and reached 100,817 rides in the first season of operation. The bicycles in the system are manufactured by Cycles Devinci. They are painted fluorescent green and include a cargo carrier and headlights. They receive daily maintenance, and are redistributed throughout the system via truck.

As of 2011, the system offered 1,700 bicycles for rent at 190 kiosks in both Minneapolis and St. Paul. The solar-powered kiosks are distributed throughout much of Minneapolis and Saint Paul. Bike availability can be checked in real-time via smartphone or an online map. In the long term, the network is intended to cover most of Minneapolis and St. Paul. Nice Ride operates from the first week of April through the first week of November. The bikes and stations are removed during the winter in order to protect them from damage (particularly corrosion from road salt) and make way for snow plows.

The system did not reopen after the end of the 2022 season, as Blue Cross Blue Shield, the main sponsor, announced it would not renew its sponsorship contract.

== Memberships and fees ==
There were two ways to use the Nice Ride system, as a passholder or a member. Passes were available for 24 hours or 30 days and memberships included 30-day and 1-year options. Memberships had to be purchased or redeemed through the Nice Ride website, while passes could be purchased by credit or debit card at individual station kiosks for $6 (24 hours) or $18 (30 days). Members received an RFID "key" which was inserted into a slot on the bike dock to unlock a bike. Using a key to unlock a bike only took a few seconds, while the process of purchasing a 24-hour or 30-day pass and getting subsequent rentals required more user interaction with the kiosk.

There was no limit to the number of trips allowed during a pass or membership period. For passholders, there was no additional charge for the first 30 minutes of each trip. Alternately, members got a full 60 minutes between stations with no additional charge. However, trip fees racked up quickly—particularly after 90 minutes without redocking the bike—reaching up to a daily limit of $65 after 7 hours of use (in addition to any pass or membership fee). This fee structure was designed to encourage short trips, keep bikes available, and push customers desiring multi-hour trips to use for-profit rental businesses rather than the subsidized bike-share service. Only about 2% of trips incurred any fees.

In the 2010 and 2011 seasons, Nice Ride placed an authorization hold on the credit or debit accounts of 24-hour subscribers per bicycle rented (24-hour subscribers can rent two bikes per credit/debit card at a time). The holds were initially set at $250 when system was launched in 2010, which caused problems for some customers—particularly those who had used debit cards, where it was possible cause an account overdraft. Prior to the system's launch, there was a concern that a large percentage of the bicycles would be stolen—especially in light of the Vélib' system in Paris, France, which had a theft rate of more than 50% in its first 18 months, and previous experience with theft and vandalism of free bikes provided by the Yellow Bike Coalition in Saint Paul a decade earlier. However, those worries proved to be unfounded with the new Bixi-based system—only one bike was counted as stolen in the 2010 season, and no bikes were lost or stolen in 2011. The authorization holds were reduced to $50 a few months after the June 2010 opening and were removed entirely for 2012.

== System rollout and expansion ==
The Nice Ride system was first put in place in areas near downtown Minneapolis and has been expanded in multiple phases. The system expanded into western areas of neighboring Saint Paul in summer 2011 and had its first stations deployed in downtown Saint Paul in June 2012, bringing the total number of bikes to 1,328 and stations to 146. In May 2013, the system were further expended with the installation of 24 additional stations, mostly located in southern Minneapolis or along the Mississippi River, raising the total number of bikes to 1,550 and the total number of stations to 170.

Nice Ride was criticized by residents in North Minneapolis, an economically disadvantaged part of the city, when the initial deployment of bikes in June 2010 was focused around downtown Minneapolis and areas south of downtown (which tend to be more densely populated than the city's north side). It took until the second phase of deployment in 2010 for the neighborhood to get stations. The first stations in North Minneapolis appeared along Broadway and at Summit Academy and International Market Square.

Startup funding for this program was $3.2 million; major contributors included Blue Cross and Blue Shield of Minnesota, the City of Minneapolis, and a federal transportation grant from the Nonmotorized Transportation Pilot Program.

== Ridership ==
Year	Date opened	Date closed	Days in operation	Ridership	Ridership per day	Stations
2010	June 10	November 7	150	100,817	672	65
2011	April 8	November 6	212	217,530	1,026	116
2012	April 2	November 4	216	274,045	1,269	145
2013	Before April 10	November 3	207	305,000	1,473	170
2014	April 11	November 2	205	409,000	1,995	170
2015	April 1	November 1	214	483,223	2,258	190
2016	April 4	November 6	216	432,284	2,001	198
2017	April 3	November 5	216	460,718	2,133	201

== Technology ==
The platform behind the bike share system is created by 8D Technologies, who also supply the server technology for BIXI Montréal, Citi Bike in New York City, Santander Cycles in London, Capital Bikeshare in Washington DC, and others.

== Future Plans ==
On January 16, 2018, Nice Ride Minnesota announced that it had chosen Motivate's proposal for transition of the Twin Cities’ bike share system.

== See also ==
- List of bicycle-sharing systems
- List of shared-use paths in Minneapolis
