= 8D Technologies =

Canadian company

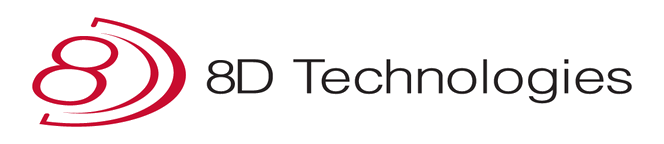
- Type: Privately held
- Founded: 1996
- Founders: Jean-Sébastien Bettez and Isabelle Bettez
- Fate: Merged with Motivate LLC
- Headquarters: Montreal, Quebec, Canada
- Number of locations: 11
- Products: Bicycle-sharing system, Automated parking management systems
- Website: https://www.8d.com/

8D Technologies was a Canadian company that developed bicycle-sharing systems and automated parking management systems. It merged with Motivate in 2017.

== History ==
=== Early years ===
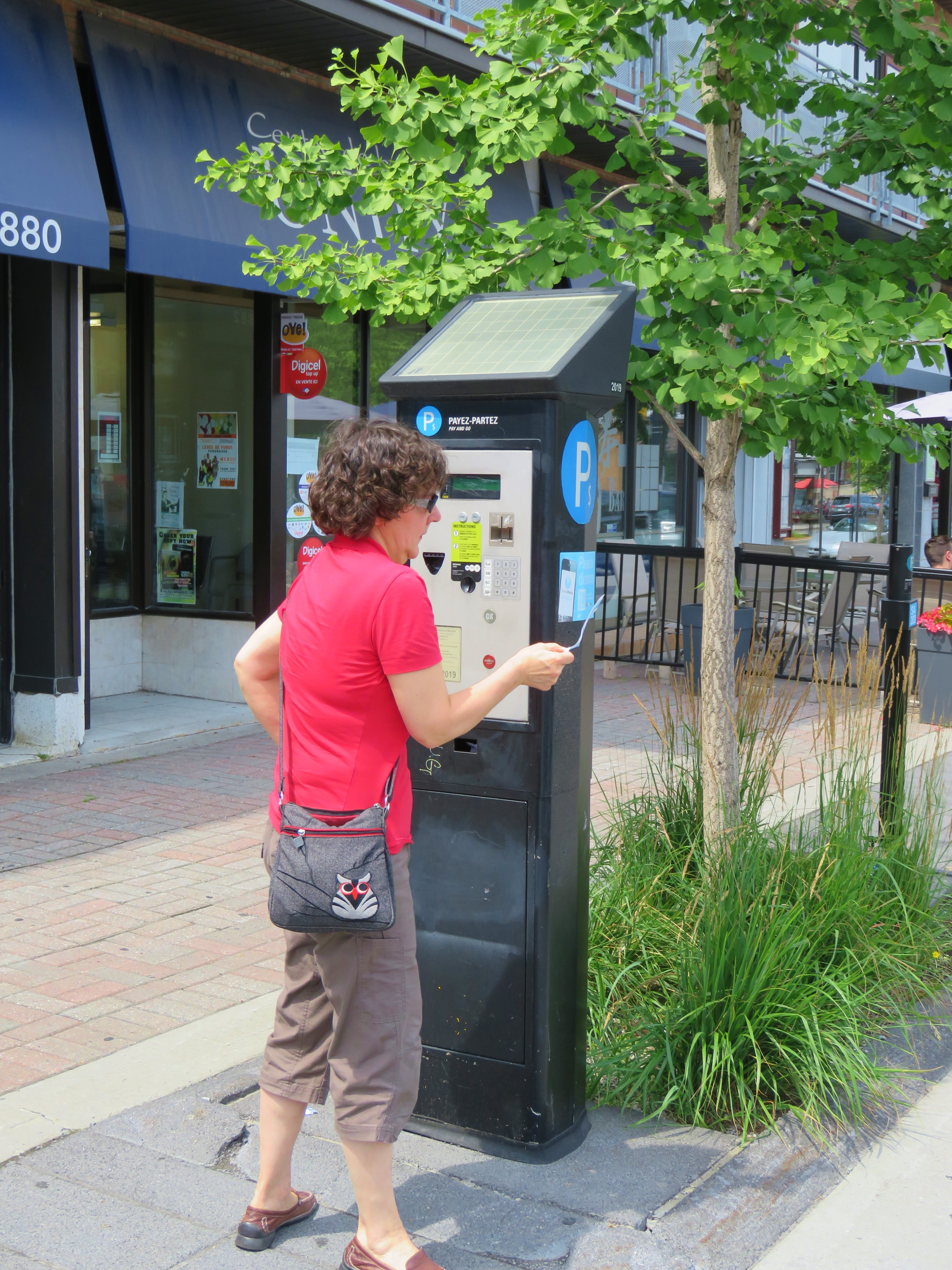
8D wireless parking terminal in Montreal

8D Technologies was founded in Montreal, Quebec, Canada, in 1996, by CTO Jean-Sébastien Bettez. Initially a professional services firm, the company shifted its focus towards the product market in 2000 when Jean-Sébastien's sister, Isabelle Bettez, joined 8D and became its CEO.

=== Stationnement de Montréal ===
In 2002, 8D Technologies, along with partner Cale Systems, was selected by Société en commandite Stationnement de Montréal (SCSM), Montreal's parking authority, to provide an automated parking management system for the city. 8D provided the technological platform (terminal computers, network technology, software platform) while Cale manufactured the terminals. The new pay by space system would replace Montreal's thousands of aging mechanical parking meters. The new system, consisting of solar-powered payment terminals that wirelessly process payments in real-time, was programmed in Java on a Linux platform. After successfully testing the platform in 2003, notably with regards to Montreal's cold winters, SCSM started to deploy terminals on the streets of Montreal in 2004.

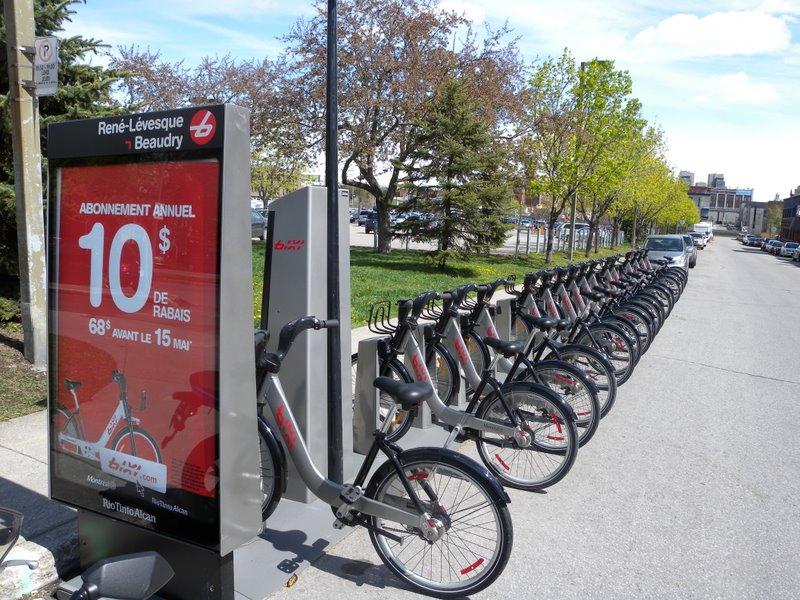
Bixi bike station powered by the 8D Technologies platform

=== BIXI ===
When the city of Montreal decided to implement a bicycle sharing system in 2007, it mandated SCSM to carry out the project. SCSM created the not-for-profit organization Société de vélo en libre-service (SVLS) to operate the BIXI bike share system. Building on the success of the wireless payment solution that equipped SCSM's automated parking system, 8D Technologies provided the technological platform for the BIXI program, including the wireless solar-powered bike station terminals, the RFID bike dock technology and all software systems. Over the next 2 years, BIXI would rapidly expand by selling the 8D-powered bike share system to cities around the world: Melbourne in May 2010 (Melbourne Bike Share), Minneapolis in June 2010 (Nice Ride Minnesota), London in July 2010 (Barclays Cycle Hire), Washington, D.C. in August 2010 (Capital Bikeshare) and Boston in July 2011 (Hubway).

==== Dispute with SVLS ====
In January 2012, SVLS informed 8D Technologies that it would stop using the 8D platform, accusing 8D of overbilling for its technology. According to a Radio-Canada report, the decision to unilaterally cut ties with 8D Technologies was taken more than six months earlier, in June 2011, by the SLVS board of directors. Instead of using the 8D software, SVLS would develop its own platform through American firm Personica Intelligence. The decision would effectively prevent 8D from participating in future Bixi installations, such as the planned expansions in Chattanooga and New York City. 8D would however continue to be the technology supplier for the existing BIXI-based systems. In April of the same year, 8D Technologies filed a lawsuit, seeking $26 million in damages from SVLS. SVLS in turn sued 8D for $2 million shortly after.

==== SVLS bankruptcy ====
The software developed by SVLS to replace the 8D system experienced problems early on in Chattanooga, Chicago, and New York. On July 20, 2012, New York City Mayor Michael Bloomberg declared that delays in the launch of New York's bike-share program were caused by software problems. The Citi Bike program finally launched 10 months later, in May 2013, but still experienced technical difficulties. As a result, New York and Chicago withheld payments to SVLS. Mired in financial problems, SVLS sought protection under the Bankruptcy and Insolvency Act on January 20, 2014.

=== Post-BIXI ===
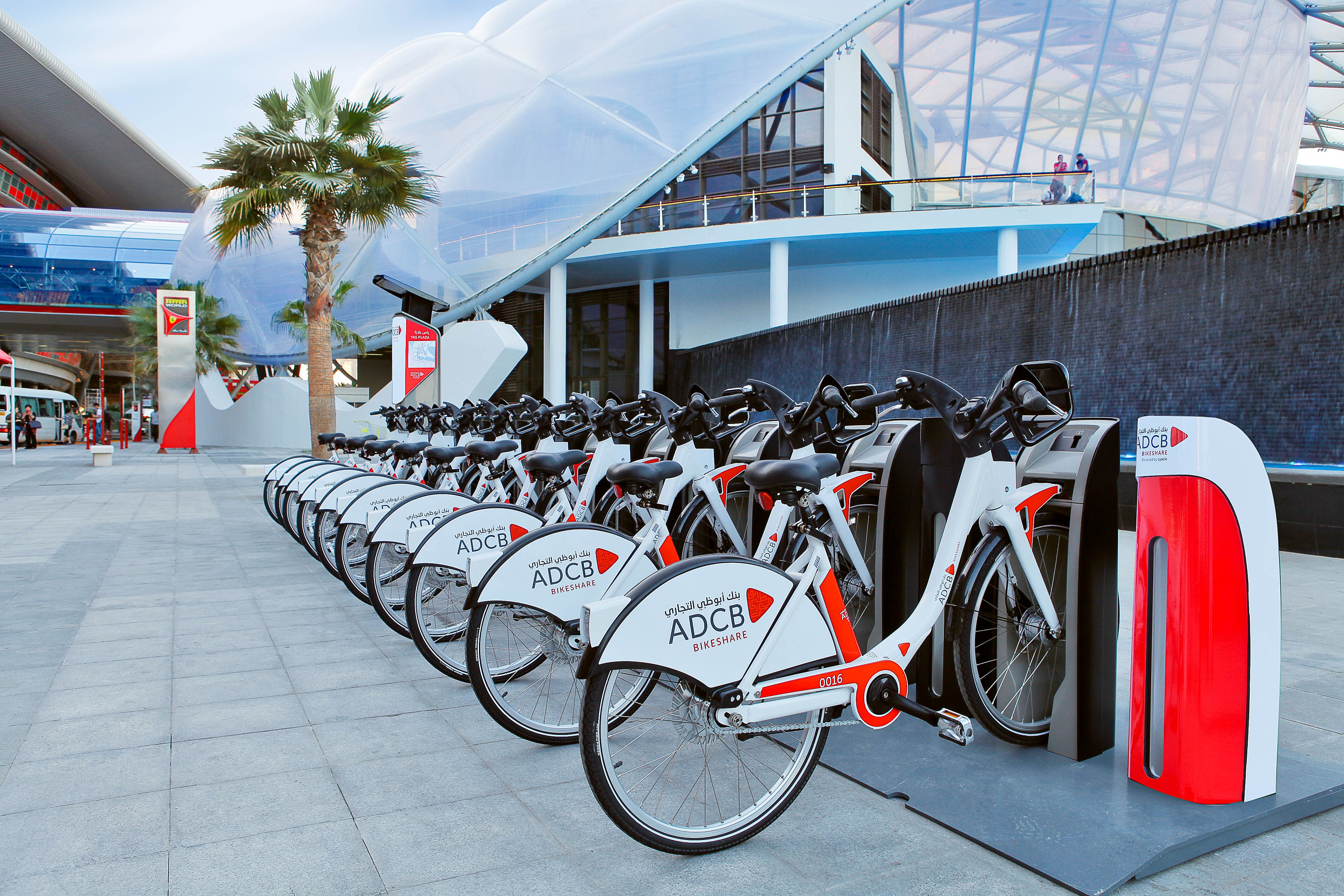
8D Technologies bike station for ADBC Bikeshare in Abu Dhabi.

Less than a month after BIXI declared bankruptcy, 8D Technologies formed a partnership with Alta Bicycle Share (now Motivate), the company that operated most of the bike share programs running systems sold by BIXI. This newly formed alliance between two former SVLS partners was selected by Seattle to replace the bankrupt entity as the supplier for the planned bike share program in the city. Seattle's Pronto Cycle Share was eventually launched in October 2014, becoming the first deployment of 8D Technologies' BSSv4 bike share system, for which 8D manufactured the entire solution (docking stations and terminals), in addition to providing the software platform. December 2014 marked 8D's first foray into Asia, with the launch of ADBC Bikeshare in Abu Dhabi.

==== Citi Bike ====
Prior to the Seattle system launch in Fall 2014, 8D's BSSv4 system was initially tested in Brooklyn, New York, for the Citi Bike program. These tests paved the way for the replacement of SVLS' buggy software for Citi Bike by the 8D system, which took place in March 2015. 8D Technologies also replaced docking technology and bike station embedded systems. It was also announced that Citi Bike would add 92 new BSSv4 bike stations. This first expansion for the two-year-old program took place in August 2015.

=== Merger ===
In February 2017, 8D Technologies announced that it was merging with Motivate, with Jay Walder as the CEO of the combined company.

== Locations ==
=== Bike share systems ===
==== Current locations ====
These are bike share systems that are currently operating using the 8D Technologies platform.

City	Program	Operation period	Launch date	Stations	Bikes
Montreal, Canada	BIXI	Seasonal	May 2009	460	5200
(United States) Minneapolis, Minnesota	Nice Ride Minnesota	Seasonal	June 2010	190	1700
(United Kingdom) London	Santander Cycle Hire	Year-round	July 2010	785	11500
(United States) Pullman, Washington (Washington State University)	WSU Green Bike	Year-round	August 2010: June 2018	11	100
(United States) Washington, D.C.	Capital Bikeshare	Year-round	September 2010	370	3100
(United States) Boston, Massachusetts	Blue Bikes	Year-round	July 2011	160	1600
(United Arab Emirates) Abu Dhabi	ADBC Bikeshare	Year-round	December 2014	11	75
(United States) New York City, New York	Citi Bike	Year-round	March 2015 (Initial launch May 2013)	706	12000
(United States) Jersey City, New Jersey	Citi Bike Jersey City	Year-round	September 2015	35	350
(United States) San Francisco Bay Area (California)	Ford GoBike / Bay Wheels	Year-round	June 2017 (initial launch 2013)	550	7000
(United States) Chicago, Illinois	Divvy	Year-round	June 2017 (initial launch June 2013)	608	5800

==== Former locations ====
City	Program	Using 8D Software
Toronto, Canada	Bike Share Toronto	2011-2016
Ottawa, Canada	Capital Bixi	2009-2014
(United States) Seattle, Washington	Pronto Cycle Share	October 2014 - March 2017
Melbourne, Australia	Melbourne Bike Share	May 2010 - November 2019

=== Automated parking management ===
==== Current location ====
City	Program	Launch date	Stations	Parking spaces
Montreal, Canada	Stationnement de Montréal	2002	1515	22214

== Technology ==
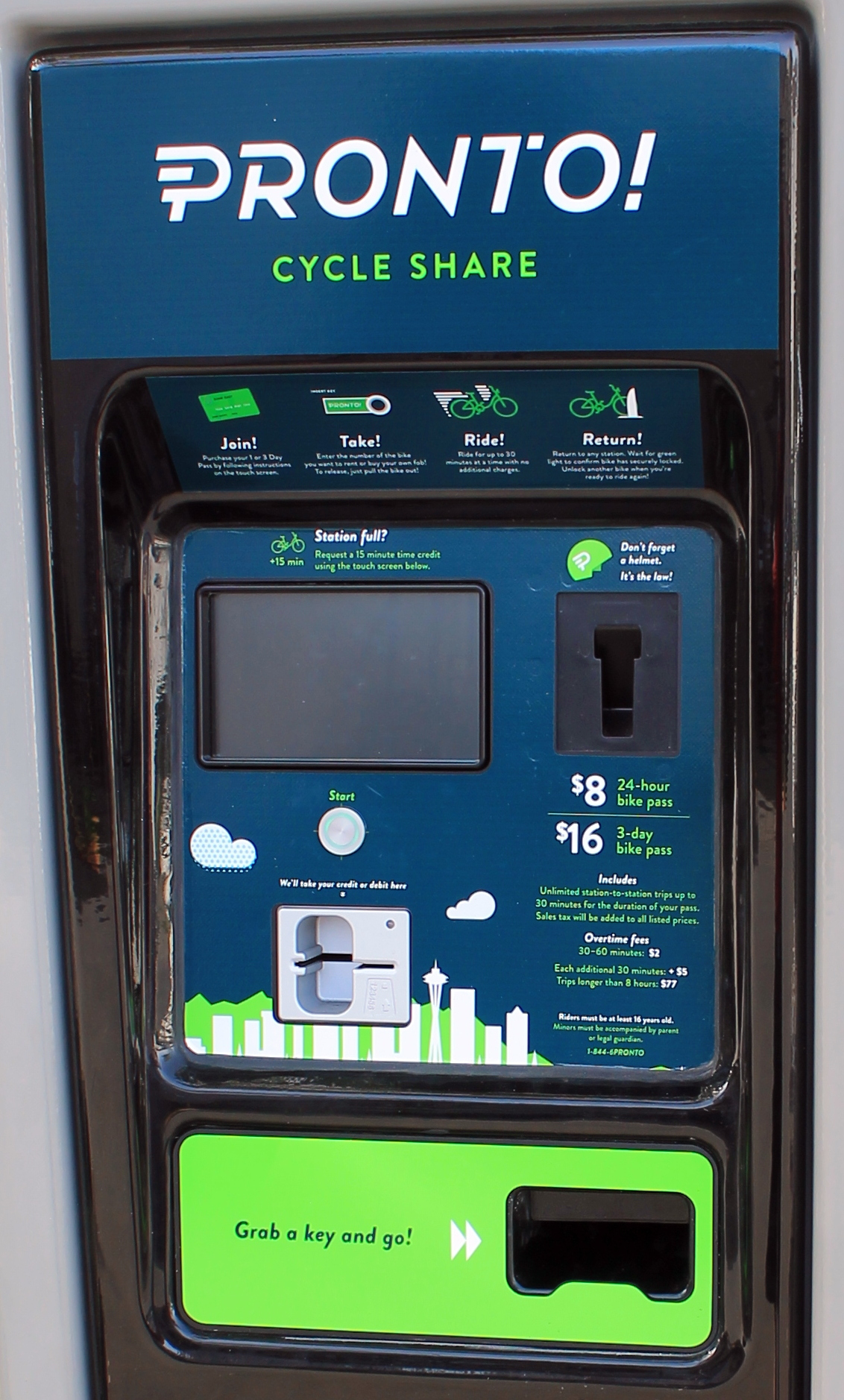
8D bike station for Pronto Cycle Share (with a bike key dispenser in the bottom right).

=== Cloud9 ===
Cloud9 is a Java-based operating environment introduced by 8D in 2001. It was presented at the Consumer Electronics Show in 2002. This proprietary platform equips embedded units in parking and bike share terminals produced by 8D.

=== 8D ECO Unit ===
The ECO device is a Linux-based embedded system unit that is the core of 8D's terminals. It is an integrated unit developed by 8D to provide secure wireless communications, real-time electronic payment management, components control and power management to point-of-sales terminals. The ECO module also allows remote control of terminals. It was initially deployed in 2003 on the first automated parking management terminals installed in Montreal. ECO stands for electronic commerce.

=== Bike Key Dispensing Unit ===
In 2014, 8D Technologies developed the world's first bike key dispensing terminal, which was installed for the program Nice Ride Minnesota in September of that year. The bike key dispenser enables users to purchase a bike key directly at a terminal instead of receiving it in the mail. 8D bike key dispensers have since been installed in every North American city bike share program powered by 8D, as well as in Abu Dhabi
