= Robotics Design Inc. =

Canadian robotics company

- Type: Private
- Industry: Robots
- Founded: 1997
- Founder: Charles Khairallah
- Headquarters: Montreal, Quebec, Canada
- Products: Mobile robots Industrial robots Modular robots Hyper-redundant robots Ergonomic arms
- Website: www.roboticsdesign.qc.ca

Robotics Design Inc. is a company that designs and builds modular robots, founded and incorporated in Montreal, Quebec, Canada, in 1997.

== Background ==
The company developed the BIXI bike dock, a public bike system, and the Automatic Deployable Container, a deployable structure container for quick deployment of housing, hospitals and other buildings.

== History ==
The company launched its first ANATROLLER robot in 2003, the ANATROLLER ARI-100. Later, in 2010 the Kel'air duct cleaning company, a French company based in Bordeaux, acquired one of these, the first in the European market. The ANATROLLER ARI-100 is an industrial robot used primarily for duct cleaning.

In 2010, the company's ANAT technology was recognized as a nominee for the 2010 Manning Innovation Awards.

The company's first portable Anatergoarm model, the TMA-500, was deployed in 2010 at Hydro Quebec's Robert-Bourassa generating station for breaking unit repairs. It won the IRSST's 2011 "Work health and safety innovation" award at the 21st edition of the innovation awards organized by ADRIQ and its partners.

The Anatergoarm AEA-15 a manual arm designed in collaboration with Michel Dallaire Design Industrielle, won the gold medal at the 31st international Geneva Exhibition in 2015 and a finalist in IDM.

== Awards ==
=== BIXI ===
BIXI Montréal, utilizing Robotics Design Inc.’s modular docking station, was named the 19th best invention of 2008 by Time magazine.
