= CoGo =

Bike sharing system in Columbus, Ohio

CoGo Bike Share

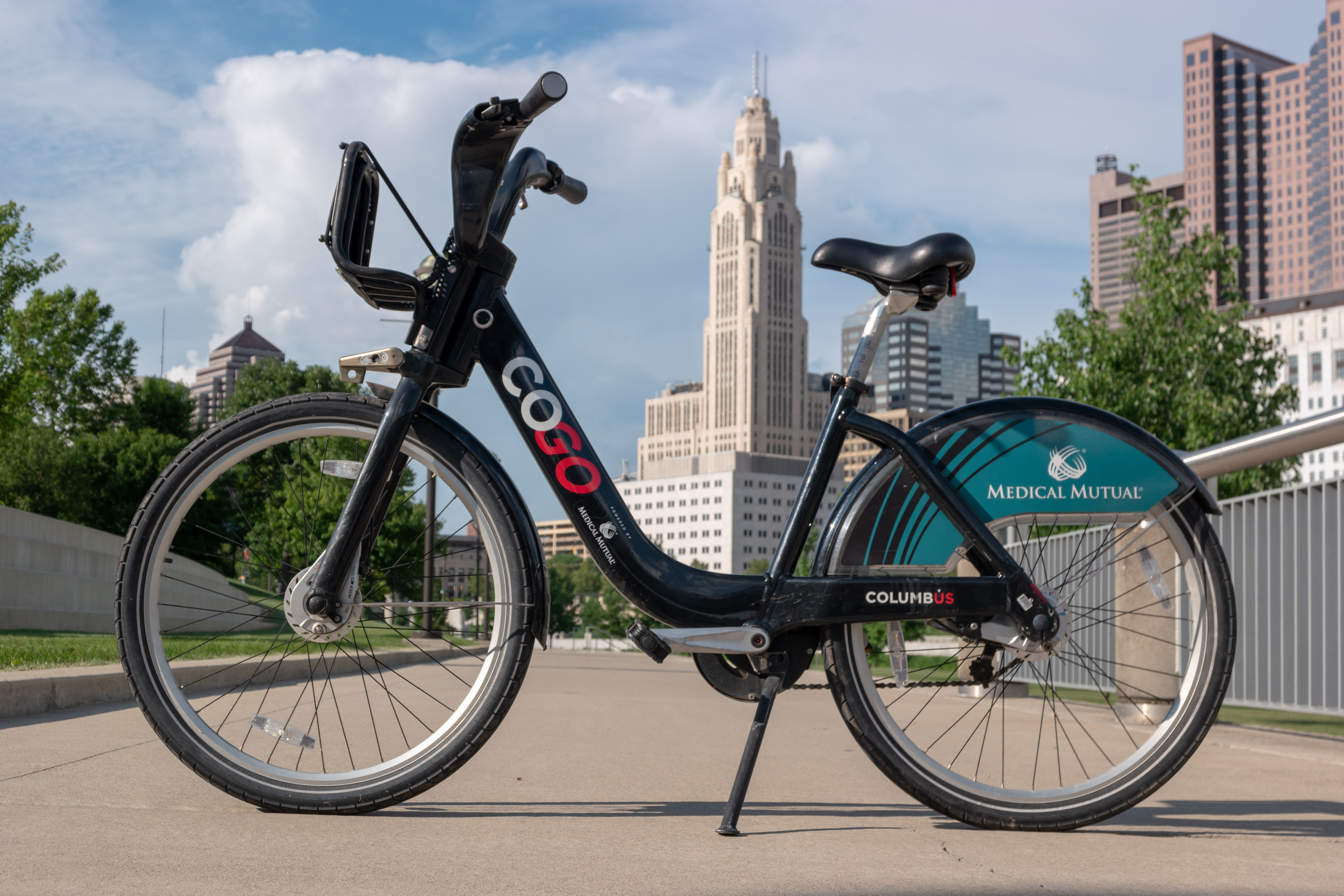

Overview
- Owner: City of Columbus
- Area served: Columbus metropolitan area
- Transit type: Bicycle-sharing system
- Number of stations: ~80
- Website: www.cogobikeshare.com

Operation
- Began operation: July 30, 2013; 13 years ago
- Operator: Motivate (Lyft)
- Number of vehicles: ~600
Interactive map of docking stations

CoGo Bike Share is a public bicycle sharing system serving Columbus, Ohio and its suburbs. The service is operated by the bikeshare company Motivate (part of Lyft, Inc.) It was created in July 2013 with 300 bikes and 30 docking stations, since expanded to about 600 bikes and 80 stations. The service is operated in conjunction with the City of Columbus, which owns all equipment. CoGo officially shut down operations in Spring 2025.

== History ==
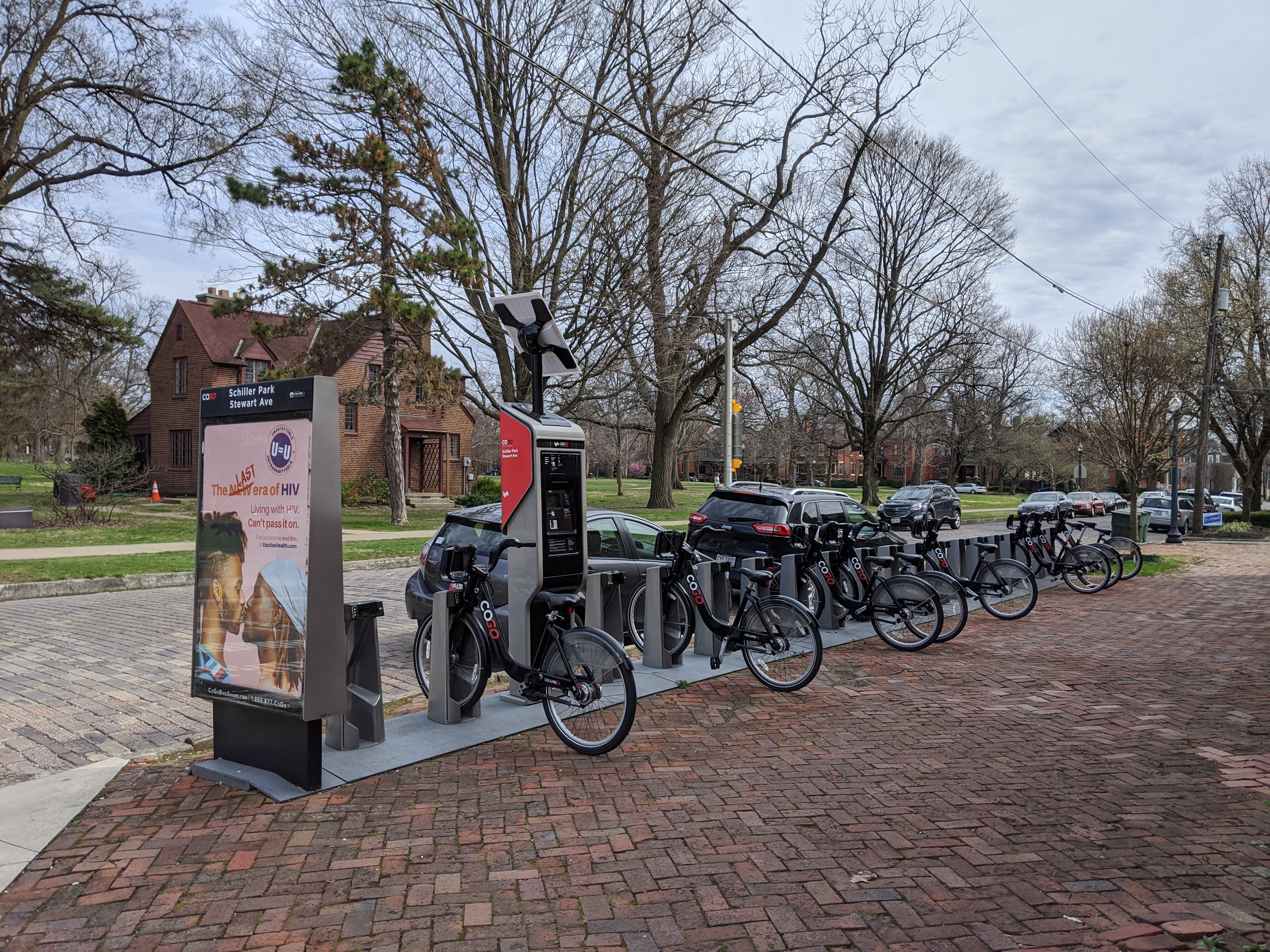
Station by Schiller Park

CoGo Bike Share was launched on July 30, 2013 in Columbus. It opened with 300 bikes and 30 docking stations in downtown and surrounding areas, operated by Alta Bicycle Share (since rebranded as Motivate). The bikes and stations were designed and constructed by PBSC Urban Solutions. The network's original boundaries were Second Avenue north of downtown, Parsons Avenue east of downtown, south to German Village, and west to Route 315. The City of Columbus provided a subsidy for CoGo's first year with an initial $2.3 million investment in equipment, though afterward the program became self-sustaining. In 2015, the city purchased 110 bikes and 11 stations to expand to the Near East Side, Weinland Park, and the southern end of the Ohio State University campus.

In 2015, Ohio State University launched a 115-bicycle, 15-station system on its campus. The university decided not to integrate with the city's CoGo system, instead utilizing Zagster to operate its system. The city had desired a unified system, though the university preferred Zagster's cost and variety of bike models. The program would include commuter, tandem, handle cycle, electric assist, heavy duty, and three-wheeled cargo bicycles as part of its system.

In 2016, the system became the second in the United States to utilize Transit app payments. After a pilot in Aspen, Colorado, Transit began offering its payment system to CoGo, allowing riders to unlock bikes using their smartphones. In late 2019, after CoGo's operator was purchased by Lyft, the latter company announced it was revoking use of the Transit app, forcing users to utilize its Lyft app to unlock bikes on smartphones.

== Company ==
The service is operated by the bikeshare company Motivate, part of Lyft, Inc. since 2018.

== Bikes ==
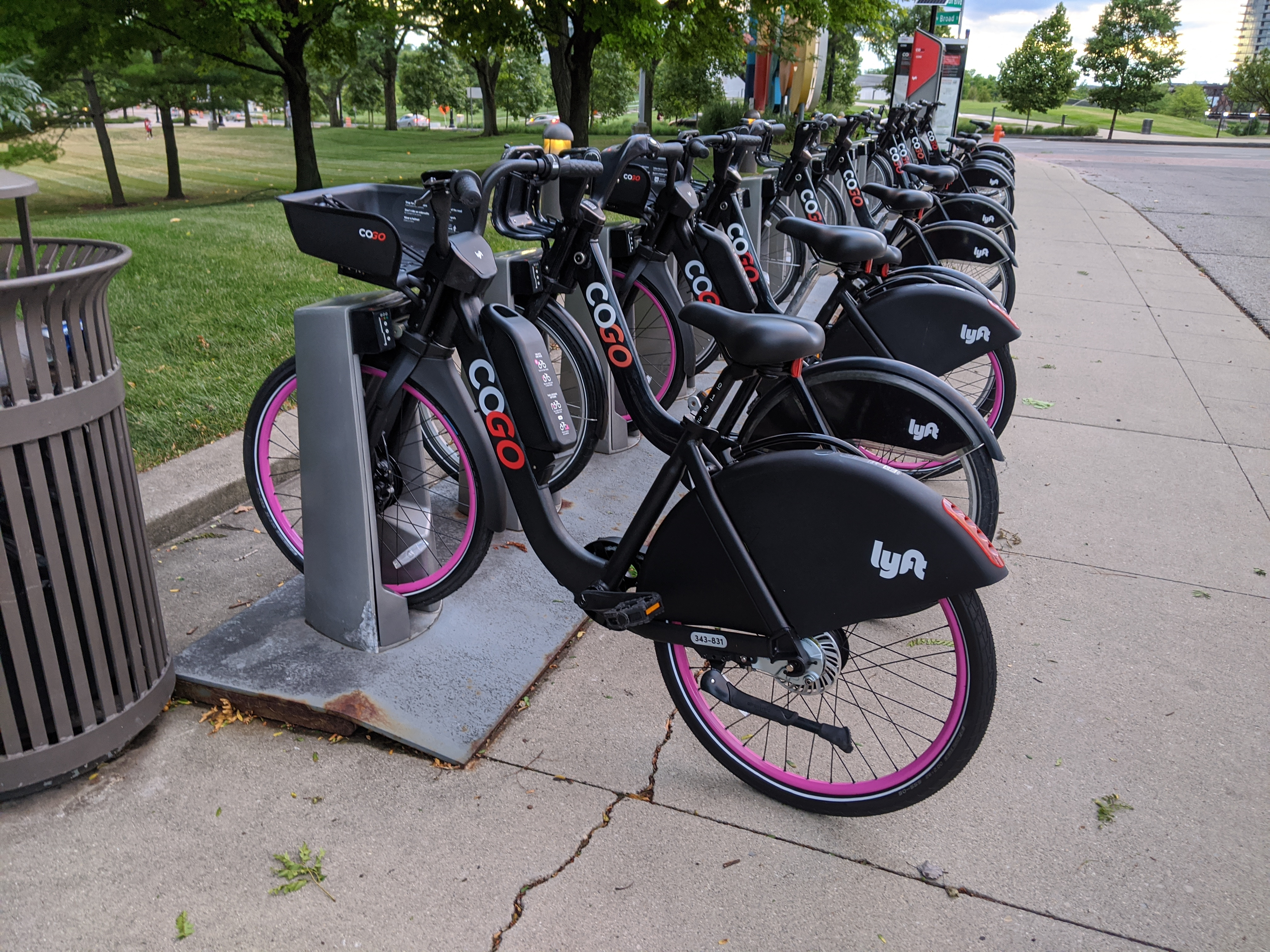
CoGo electric bicycles

CoGo maintains approximately 600 bicycles across the city. The City of Columbus owns all equipment, contracting the operations to Lyft. E-bikes were added to the system in June 2020.

== Payment ==
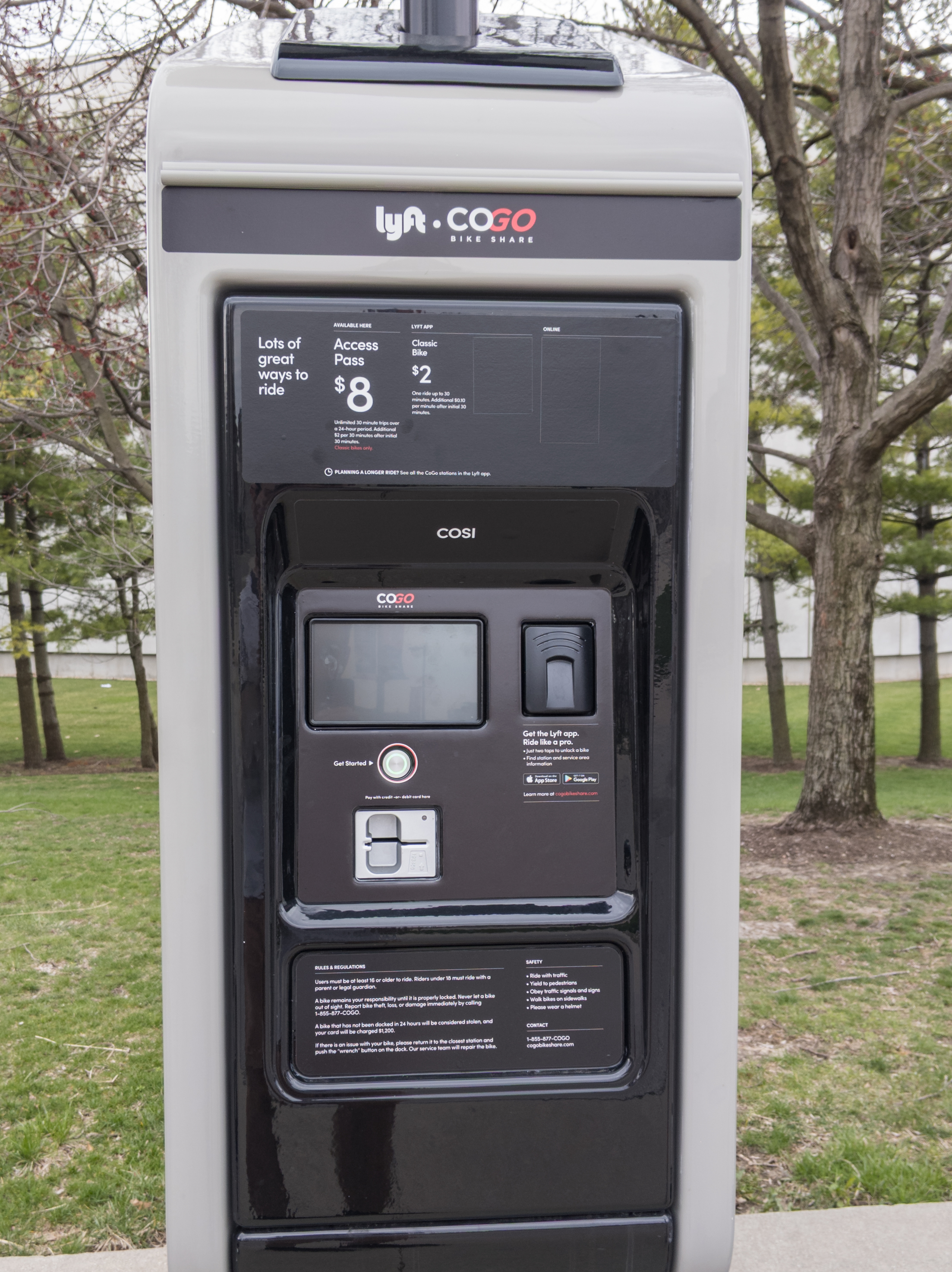
Kiosk at a docking station

The bikes are available for short term rental, using a credit card or member key fob. Additionally, the Lyft app allows users to unlock bikes with their smartphones.

The payment system is broken down into several options (pricing as of January 2025):

- Single fare: $2.25 per ride up to 30 minutes, then $.15/min for classic bikes. E-bikes have a $.15 fee per minute beginning with the first minute.
- Day pass: single $8 charge/day provides unlimited rides up to 30 minutes, then $.15/min for classic bikes. E-bikes have a $.15 fee per minute beginning with the first minute.
- Annual membership: $85 per year for unlimited rides. After 45 minutes, classic bikes incur a $.10 additional fee per minute. E-bikes have a $.10 fee per minute beginning with the first minute.
- CoGo for All: $5 annual membership for unlimited 45-minute rides. E-bikes have a $.05 fee per minute (program requires the renter receive SNAP benefits, WIC, Medicaid, FAFSA, or discounted utility payments).
- Note: parking e-bikes in public bike racks (as opposed to a docking station) carries a $1 fee.

== Program awards ==
The CoGo program has been recognized with several awards:

- Voted Columbus' 2013 Best Alternative Transportation by Columbus Underground
- Ohio Bicycle Federation's 2014 Horace Huffman Award
- Ohio Chapter of the American Society of Landscape Architects (OCASLA) 2014 Ohio Landscape Architecture Award

== See also ==
- List of bicycle-sharing systems
