= Bixi (bicycle share system) =

Public bicycle sharing system in Canada

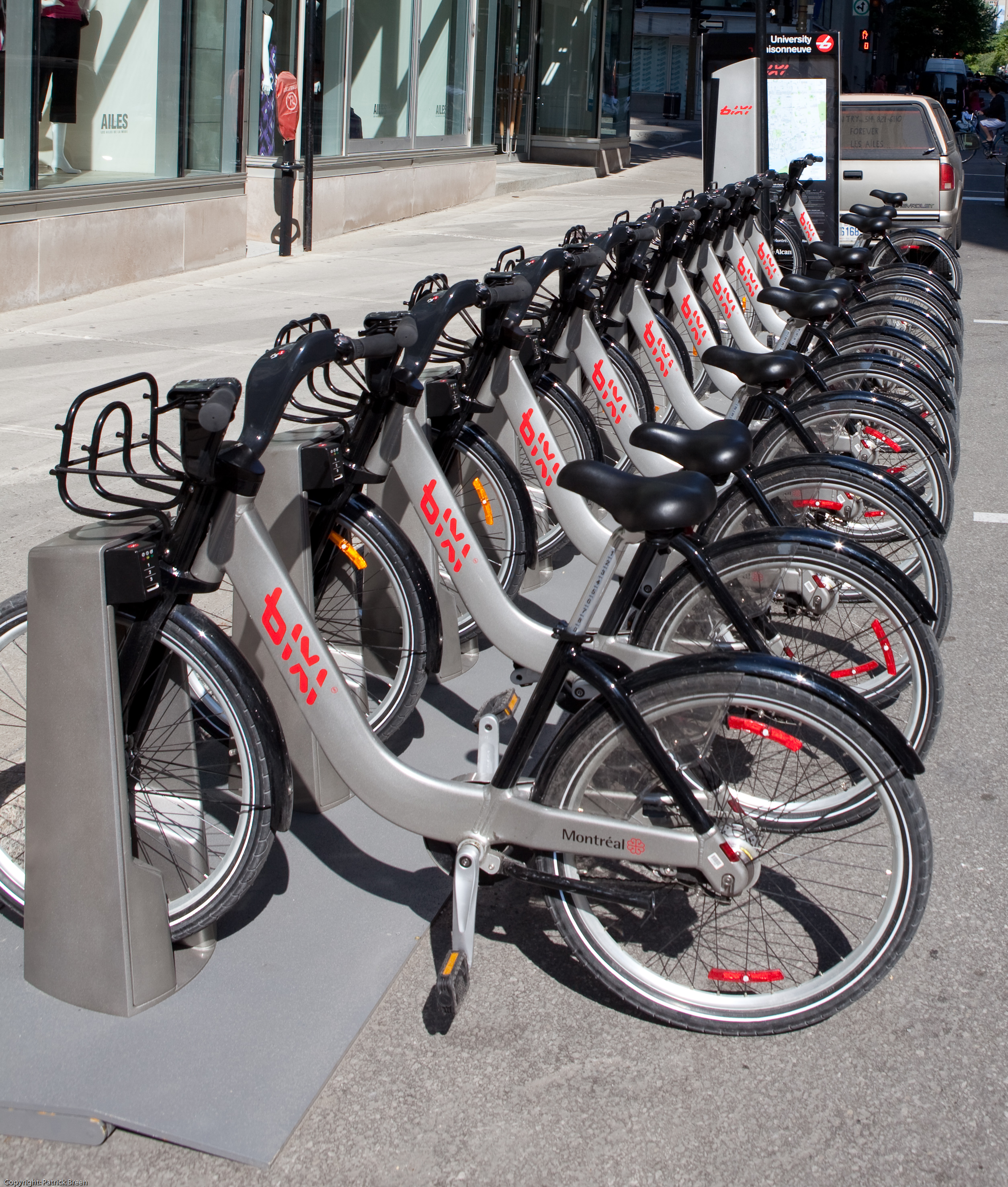
- Bixi station

Overview
- Owner: City of Montreal
- Locale: Greater Montreal and Sherbrooke, Quebec
- Transit type: Bicycle sharing system
- Number of stations: 900 (2024)
- Annual ridership: 13 million (2024)
- Website: https://bixi.com/

Operation
- Began operation: 2009
- Number of vehicles: 12,600, including 2,600 electric (2025)

Bixi is a public bicycle sharing system originally serving the metropolitan area of Montreal, Quebec, Canada. Starting July 2025, it also operates in the city of Sherbrooke.

Launched in May 2009 by Public Bike System Company (PBSC), it is North America's first large-scale bike sharing system and the original Bixi brand of systems. PBSC filed for bankruptcy at the beginning of 2014 after the company started experiencing financial difficulties in late 2013. The City of Montreal then bought PBSC's assets for $11.9 million in February 2014 and created Bixi Montréal, a non-profit entity, to run the bike sharing operations.

In 2023, Bixi was the second-most used bicycle sharing system in the U.S. and Canada, behind only the Citi Bikes of New York City, which are modelled after Bixi. In 2025, the magazine Time listed Bixi as one of the 25 best inventions of the 21st century, citing its innovative design and influence on other major bicycle sharing programs.

== Name ==
"Bixi" is a portmanteau of "bicyclette" (French for "bicycle") and "taxi", underlining the concept of being able to hail a bicycle just like a taxi. The name was coined by Michel Gourdeau, who won a public competition to find the best name for the service when it was first introduced in Montreal. The prize for the winner was a Bixi pass for life.

== System components ==
A complete station is made up of a pay station and the bikes themselves, with each bike sitting in its own dock and the docks fitted into solar panel-powered modular platforms. These platforms are the base and electronic ports for pay stations and bike docks. Bike docks are used to store and lock bikes, and can receive bike returns.

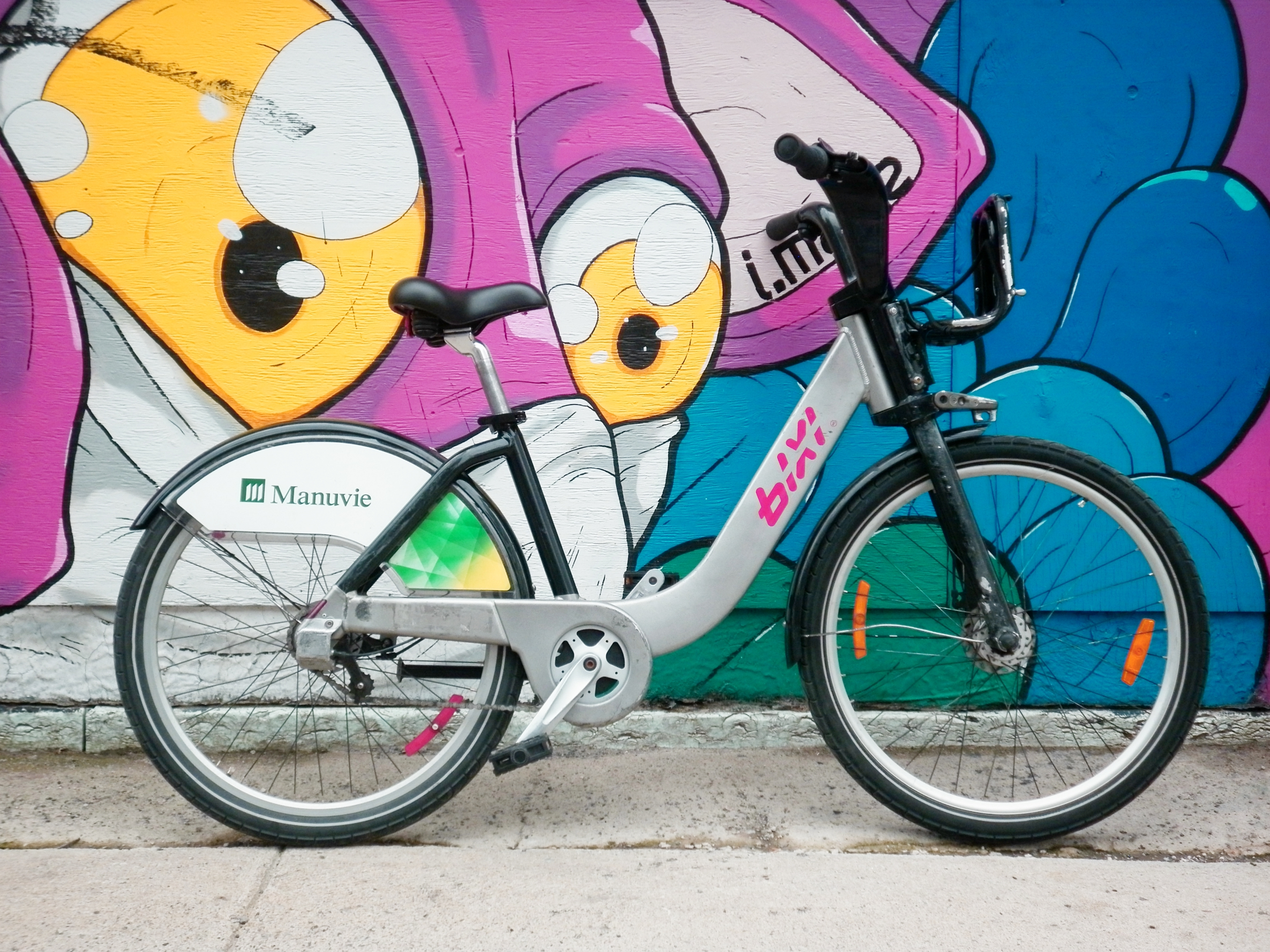
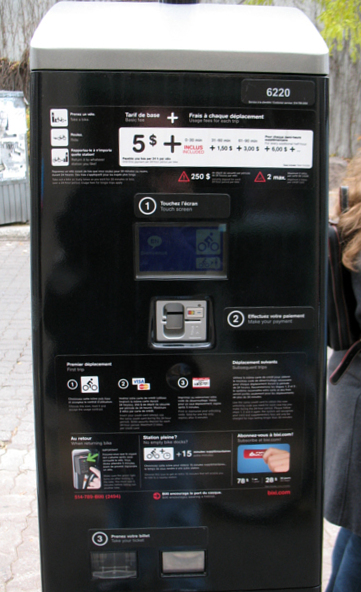
A Bixi bike and a pay station

The bicycles are utility bicycles with unisex step-through frames and three gears. The one-piece aluminum frame and handlebars hide cables in an effort to protect them from tampering and harsh weather conditions. The heavy-duty tires are designed to be puncture-resistant and are filled with nitrogen gas to maintain proper pressure for longer. Some bikes have studded tires for winter riding. Twin LED rear lights are found inside the frame, and the sturdy frame weighs approximately 18 kg (40 lb). White LED lights are found in the front of the bike. The bikes are built in Saguenay, Quebec, by Cycles Devinci. Blue electric bicycles were added to the Bixi fleet in 2019.

== Development ==
=== Stationnement de Montréal ===
The project was included in the transportation plan for the City of Montreal, which aimed at encouraging active modes of transportation, such as bicycle. The program is run by the city's parking authority, Stationnement de Montréal.

=== Other developers ===
- 8D Technologies developed the technological platform behind the Bixi system, including the wireless bike station terminals, RFID bike dock technology, and all software systems. The system runs on solar energy to reduce environmental impact and maximize energy efficiency. 8D also created the Spotcycle bike-share smartphone app that locates and shows the status of bike stations close to the users.
- Michel Dallaire created the design of the physical components.
- Robotics Design created the modular bike dock and intelligent locking system.
- Cycles Devinci manufactures Bixi bikes in the Saguenay-Lac-Saint-Jean region of Quebec.
- Rio Tinto Alcan is the title sponsor of the Bixi program and provides aluminum for the bikes.
- Morrow Communications.

== Station network ==
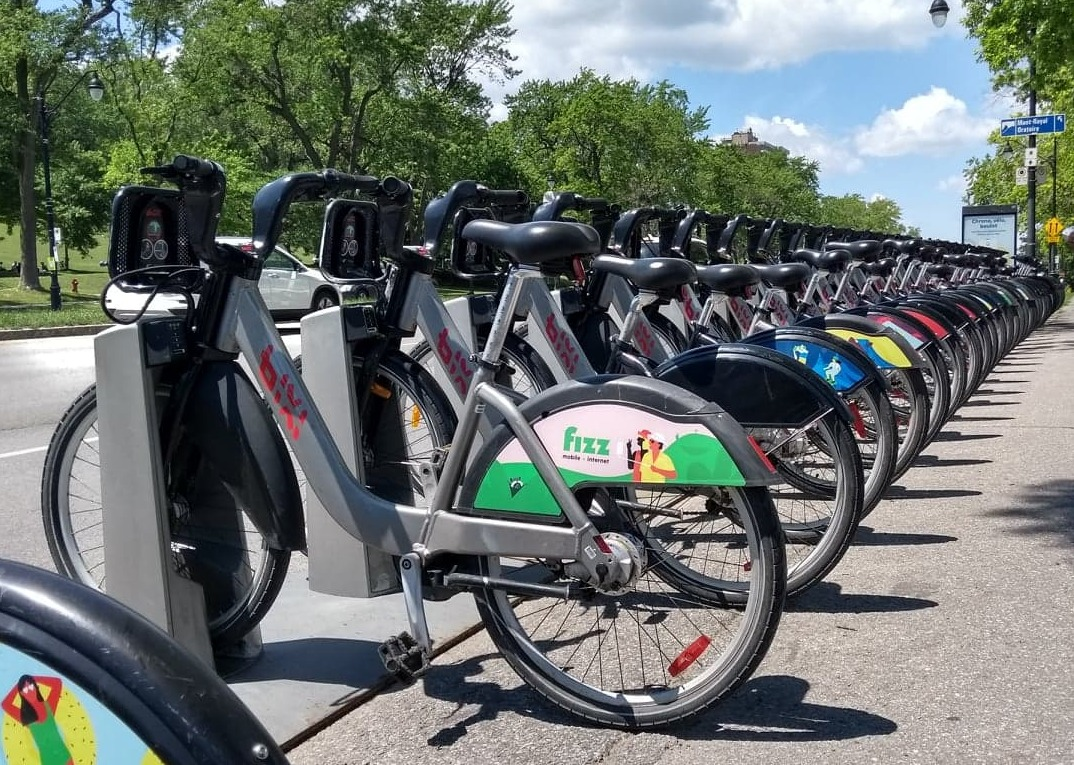
Parked Bixi bikes in Jeanne-Mance Park

The location of a Bixi bike station is determined by several parameters, including population density, points of interest and activities (e.g., universities), bike paths, other transportation networks, and data on travel patterns of the general public. In 2009, 3,000 bikes were deployed in Montreal through a network of 300 pay stations located mainly in the boroughs of Rosemont–La Petite-Patrie, the Plateau-Mont-Royal, and Ville-Marie, spilling over into parts of Outremont and the South West. As of 2024, the Bixi fleet has expanded to more than 11,000 bikes, about 2,600 of which are electric, in more than 900 stations. The network has spread outside of Montreal Island, with stations located in the suburban cities of Laval, Longueuil, Boucherville, Terrebonne and Sainte-Julie. Many stations are removed for the winter.

== Difficulties ==
Montreal's Bixi system experienced some initial difficulties less than two months after its introduction in 2009, with damage and vandalism to some of the bikes. La Presse reported on July 5, 2009, that one in five bikes had been damaged and 15% of bike racks had become defective. Stationnement de Montréal communications director Michel Philibert said that the organization planned to reinforce racks and was testing prototype designs. Designer Michel Dallaire said it never occurred to him that people would try to break the stations to steal bikes. Since then, there has been no significant damage or vandalism issues reported in any of the Bixi installations.

The program experienced several serious setbacks and obstacles during its lifetime, including mismanagement, breach-of-contract litigation, and the surmounting of debt, most notably when the City of Montreal was forced to sell the lucrative international division, eliminating the only part of the program that turned a profit. Eventually, this contributed to the company's filing for bankruptcy in January 2014. The international division was renamed PBSC Urban Solutions and continued to extend its activities in several countries, including United States, Canada, and Mexico.

== See also ==
- PBSC Urban Solutions
- Bicycle-sharing system
- List of bicycle sharing systems
- Utility cycling - Short-term hire schemes
