= Lyft Urban Solutions =

Bicycle-sharing system developer and supplier

PBSC Urban Solutions Inc.
- Formerly: Public Bike System Company; (Société de Vélo en Libre-Service)
- Type: Private
- Industry: Bicycle-sharing systems
- Founded: 2008; 18 years ago, in Montreal, Quebec, Canada; (as Public Bike System Company)
- Founder: Société en commandite Stationnement de Montréal (SCSM)
- Headquarters: Longueuil, Quebec, Canada
- Area served: Worldwide
- Brands: Iconic, Boost, Fit, E-Fit
- Owner: Lyft, Inc. (2022–present)
- Website: lyfturbansolutions.com

Lyft Urban Solutions, formerly PBSC Urban Solutions and originally Public Bike System Company, is an international bicycle-sharing system equipment vendor with their headquarters based in Longueuil, Quebec. The company develops bicycle-sharing systems, equipment, parts, and software, and sells its products to cities in Canada, the United States, the United Kingdom, Spain, Brazil and more. The company has sold about 280,000 bikes and 13,000 stations to 50 cities.

Public Bike System Company (PBSC) was initially created by the City of Montreal to supply and operate its public bike share system under the brand Bixi (later becoming Bixi Montréal), which was introduced in 2009. The name 'Bixi' is a portmanteau of 'bicycle' and 'taxi'. Starting in 2010, Lyft Urban Solutions began to export the Bixi brand of bike-share systems to various other cities.

Bruno Rodi purchased the international division in April 2014 for $4M and renamed the company to PBSC Urban Solutions. (Montreal's on-the-ground Bixi bike-share operations were not included in the sale, and were reorganized under the Bixi Montréal name.) In 2015, he sold the majority share to Luc Sabbatini, who became CEO.

On May 17, 2022, Lyft, Inc. acquired PBSC Urban Solutions for $160 million and rebranded the subsidiary to Lyft Urban Solutions.

== History ==
In 2007, the city of Montreal published the "Reinvent Montreal" transportation plan, which featured a bike sharing system as a method of reducing automobile dependence. To design and operate the new system, called Bixi, the city created the Public Bike System Company (PBSC). This was a private non-profit company overseen by Montreal's parking authority.

In May 2009, the system began operation in Montreal, with 3000 bicycles and 300 stations. After several expansions and the addition of electric bikes to the network, as of 2021 the Montreal system has 9,092 bikes and e-bikes and 750 stations.

From June to September 2009, the system was introduced in a pilot study in Ottawa/Gatineau. This was followed by operations in Melbourne from May 2010, Minneapolis from June 2010, and London from July 2010. PBSC launched on the Washington State University campus in August 2010, and in Washington, D.C. and Arlington under the name "Capital Bikeshare" in September 2010.

In 2011, PBSC expanded its operations to Boston under the name "Hubway" and in Toronto, under the name "Bike Share Toronto".

In 2012, PBSC expanded to Chattanooga.

In 2013, the company continued its expansion in the United States by implementing systems in Chicago, New York City, and Aspen, Colorado.

In 2014, PBSC expanded its activities to Guadalajara.

On January 20, 2014, the company filed for bankruptcy in Montreal, citing $46 million in debt, in part because Chicago and New York were withholding $5 million in payments because of software issues with the docking stations. In 2014, Bruno Rodi purchased the international division of Bixi and renamed it to PBSC Urban Solutions. Luc Sabbatini became CEO of the company in January 2015.

In 2015, PBSC Urban Solutions expanded to Toluca, and announced the expansion of its existing networks in London, Chicago, Washington and Guadalajara.

In 2016, PBSC Urban Solutions added pedal-assist electric bicycles to its fleets.

In 2017, the company deployed its first system in Brazil in the city of Recife, which consisted of 800 bikes and 80 stations. The company also launched operations in Detroit, Louisville, Tucson, and Honolulu in the United States, as well as Aruba in the Caribbean.

In 2018, the company launched in Valence, and Nicosia. Thanks to its partnership with Tembici and Itaú Unibanco operators, Lyft Urban Solutions expanded its network in Brazil with the deployment of 9,000 bikes in several cities: Rio de Janeiro, São Paulo, Porto Alegre, Vila Velha and Salvador.

In 2019, PBSC Urban Solutions was awarded a 7,000 bike contract in Barcelona, 1,000 of them being electric assisted bikes. The same year the company expanded to Monaco, Buenos Aires, and Santiago. It also extended some of its existing systems, including BIXI in Montreal, We-Cycle in Aspen and Libélo in Valence.

In 2020, PBSC Urban Solutions entered the Middle East with the launch of Careem Bike, a fully electric system, in Dubai. In the same year, it also expanded to San Sebastian.

In 2021, PBSC Urban Solutions broadened its activities in several cities around the world: Abu Dhabi, Clermont-Ferrand, Sibiu, Quebec City and Brasilia.

In 2022, the company launched systems in Colombia and Romania, as well as in the cities of Pittsburgh, Bogota, Dej, and Sibiu. It also expanded some of its existing networks, including BIXI in Montreal, Careem Bike in Dubai, Santander Cycles in London, Bike Share Toronto in Toronto, Biki in Honolulu, àVélo in Québec City, Bike Itau in São Paulo, and Libélo in Valence.

On April 19, 2022, Lyft announced that it had reached an agreement to acquire PBSC Urban Solutions. The transaction closed on May 17, 2022, and the company was rebranded Lyft Urban Solutions.

In 2023, Lyft Urban Solutions launched bicimad, a fully electric system in Madrid, Spain, and Biki in Valladolid, Spain.

== Original developers ==
- 8D Technologies developed the technological platform behind the Bixi system, including the wireless bike station terminals, the RFID bike dock technology and the software systems. The system runs on a combination of solar energy and grid charged batteries. 8D also created the Spotcycle bike-share smartphone app that locates and shows the status of bike stations close to the users.
- Michel Dallaire designed the physical components.
- Robotics Design designed the bike docks and the locking system.
- Cycles Devinci manufactures PBSC's bikes in the Saguenay–Lac-Saint-Jean region of Quebec.
- Michel Gourdeau suggested the name Bixi, a portmanteau of bicycle and taxi, which was selected by a majority of the people who participated in a contest organized by the city of Montreal.

== Current systems ==
The cities that currently use Lyft bike-share systems are listed below:

City	Country	Launch date	System name	Stations	Bikes
Abu Dhabi	United Arab Emirates	2021	Careem Bike	50	300
Aruba	Aruba	2017	Green Bike Aruba	8	100
Aspen/Basalt, Colorado	United States	2013	WE-cycle	90	520
Austin, Texas	United States	2024	CapMetro Bikeshare	76	494
Barcelona	Spain	2019	Bicing	519	7,000
Bogotá	Colombia	2022	Tembici	300	3,300
Boston, Massachusetts	United States	2011	Bluebikes	500	5,207
Brasília	Brazil	2021	Tembici	70	530
Buenos Aires	Argentina	2019	Ecobici	400	4,400
Chattanooga, Tennessee	United States	2012	Bike Chattanooga	43	458
Chicago, Illinois	United States	2013	Divvy	1,000	12,792
Clermont-Ferrand	France	2021	C.vélo	57	680
Columbus, Ohio	United States	2013	CoGo	91	522
Curitiba	Brazil	2023	Tembici	50	500
Dej	Romania	2023	Dej velo city	16	221
Detroit, Michigan	United States	2017	MoGo	79	679
Dubai	United Arab Emirates	2020	Careem Bike	175	1,750
Fort Worth, Texas	United States	2024	Trinity Metro Bikes	62	400
Guadalajara	Mexico	2014	MiBici	366	3,972
Honolulu, Hawaii	United States	2017	Biki	136	1,576
Hunedoara	Romania	2024	VeloCorvin	12	189
Kona, Hawaii	United States	2016	Hawaii Island Bikeshare	23	209
A Coruña	Spain	2022	bicicoruña	55	606
London	United Kingdom	2010	Santander Cycles	839	15,250
Madrid	Spain	2023	bicimad	611	7,500
Medina	Saudi Arabia	2024	Careem Bike	60	500
Moinesti	Romania	2024	Moinesti Bike City	8	121
Monaco	Monaco	2019	MonaBike	43	400
Montreal, Quebec	Canada	2009	Bixi Montréal	934	11,379
New York, New York	United States	2013	Citi Bike	2,099	42,542
Nicosia	Northern Cyprus	2018	Velespeed	43	410
Nordelta	Argentina	2022	Tembici	20	200
Pittsburgh	United States	2022	POGOH	82	583
Porto Alegre	Brazil	2018	Bike Itaú	59	665
Quebec City, Quebec	Canada	2021	àVélo	115	1,300
Rio de Janeiro	Brazil	2018	Bike Itaú	355	3,600
Salvador	Brazil	2018	Bike Itaú	50	400
San Sebastian	Spain	2011	Dbizi	70	724
Sântana	Romania	2022	Velo Sântana	8	90
Santiago	Chile	2019	Bike Santiago	230	3,501
São Paulo	Brazil	2018	Bike Itaú	320	3,700
Sibiu	Romania	2022	Sibiu Bike City	57	650
Toronto, Ontario	Canada	2011	Bike Share Toronto	925	9,750
Tucson, Arizona	United States	2017	Tugo	41	330
Valence	France	2018	Libélo	55	356
Valladolid	Spain	2023	Biki	97	1,678
Washington, D.C.	United States	2010	Capital BikeShare	769	11,746
Zaragoza	Spain	2025	[BiZi	276	

== Equipment ==
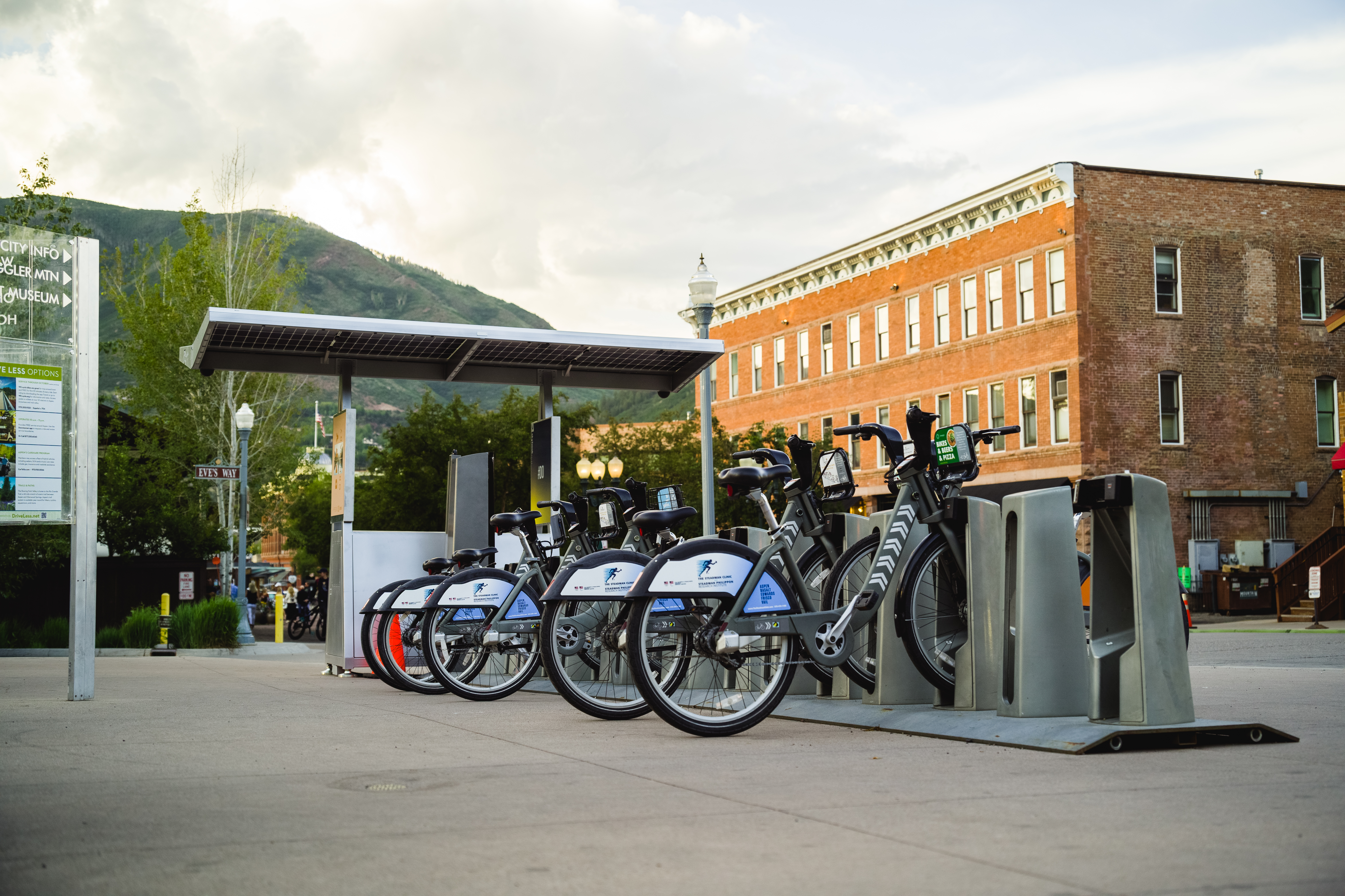
An e-bike dock in Aspen, CO powered by a Skyhook Solar Station.https://www.tbalcom.com/

A complete station is made up of a payment kiosk, bikes, and bike docks (where the bikes are locked). A station can be installed and configured in about half an hour; no excavation is required beforehand. Ordinary stations use solar power during the day and a rechargeable battery at night. Stations which can charge e-bikes, however, must be connected to an electrical power source.

In 2021, the We-Cycle in Aspen, Colorado began a pilot program with Skyhook Solar, utilizing solar charging stations to power e-bike docks and charge e-bikes. The program has been a success and We-Cycle has added Skyhook Solar Stations to several of its e-bike docks throughout the Roaring Fork Valley.

=== Bike docks ===
Bike docks hold and lock the bikes when they are not in use. Each dock includes a button which can be used to notify staff if a bicycle is defective. There are different types of stations:

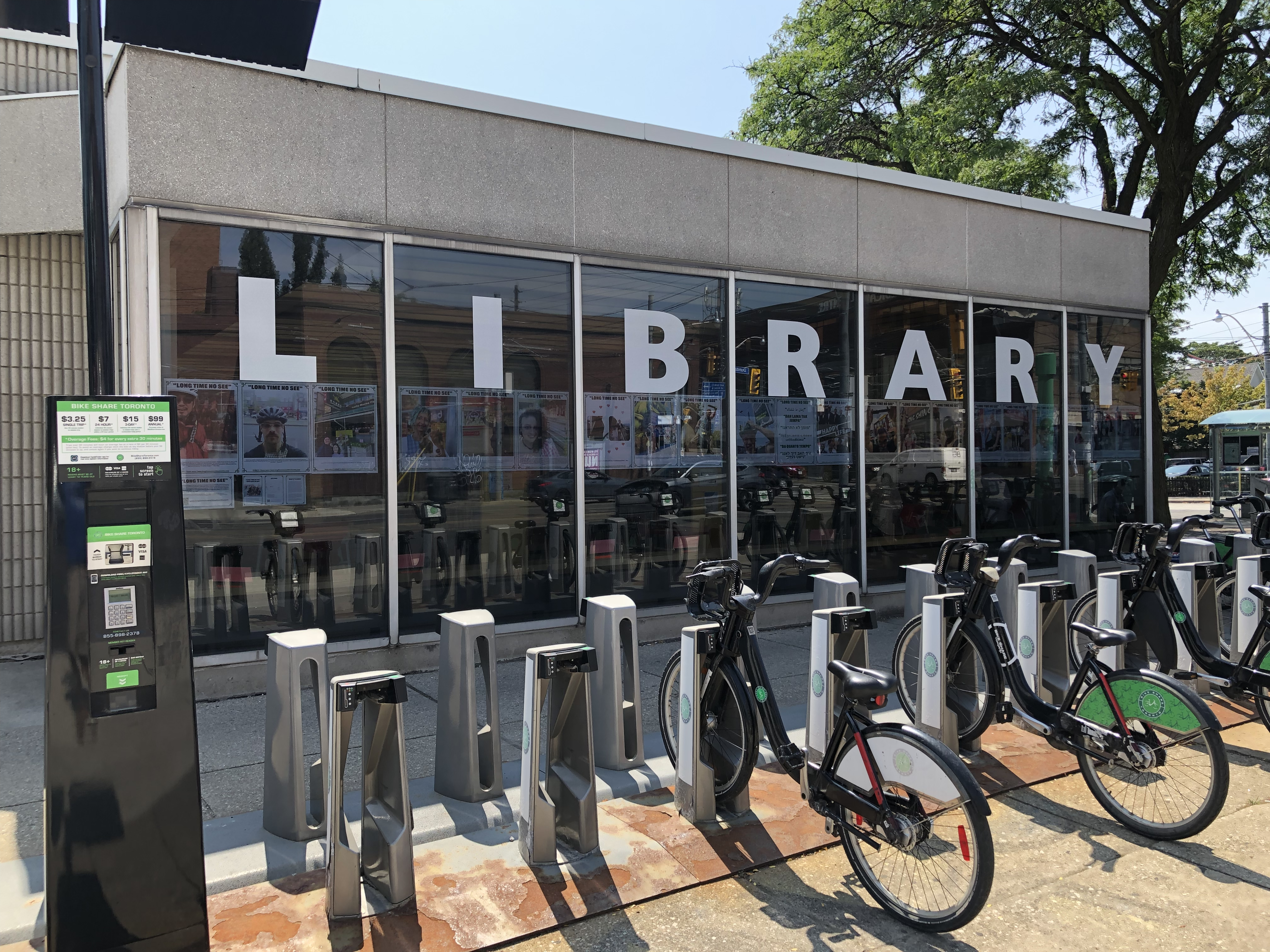
A Bike Share Toronto kiosk and station in Toronto.

- The electric stations which are powered by the electrical network and range from 100 V to 240 V.
- The solar stations which are modular and self-sufficient in energy.

=== Payment kiosks ===
PBSC's payment kiosks are touchscreen-operated; most of them accept credit cards for short-term rentals. Users can unlock bikes using a numeric one-time PIN generated by the payment kiosk or an app. Long-term subscribers also have the option to unlock a bike using a subscriber key, which works using contactless RFID ("tap") technology.

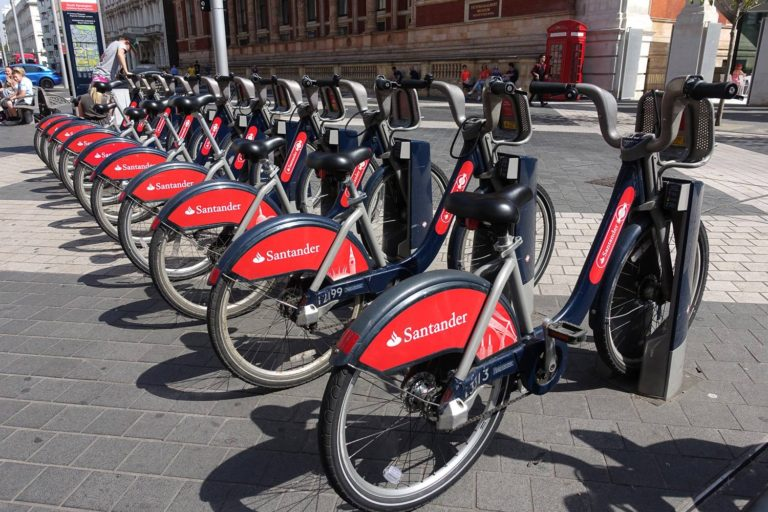
Santander Cycles station in London.

=== Bikes ===
The bicycles are utility bicycles; they have a unisex step-through frame with an upright seating position. They are equipped with grip-shifter-operated internally-geared hubs, drum brakes, mudguards/fenders, chain guard, generator lights, and a front rack.

The one-piece aluminum frame and handlebars conceal cables and fasteners, in an effort to protect them from vandalism and inclement weather. The tires are designed to be puncture-resistant and are filled with nitrogen to maintain proper inflation pressure longer. Twin LED rear lights are integrated into the robust frame, which weighs approximately 18 kg. The bikes were designed by Michel Dallaire; they are built in the Saguenay, Quebec region by Cycles Devinci.

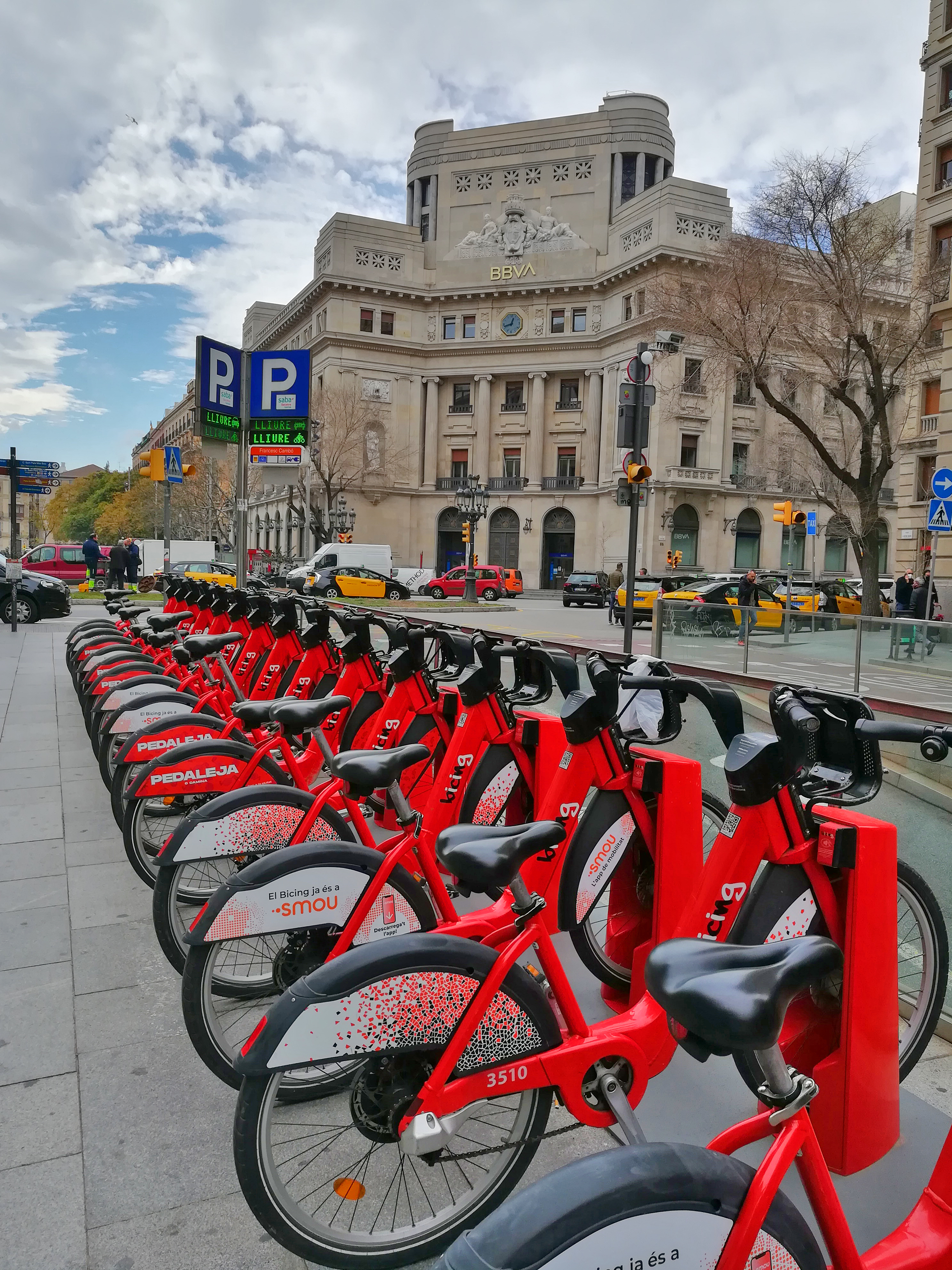
Bicing bikes in Barcelona

Four bike models are available. These include:

- The "ICONIC". This is PBSC's original bike model. It has 26" wheels, and is heavy but sturdy.
- The "FIT". This is a newer model. It is lighter-weight and has 24" wheels.
- The "BOOST". This is PBSC's original e-bike. The battery lasts for up to 60 km (37 mi) between charges.
- The "E-FIT". This is a newer e-bike. The battery lasts for up to 70 km (43 mi) between charges.

The "BOOST" and the "E-FIT" each include a 250 watt motor.

Each bike is also equipped with PBSC's patented anti-theft locking device. It can charge e-bikes batteries and communicate data in real-time to the control center.

== Multimodal solution ==
The multimodal solution is a technology designed to dock and charge various vehicles (bikes, e-scooters, e-bikes) at a single station, by installing PBSC's patented locking device on the vehicles.

== Technologies ==
=== PBSC mobile app ===
The official PBSC bicycle-rental app is now called "PBSC"; it was formerly called "CycleFinder". It can be used to unlock bikes (with the QR code), find nearby stations, find available bikes or empty docks, find a route to a destination, and more, all in real time.

The app can be customized to each city's operators.

=== Transit App ===
PBSC Urban Solutions also has a partnership with "Transit App"; this app can also be used to find stations and unlock bikes.

=== Comet ===
Comet is a software program developed by PBSC. The control center allows operators to manage in real-time the system as it is connected to every station and bike. The software shares data about the system's bikes and stations status (need for maintenance, station current capacity), location of bikes, user profile (regular or occasional users).

== 2014 bankruptcy ==
In 2013, PBSC began having financial problems; the company filed for bankruptcy in early 2014. In January 2014, Bixi filed for bankruptcy in Montreal, citing $46 million in debt. Part of the issue in the bankruptcy was that Chicago and New York were withholding $5 million in payments because of software issues with the docking stations. In February 2014, the city of Montreal bought all Bixi assets, with the intention of selling the international division of the bankrupt company. On April 9, 2014, Bruno Rodi, a Quebec businessman, bought Bixi's international division for $4 million and renamed it PBSC Urban Solutions.

== Operational difficulties ==
Several cities experienced hurdles in implementing Bixi systems.

A trial implementation in Ottawa and Gatineau took place in the summer of 2009, with 50 bikes and four stations available until September 2009. While the trial was successful, they did not return in 2010 since no company wanted to manage the project as the National Capital Commission wanted the contractor to buy the bicycles and locking stations. The project was revived, however, and 100 bikes and 10 stations were launched in spring 2011.

Bixi's franchise in central Boston includes the right to negotiate to expand the system to neighboring municipalities. Central Boston will be served by a network that includes 2,500 bikes, and 290 stations with 3,750 docking spaces, with the potential to expand to a 5,000-bike system. The system was delayed, partly because of a lack of funding, but launched in Spring 2011 with 610 bikes and 61 stations. It has since grown into the neighboring communities of Brookline, Cambridge and Somerville. They had initially planned to set up a Bixi system directly, but now are using Alta Bicycle Share, of Portland, Oregon, to set it up. Alta Bicycle Share uses the same bicycles and stations that are used in Bixi through the Public Bike System Company.

The Bixi system in Montreal experienced some initial difficulties less than two months after its introduction in 2009, with damage and vandalism to some of the bikes. The newspaper La Presse reported on July 5, 2009, that one in five bikes had been damaged and 15% of bike racks are defective. Stationnement de Montréal communications director Michel Philibert stated the organization plans to reinforce racks and is testing prototype designs. Designer Michel Dallaire stated it never occurred to him that people would try to break the stations to steal bikes. There have since been no significant damage or vandalism issues reported in any of the installations of Bixi.

In 2012 a legal dispute over software from 8D Technologies led to implementation delays for Chattanooga, New York and San Francisco.

In 2013 it was reported that the Toronto Bixi system was facing financial troubles and would be operated by Toronto Parking Authority in 2014 under a different name. The system had only paid back $600,000 of its $4,500,000 start up loan. The unexpectedly rapid expansion of export business created cash flow problems for the parent company, PBSC Urban Solutions, which attempted to sell its international operations in June.

== Effects ==
A study published in the American Journal of Public Health reports observing:

a greater likelihood of cycling for those exposed to the public bicycle-share program after the second season of implementation (odds ratio = 2.86; 95% confidence interval = 1.85, 4.42) after we controlled for weather, built environment, and individual variables.

In 2021, a study by Colorado State University in the United-States reported that the usage of bike share systems resulted in a calculated reduction of 4.7 premature deaths, 737 DALYS (disability-adjusted life years) and 36 million dollars (USD) in health economic impacts across the country annually.

== See also ==
- Alternatives to the automobile
- Sustainable transport
- Electric bicycle
- Road cycling
- Bicycle-sharing system
  - BCycle - owned by Wisconsin bicycle maker Trek, health insurer Humana, and advertising firm Crispin Porter Bogusky
  - List of bicycle-sharing systems
  - Utility cycling § Short-term hire schemes
  - Stockholm City Bikes (Stockholm, Sweden)
  - Vélib' (Paris, France)
  - Vélo'v (Lyon, France)
- Carsharing
- Outline of cycling
