= Cycling in London =

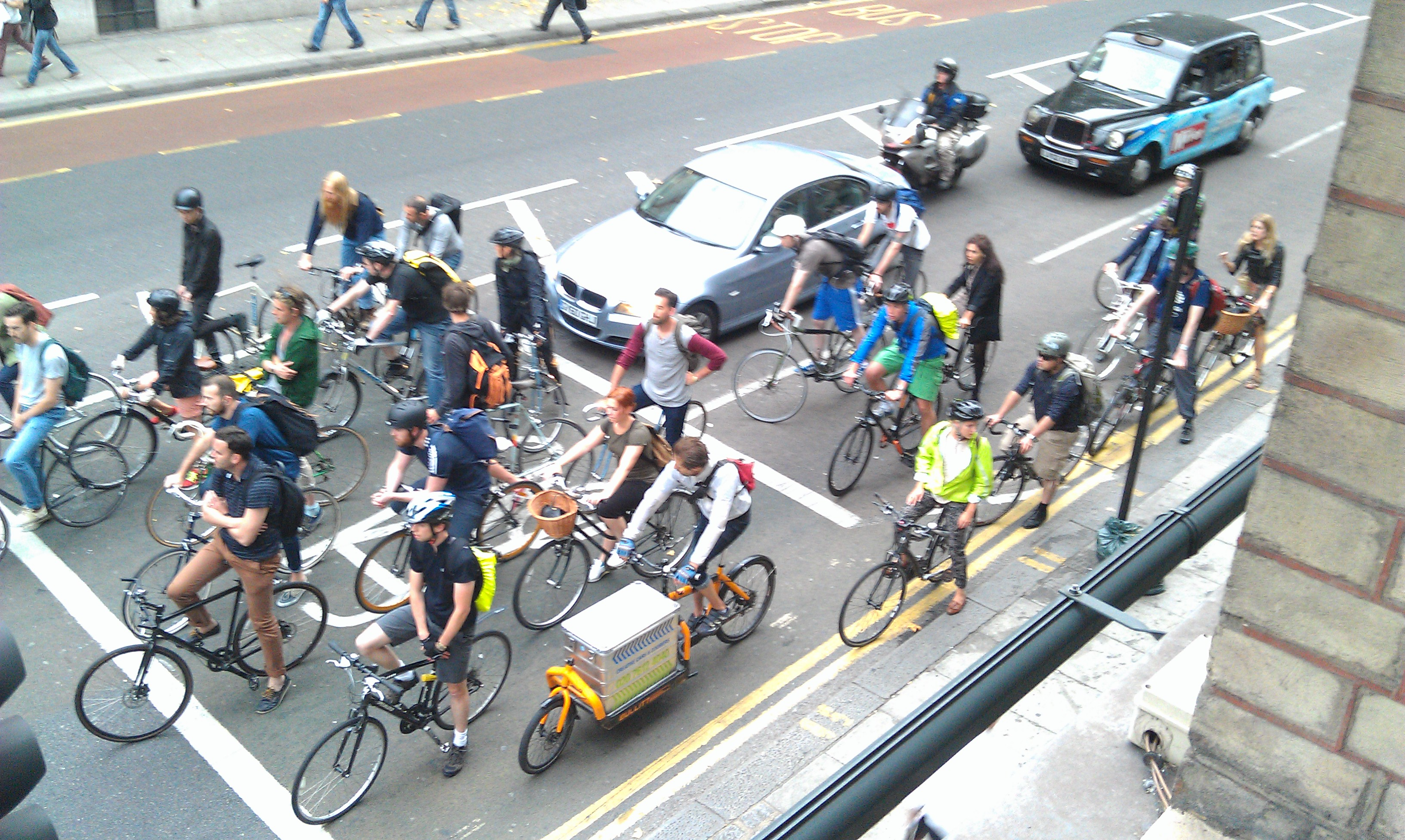
Utility cyclists during rush hour in the City

Cycling is a popular mode of transport and leisure activity within London, the capital city of the United Kingdom. Following a national decline in the 1960s of levels of utility cycling, cycling as a mode of everyday transport within London began a slow regrowth in the 1970s. This continued until the beginning of the 21st century, when levels began to increase significantly—during the period from 2000 to 2012, the number of daily journeys made by bicycle in Greater London doubled to 580,000. (Note: Daily journey figures from Transport for London.) and from 2012 to 2024 it doubled again to 1.3 million. This is partly attributed to the 2010 launch of a cycle hire system in Central London. By 2013, the scheme was attracting a monthly ridership of approximately 500,000, peaking at a million rides in July of that year. Health impact analyses have shown that London would benefit more from increased cycling and cycling infrastructure than other European cities.

Cycling conditions in the city have in recent years been perceived as unsafe by cyclists. A spate of cycling deaths in London occurred in November 2013, drawing criticism of TfL's cycle facilities and sparking protests and calls for safety improvements from politicians, cycling organisations and the media, as well as differing views on the extent to which poor cycling contributes to safety risks for both cyclists and other road users.

== History ==
=== 19th century ===
The popularity of cycling during the 19th century is in itself cyclical, consisting of several short periods of bicycle booms followed by a sharp decline in popularity.

Bicycles first made their way to London in 1818 via the carriage maker Denis Johnson, having imported and improved upon the original design by Karl von Drais, from which they acquired the name draisine, though its popularity among predominantly young male members of the aristocracy quickly gathered it the nickname 'dandy horse'. These designs lacked the pedals common to modern bicycles and were instead propelled by the action of the rider's feet on the ground. While briefly popular in the following years, slopes were challenging both to climb and descend, and riders were widely mocked in the streets and newspapers while the London College of Surgeons condemned the practice of cycling as dangerous. Its popularity soon fell out of fashion. In the following years a number of designs were proposed, tested, and built, attempting to remedy the drawbacks of the design, including tricycles and quadricycles, or the tandem bicycle. None gained widespread popularity.

It was not until the invention of the first 'true bicycles' in the 1860s, powered by the action of the rider's feet on two pedals driving a single wheel, did cycling gain significant popularity again. Originally called velocipedes, the lack of suspension, rough Victorian roads, and metal-rimmed tyres soon gathered them the nickname 'boneshakers'.

A further development was to move the rider directly above the forward wheel, allowing the rider to fully extend their leg with each cycle and thus deliver the most power, resulting in the ordinary bicycle, more commonly known as the penny-farthing. However, this made the machine dangerously unstable - in the event of an upset, the rider would likely be thrown forward over the handlebars. Consequently, its popularity lay predominantly among young middle and upper-class men who were more accepting of the risks. Older men, and women of all ages, preferred safer designs such as the tricycle, but the high cost conferred by the additional mechanical complexity meant that such machines were rarely seen. Among those who did ride, cycling developed as both a recreational and social activity, particularly among middle and upper class townsfolk taking advantage of their new machines to enjoy day trips through the nearby countryside. The village of Ripley, lying on the popular London to Winchester route, was declared "the Mecca of all good cyclists". Other popular destinations included Thames Ditton and Box Hill.

Some riders joined one of the many cycling clubs formed in this period. Club members would often ride together on shared excursions, often behind a recognised club Captain and his Lieutenants, with orders given by the club bugler or by whistle. Membership of such clubs could be exclusive, and the distinctive club uniforms conferred social opportunities even as a lone rider at the many rest stops.

The first recognisably modern bicycle, with equal-sized wheels and pedals driving the rear wheel via a chain mechanism, was the Rover safety bicycle of 1885. The invention of the pneumatic tyre in 1888 and the associated ride quality improvements only added to its popularity, triggering the third great bike boom which would last through the 1890s. First Battersea Park and then Hyde Park were popular with new cyclists seeking a space to learn to ride.

The introduction of the drop-frame bicycle in 1889, based on the design of the safety but without the crossbar between the rider's legs, allowed women to ride comfortably for the first time while wearing the long skirts typical of Victorian fashion. Cycling was one of the few activities a woman could take part in without a male chaperone, and while the bicycle changed how men took part in the same activities they had previously, for women the bicycle provided new opportunities and access to activities previously closed off to them, and from the image of women on bicycles enjoying their newfound freedom of movement outside the immediate proximity to the home emerged the image of the new woman. Several prominent feminist writers commented on the freedom the bicycle provided women and advocated others to take up riding. Susan Hamilton, Countess of Malmesbury, pronounced the sport "one of the greatest blessings given to modern women", and John Galsworthy would write the bicycle had "been responsible for more movement in manners and morals than anything since Charles the Second". Such changes did not come without significant pushback from more traditionalist factions. The female cyclist was seen as violating the separate spheres ideology prevalent at the time, and accused of attempting to become a man. Opposition ranged from satirical caricatures in the newspapers, to poor service provided at inns and cafes, to verbal and in some cases physical abuse directed at riders, including an instance of a meat hook thrown at a rider in Kilburn. Particular attention was directed towards riders dressed in rational dress, who rejected the traditional long skirts and corsets typical of Victorian women's fashion in favour of bloomers and other more practical forms of clothing especially suited to cycling. Despite the opposition, women continued to ride, with one in three bicycles ordered in 1895 placed by women.

=== 20th century ===
London's first segregated cycle track was introduced in 1934, between Hanger Lane and Greenford. Although the facility was well-used for cycling, segregation was opposed by cycling organisations at the time, fearing loss of rights to ride on the highway.

Beginning in the 1960s, Britain experienced a decline in levels of utility cycling due to the increasing wealth of its populace and greater affordability of motor vehicles; this in turn led to the favouring of vehicular traffic over other options by transportation planners. In 1977, the Conservative Party won the Greater London Council (GLC) election, and enacted policies that deprioritised spending on public transport.

In 1980 Ken Livingstone, at the time the Labour Party's transport spokesperson, made a promise to the London Cycling Campaign (LCC) that should Labour take control of the GLC they would spend more on the needs of cyclists. In May 1981, Labour won the GLC election, with Livingstone becoming GLC leader shortly afterwards. The following month, Livingstone announced that the GLC would accede to the LCC's demands, creating a cycling planning unit and spending at least 1% of the yearly transport budget, £2m, on cycling.

=== 21st century ===
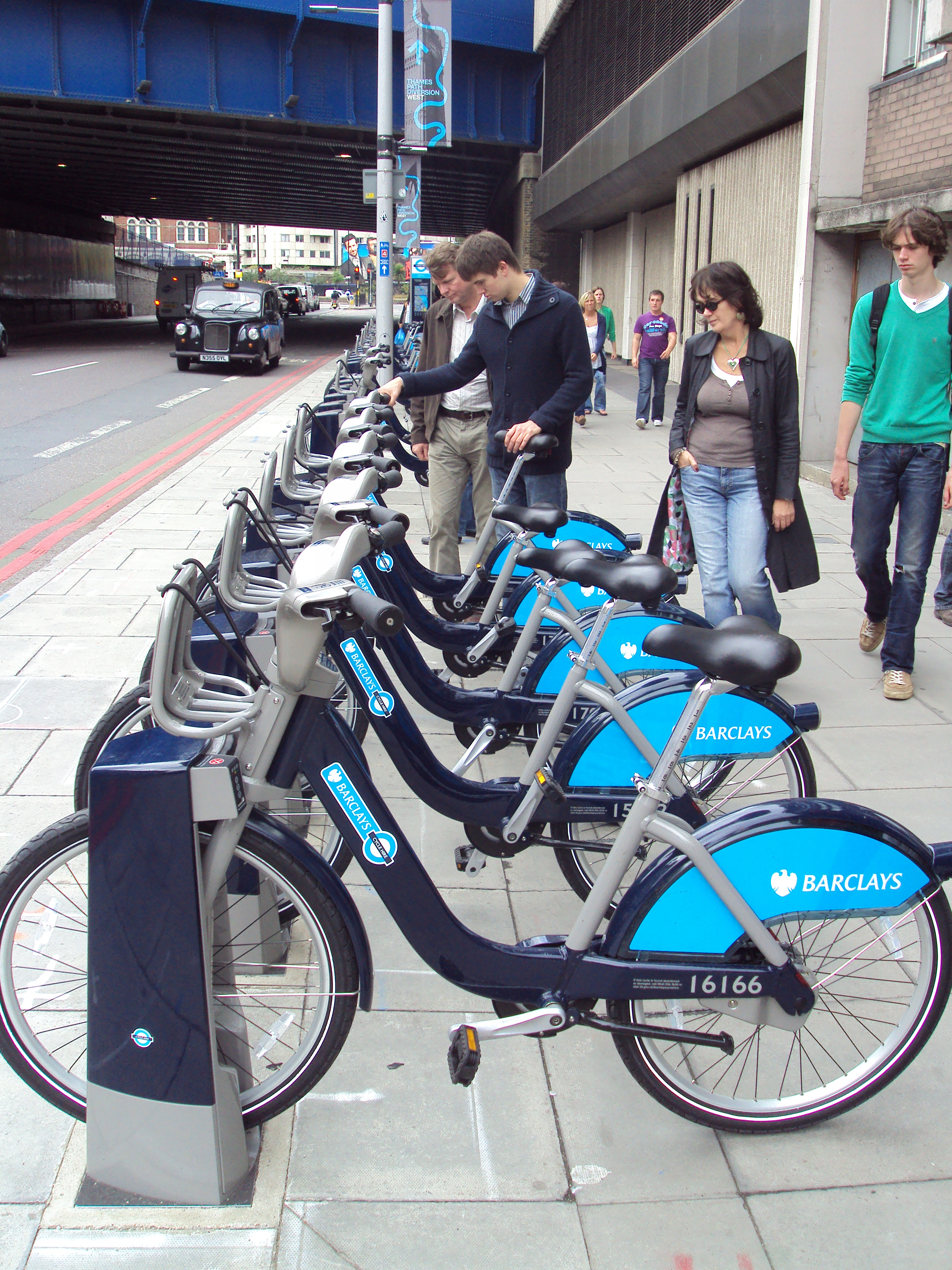
Barclays Cycle Hire docking station in Southwark Street

In 2000, Livingstone became the first elected Mayor of London, and in 2008 set a target of a 400% increase in cycling between 2008 and 2025. On 9 February 2008 Livingstone announced an estimated £400 million of initiatives to improve and increase cycling and walking, including thousands of new bike parking facilities at railway and tube stations. To be co-ordinated by the TfL and London boroughs, the aims include having one in ten Londoners making a round trip by bike each day and five per cent of all daily trips by bike by 2025.

In 2011 around 2.5 per cent of all commutes to work in London were by bike, though the figure was as high as 9% in Hackney. This compared to other cities in the United Kingdom such as Cardiff (4.3 per cent), York (18 per cent) and Cambridge (28 per cent of commutes) and to cities in mainland Europe such as Berlin (13 per cent), Munich (15 per cent), and Amsterdam (37 per cent of all journeys). The amount of growth has varied between regions within the city; on some routes such as Cheapside cyclists have been reported to comprise over half of rush-hour traffic.

Plans to construct twelve "Cycle Superhighway" routes were announced by Livingstone in 2008, connecting inner and outer London, as well as providing cycle zones around urban centres. Livingstone lost the subsequent mayoral election to Conservative Boris Johnson in May 2008, and the new mayor promised to continue to support cycling.

In July 2010, two pilot routes were implemented with Cycle Superhighway 3 (CS3) connecting Barking in East London with Tower Hill on the eastern perimeter of The City of London and Cycle Superhighway 7 (CS7) linking Colliers Wood in South London to Bank in the city. CS7 was criticised by rival cycling commentators and campaigners for relying on "blue paint" and bus lanes to protect cyclists from motor traffic, without using kerbed cycle tracks. CS3 was more popular, although critics argued that much of it had existed already, and had simply been rebranded as a Superhighway. Campaigners argued that the Mayor's rhetoric prior to launch had promised a much higher standard of cycling facility, yet the Superhighways encouraged cyclists on to busy main roads in conflict with buses and other motor traffic, with significant risk of being hit by left-turning vehicles at major junctions.

In July 2010, 6,000 bicycles became available for short-term rental from TfL under the Barclays Cycle Hire at 400 docking stations in nine central London boroughs. This was later expanded to 8,000 cycles from 570 stations, and is now branded Santander Cycles. The scheme, run by Montreal-based PBSC Urban Solutions, initially covered about 17 square miles (44 square kilometres). The docking stations were spaced 300 m (980 ft) apart, and sited mainly at key destinations and tube stations. There is a charge for hire, although there was an initial period of free use to promote the scheme. The scheme was designed based on a feasibility study produced by German Dector-Vega and Charles Snead in November 2008.

Over the next few years, pressure from campaign groups, bloggers and everyday cyclists using social media and on-street demonstrations brought the state of London's roads for cycling to the attention of the media. Eventually, this led to significant new investment in safer cycle infrastructure for London. In March 2013, City Hall announced £1 billion of improvements to make cycling safer and easier in London, as well as to improve air pollution and inner city congestion in the capital. Boris Johnson, Livingstone's replacement as Mayor of London, planned to build a 15-mile "Crossrail for bikes" running from the West London suburbs across the Westway, through Hyde Park, the Mall and along the Victoria Embankment past Canary Wharf and into East London.

In March 2013 "The Mayor's Vision for Cycling in London" was announced, a plan which includes a "Crossrail for bikes" running a fully segregated route from east to west across London to be in place by 2016. The statement also announced a Central London "bike grid" which would join up and improve existing cycle routes in Zone 1, as well as a network of "Quietways" in outer London, and E-bikes for rent in hilly areas of the city. The London Cycle Hire Scheme has been described by the deputy mayor as "oozing" out over London with expansion in 2014 in Hackney, Notting Hill, Hammersmith, Fulham and Wandsworth.

In December 2013, TfL published a draft map of a "Central London Grid" of new cycle routes.

In February 2017 Kingston upon Thames London Borough Council agreed to set up a social prescribing trial as part of the Go Cycle campaign, in which GPs, physiotherapists and mental health professionals can refer patients for a free 12-week course with professional cycle coaches and qualified instructors.

The Obike dockless hire scheme launched in London in July 2017 followed by introduction of other e-bike schemes. As of 2026, the main e-bikes rental schemes are run by Lime and Forest, with Voi and Bolt having also recently begun operations. The schemes are licensed on a borough by borough basis and many outer boroughs have no licensed operators.

== Facilities ==
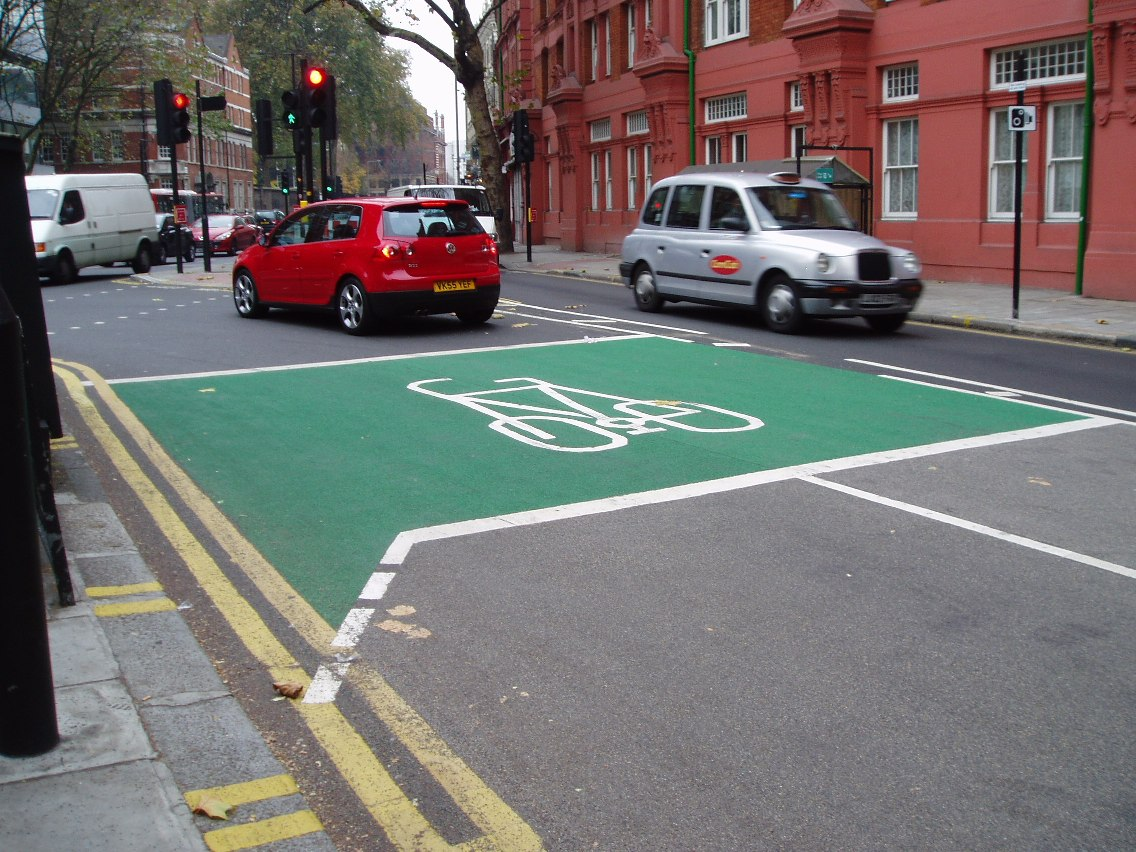
An advanced stop line allows cyclists to get a head start on stationary traffic.

=== Cycle lanes and paths ===
On-road cycle lanes vary. Some have raised concrete kerbs that separate people cycling from other traffic, whilst others are defined by lines painted on the road surface. The first Cycle Superhighways went into use in May 2010, and the first Quietways in 2016.

Cycle paths include routes through the royal parks (St. James's Park, Hyde Park, Regent's Park and Green Park), along the Thames Path and London's canals and waterways. There is a behavioural code for considerate riding on London's towpaths.

=== On public transport ===
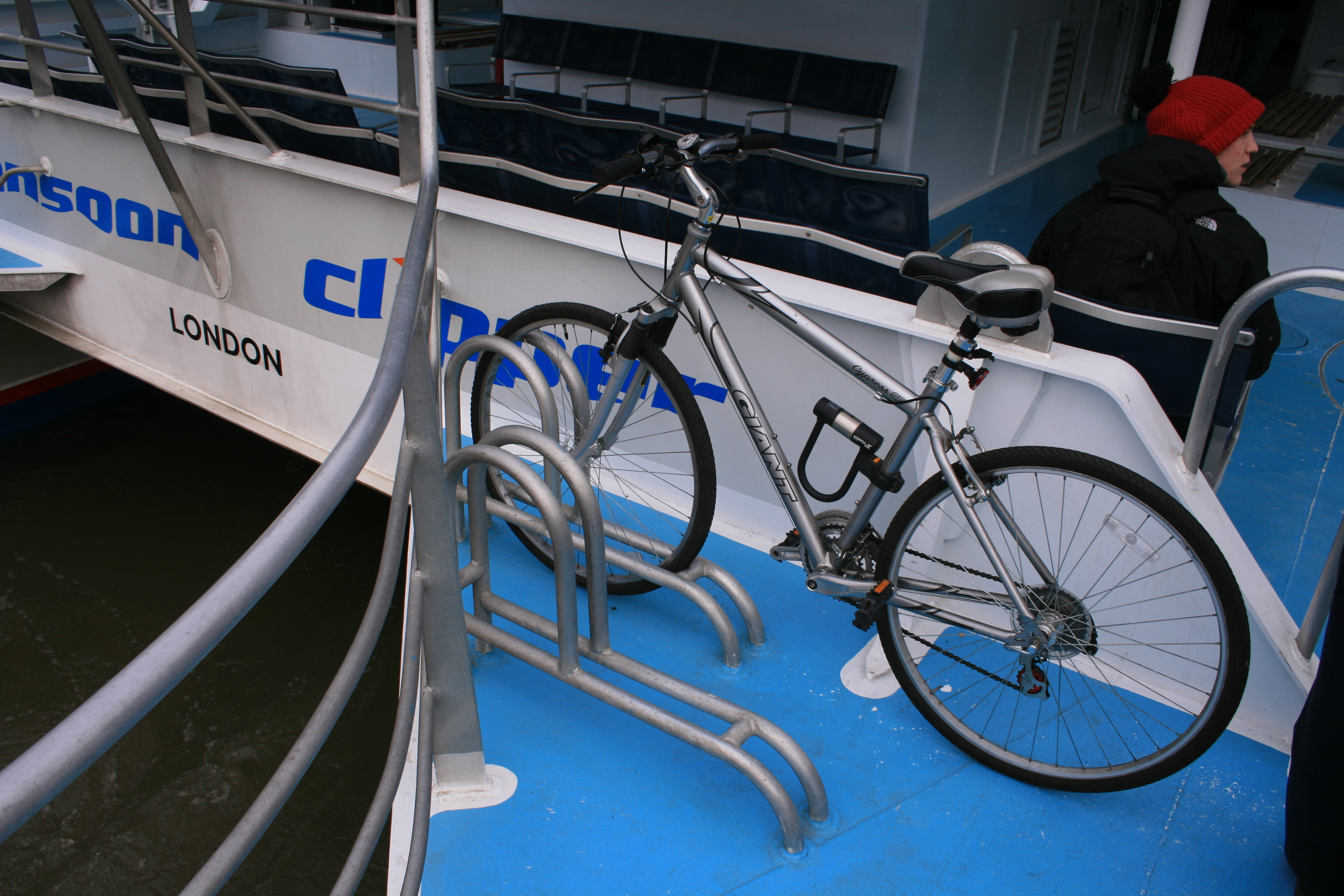
A bike rack on a Thames Clipper commuter catamaran on the River Thames.

Folding bicycles may be carried on almost all public transport in London. Full-size bicycles may be carried on some sections of the transport network during certain hours of the day. Bicycle parking facilities, generally cycle stands, but in some cases more secure facilities, are available at many stations.

When bicycles may be carried on London's public transport network
	Full-size bicycles	Folded bicycles
During morning (07:30-09:30) and evening (16:00-19:00) rush hours	Prohibited on: All London Underground (LU) lines; All Docklands Light Railway (DLR) lines; All Tramlink lines; All buses; Most National Rail (NR) lines (Note: See Transport for London's website for full details.); Most London Overground (LO) lines; Some of the Elizabeth line	Permitted on: All LU, NR and Tramlink lines; All river boat services; Buses, at driver's discretion
At other times	Permitted on: LU surface lines; All LO and NR lines; All DLR lines; The Elizabeth line; The London cable car; Most river boat services	Permitted on: All LU, NR and Tramlink lines; All river boat services; Buses, at driver's discretion
At other times	Prohibited on: Deep-level LU lines; All Tramlink lines; All buses	Permitted on: All LU, NR and Tramlink lines; All river boat services; Buses, at driver's discretion

== Safety ==
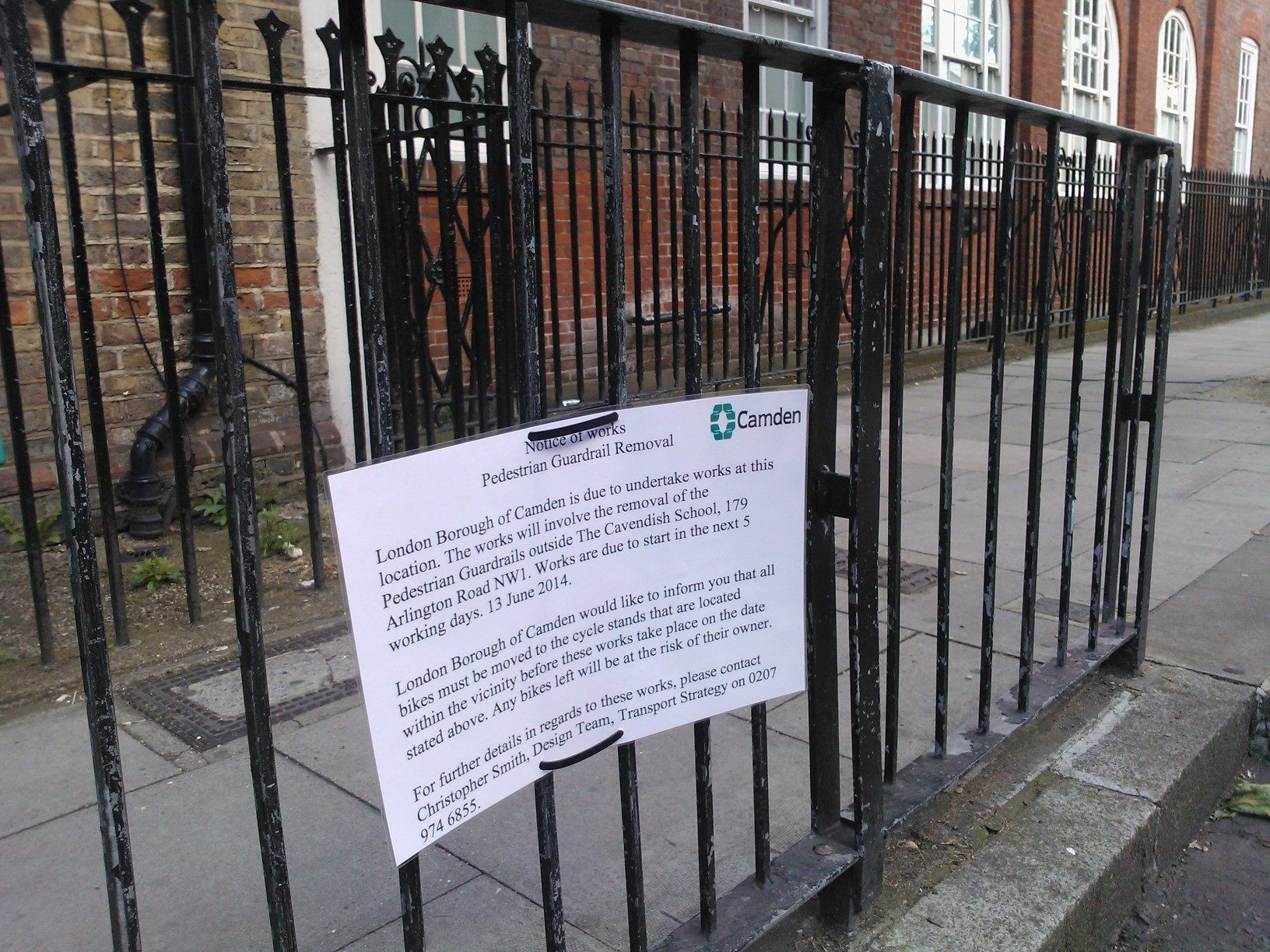
A segment of guardrail in Camden marked as being due for removal in June 2014

Many roads in London are lined with guardrail, and cyclist deaths have occurred when motor vehicles crushed people against the rail as they cycled. In 2007, TfL set a policy of the use of guardrail only in locations where it has been proven to be a requirement for safety, and began a programme of removing it where possible. By 2010, 60 kilometres (37 mi) of the 204 kilometres (127 mi) of guardrail on the Transport for London Road Network had been removed.

In 2008 Ken Livingstone announced that councils would be able to set borough-wide 20 miles per hour (32 km/h) limits without a requirement for special enforcement measures. Islington and Southwark subsequently imposed borough-wide 20 mph zones, with Camden announcing plans to introduce the same system in 2012. The City of London imposed a borough-wide 20 mph limit in July 2014. Such zones are backed by cycling groups, who support traffic speed restrictions for both encouraging walking and cycling, and making them safer.

In January 2013 Boris Johnson appointed London's first Cycling Commissioner, tasked with making it a safer and more popular mode of transport in the capital, and announced that segregated cycle facilities would be built across London as part of a package of measures designed to improve cyclist safety.

In June 2013 TfL announced the creation of a "Safe Streets for London" plan. The plan aims to cut road deaths by 40% by 2020 via a range of measures, including redesigning "critical" major junctions and streets, installing more and upgrading existing traffic enforcement cameras, working with London boroughs to implement more 20 mph speed limit zones, modifying heavy goods vehicles with safety equipment, and offering cycle training to every school pupil in London.

Later the same year, it was claimed that half of cyclists still routinely ignored red traffic lights at typical junctions in London, with the Licensed Taxi Drivers Association releasing two-hour-long rush hour videos that they said backed up drivers' daily experience that cyclists illegally using the pavement, running red lights or weaving in and out of vehicles, were not a small minority. The London Cycling Campaign said that police figures indicated far more of cyclists' accidents were caused by poor driving than by ignoring red lights, although a survey indicated that more than half of cyclists admitted ignoring a red light at least once.

The following year the London Cycling Campaign participated in a safety initiative with the Guide Dogs charity stressing that cyclists have a duty of care to be considerate to other road users, and pedestrians in particular, after the charity found that one in four blind and partially-sighted people in London had been hit by a cyclist, and seven in ten suffered a near miss, with cyclists commonly riding on pavements at speed or running red lights.

=== Statistics ===
The number of daily bicycle journeys in London has increased by 314% since the 1990s, from 270,000 daily journeys in 1993 to 1,118,000 in 2022. Jan-Aug 2023 has an average 1,172,000 daily journeys (5% increase on 2022 and 7% decrease on 2020), 3 fatalities and 626 seriously injured.

Journeys by bicycle, fatalities and serious injuries to cyclists (Note: Fatality and serious injury figures from Transport for London. Transport for London uses the Department for Transport's definition of "seriously injured", which is one or more of the following: broken neck or back; severe head injury, unconscious; severe chest injury, any difficulty breathing; internal injuries; multiple severe injuries, unconscious; loss of arm or leg (or part); other chest injury, not bruising; deep penetrating wound; fracture; deep cuts/lacerations; other head injury; crushing; burns (excluding friction burns); concussion; severe general shock requiring hospital treatment; detention in hospital as an in-patient, either immediately or later; injuries to casualties who die 30 or more days after the accident from injuries sustained in that accident.) in Greater London
Year	Average daily journeys (millions)	Average miles per person per year	Killed per year	Seriously injured per year
1993	0.270		18	485
1994	0.270		15	480
1995	0.270		15	521
1996	0.270		20	571
1997	0.270		12	560
1998	0.270		12	595
1999	0.270		10	469
2000	0.276		14	399
2001	0.307		21	434
2002	0.307		20	387
2003	0.328	35	19	414
2004	0.343	46	8	332
2005	0.406	50	21	351
2006	0.445	54	19	373
2007	0.444	51	15	446
2008	0.466	53	15	430
2009	0.468	61	13	420
2010	0.492	58	10	457
2011	0.491	58	16	555
2012	0.501	61	14	657
2013	0.504	61	14	475
2014	0.561	71	13	419
2015	1.015	79	9	378
2016	0.979	65	8	682
2017	1.012	62	10	675
2018	1.012	68	12	770
2019	0.986	65	5	773
2020	1.258	136	6	862
2021	0.865	108	10	989
2022	1.118	104	7	1,020

A study of deaths of cyclists in London published in 2010 in the research journal BMC Public Health stated that "the biggest threat [to cyclists] remains freight vehicles, involved in more than 4 out of 10 incidents, with over half turning left at the time of the crash."

=== 2013 deaths ===
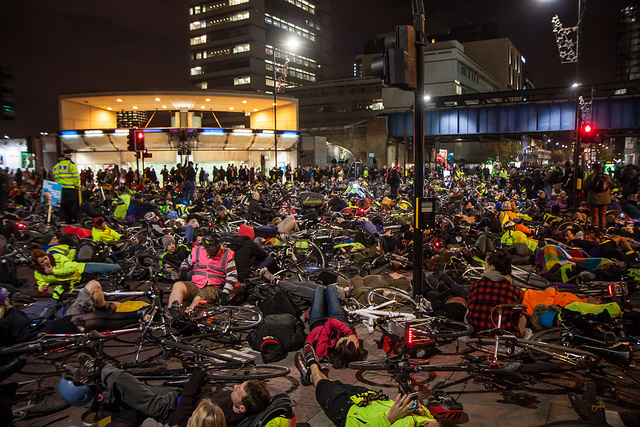
Over 1,000 cyclists participated in a 2013 die-in protest outside TfL's headquarters after six cyclists died in a fortnight.

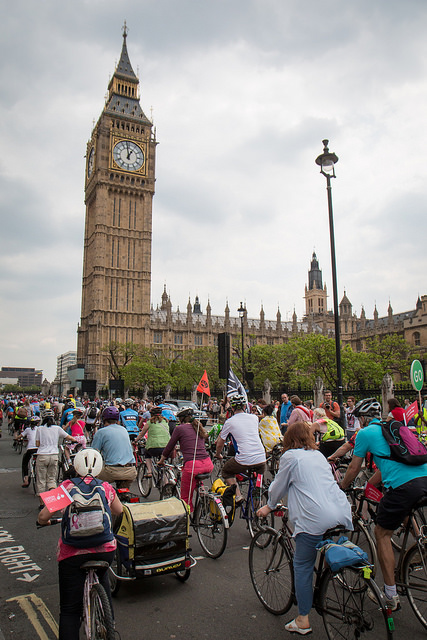
The Space for Cycling campaign's Big Ride approaching the Houses of Parliament.

In November 2013, six cyclists were killed on London streets within a two-week period, bringing the number of cyclists killed in London in the year to 14, nine of which involved a heavy goods vehicle (HGV). In response, the Metropolitan Police announced an initiative called Operation Safeway, in which 2,500 traffic police were stationed at major junctions throughout the city to issue fixed penalty notices to road users breaking road traffic laws and offer advice to vulnerable road users. Following the deaths, Boris Johnson stated in an interview on BBC Radio that cyclists were endangering their lives when not following road traffic laws, making it "very difficult for the traffic engineers to second-guess [their actions]". The comments were immediately condemned as "deflecting blame onto cyclists [and] grossly insensitive" by Roger Geffen, campaigns and policy director of the Cyclists' Touring Club, and as "dodging responsibility" and "an insult to the dead and injured" by Darren Johnson, the Green Party member of the London Assembly. Former Olympic cyclist Chris Boardman, policy director for British Cycling, the national governing body for cycle racing in Great Britain, called on Johnson to ban HGVs from some London roads during peak hours, saying that Johnson had made a verbal promise to him "to look at the successful experiences of Paris and many other cities in restricting the movements of heavy vehicles during peak hours". Johnson stated in a radio interview that he was unconvinced by the idea, but was however considering banning cyclists from wearing headphones while riding. However, the traffic division of the Metropolitan Police were unable to identify any serious cycling incidents in which headphone use could be identified as a contributing factor.

Two weeks after the sixth death, a protest campaign organised via social media held a die-in—modelled on the Dutch "Stop de Kindermoord" pro-cycling demonstrations of the 1970s—outside the headquarters of TfL, in which over 1,000 cyclists lay silently in the road and held a vigil for cyclists and pedestrians killed by road traffic.

A BBC poll taken in December 2013 found that one fifth of regular cycle commuters had stopped cycling to work as a result of the recent spate of deaths. A fifth of the survey respondents had also been involved in a collision, and 68% believed that London's roads were not safe to cycle on.

== Regular events ==
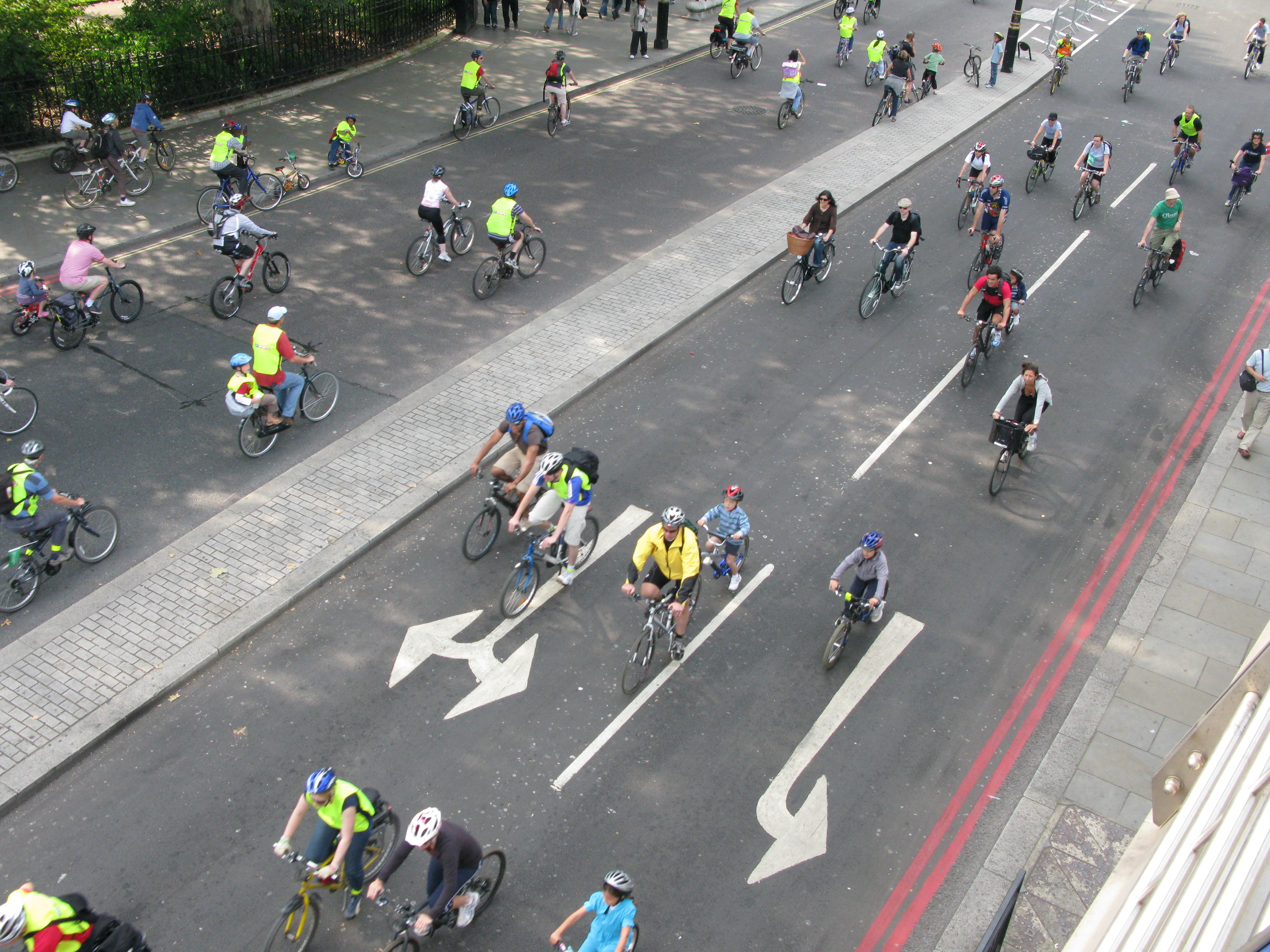
London Freewheel 2008

- RideLondon (formally Mayor of London's Sky Ride): an annual event launched as London Freewheel in September 2007, for which certain roads in central London are closed to motor vehicles for several hours on a Sunday. On 10 August 2012 it was announced that the 2013 Skyride would be re-branded as 'RideLondon', a two-day 'World-class festival of cycling'. The event incorporates an 8-mile 'FreeCycle' event, 'Aimed at cyclists of all ages and abilities' on closed roads, as well as a 100-mile ride and a 'Grand Prix' event for professional cyclists.
- Critical Mass, which leaves the National Film Theatre on the South Bank around 7.00pm on the last Friday of each month

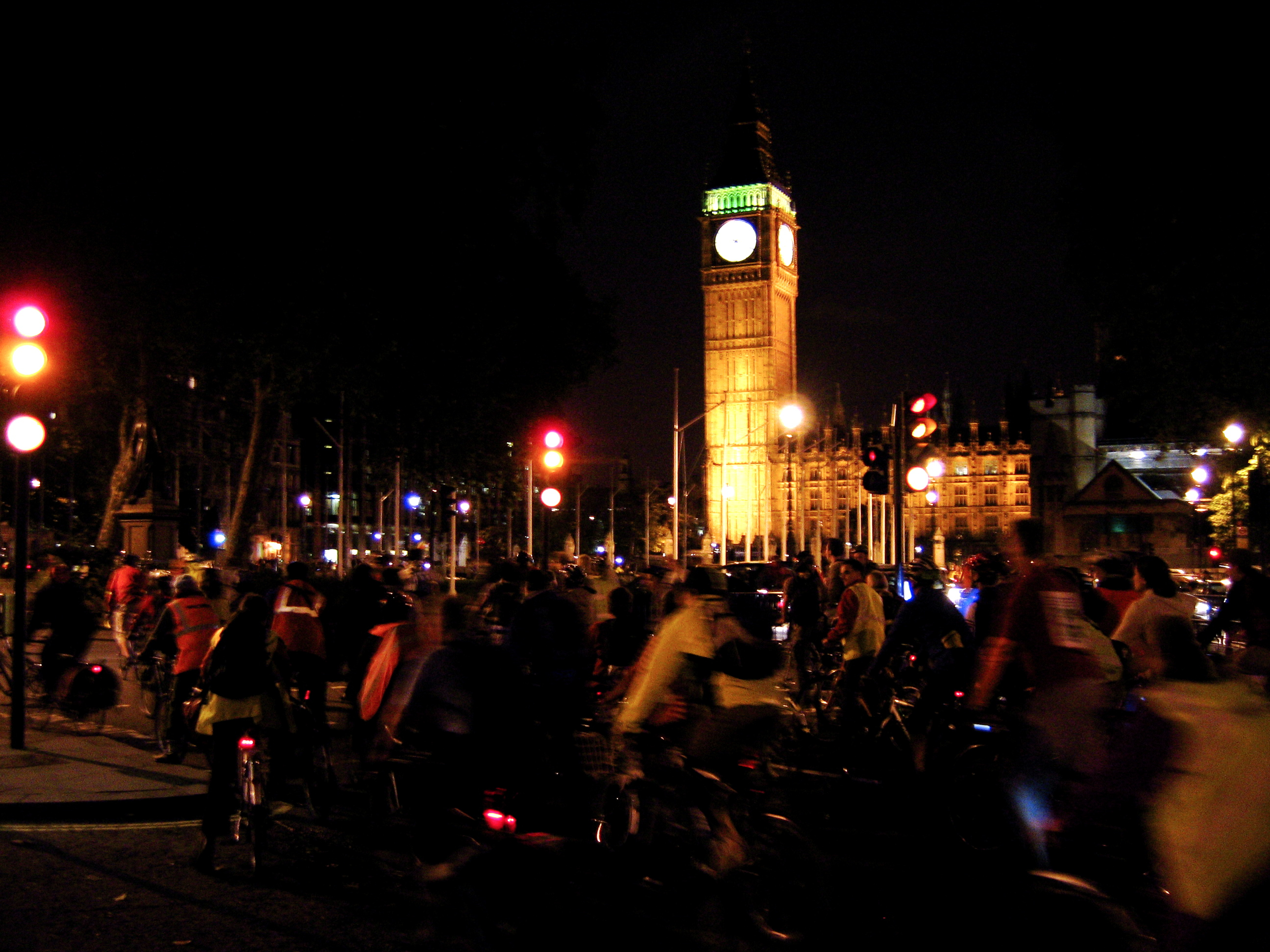
A critical mass event in 2005

- World Naked Bike Ride, held annually in 70 cities in 20 countries, including London every June since 2004,
- Bike Week, an annual UK celebration of cycling with many local events in June
- London to Brighton ride for charity each summer; about 30,000 cyclists take part
- London to Paris rides for various charities
- Dunwich Dynamo, annual midsummer overnight ride to Suffolk since 1993
- London Cycling Awards: the London Cycling Campaign celebrates some of the best improvements for cyclists each year with the London Cycling Awards. 2008 winners included cycle parking at Frampton Park Estate in Hackney and at Shadwell DLR station; Kingston Council and Metropolitan Police for the Recycling Bikes Back into The Community scheme; Newham University Hospital NHS Trust for the Well at Work project; STA Bikes and Hackney Council for Family Cycle Clubs; and Jenny Jones for services to cycling.
- The Tweed Run, an annual ride inaugurated in 2009 where the participants recreate the early years of British cycling by wearing tweed and other period clothing and by riding vintage bicycles.

== Citations ==
=== News ===
- D.K (16 December 2013). "The Economist explains: Why does cycling thrive in some cities and not in others?". The Economist.
- "How London bloggers changed cycling". BBC News. BBC. 6 March 2013a.
- "London cyclists: Fifth of riders 'stop bike-commuting'". BBC News. 2 December 2013b.
- "London cycle network map published". BBC News. 20 December 2013.
- "London cyclist deaths: Officers at dangerous junctions". BBC News. 25 November 2013d.
- "Camden joins Islington and Southwark to cut road speed limits to 20mph". Evening Standard. 6 December 2012.
- "London cycle deaths: Chris Boardman wants HGV ban". BBC News. 21 November 2013e.
- Hamer, Mick (11 June 1981). "London's cyclists get a £2 million better deal". New Scientist. Vol. 90, no. 1257. p. 676. ISSN 0262-4079.
- Jones, Sam; Walker, Peter; Wintour, Patrick (14 November 2013). "Boris Johnson accused of dodging responsibility over cycling deaths". The Guardian.
- Keeley, Amie (25 July 2013). "Council give green light for Camden to become 20mph zone". Ham & High.
- Lydall, Ross (7 March 2013). "Truly a cycling revolution: Boris Johnson reveals his 15-mile segregated bike lanes from east to west across the heart of London". Evening Standard.
- Neather, Andrew (30 June 2011). "London's bike boom". Evening Standard.
- Quigley-Jones, Jennifer (13 November 2009). "On yer bikes". The Economist. The World in 2010.
- Stuttle, John (1 December 2013). "Over 1,000 cyclists stage die-in protest outside Transport for London HQ". The Guardian.
- Taylor, Matthew (9 February 2008). "City's two-wheel transformation". The Guardian. London.
- Usborne, Simon (8 March 2013). "Crossrail for bikes: Boris unveils fully-segregated cycle lanes in billion-pound plan to revolutionise cycling in London". The Independent.
- Walker, Peter (19 November 2013). "Boris Johnson's credibility with London cyclists is slipping away". The Guardian.
- Williams, David; Lydall, Ross (22 January 2008). "20mph limit for London". Evening Standard. Archived from the original on 6 June 2011.

=== Reports and data ===
- "Barclays Cycle Hire: Frequently requested statistics" (PDF). Transport for London. December 2013.
- London Road Safety Unit (October 2010). "Collisions and casualties on London's roads 2009" (PDF). Transport for London. p. 116.
- Morgan, Andrei; Dale, Helen B.; Lee, William E.; Edwards, Phil J. (15 November 2010). "Deaths of cyclists in London: trends from 1992 to 2006". BMC Public Health. 10: 699. doi:10.1186/1471-2458-10-699. PMC 2992064. PMID 21078190.
- "Guardrail Removal Programme" (PDF). Transport for London. 24 February 2009.
- "How many people ride bikes in Cambridge?". Cambridge Cycling Campaign. 2013.
- "Local area walking and cycling statistics: England 2011/12" (PDF). Sport England. 16 April 2013.
- "Mayor's Transport Strategy - Cycling". Transport for London. 16 June 2008. Archived from the original on 23 December 2009.
- Transport for London (15 July 2014). "Number of daily cycle journeys in London". WhatDoTheyKnow.
- Zheng, P.; Hall, R. D. (October 2003). "Pedestrian Guard Railing: A Review of Criteria for Installation" (PDF). Transport for London. University of Southampton. p. 1.
- "STATS 20: Instructions for the Completion of Road Accident Reports from non-CRASH Sources" (PDF). Department for Transport. September 2011. p. 72.
- Transport for London (2009). Travel in London, Report 1 (PDF) (Report). p. 21.
- Transport for London (2013). Travel in London, Report 6 (PDF) (Report). p. 16.
- "Update on the Guardrail Risk Assessment Form" (PDF). Transport for London. 12 July 2011. p. 2.

=== Announcements ===
- "City's 20mph speed limit passes final hurdle". Transport for London. 8 April 2014. Archived from the original on 1 July 2014.
- "Mayor Appoints Andrew Gilligan as Cycling Commissioner". Greater London Authority. 25 January 2013.
- "Mayor announces world class RideLondon event to take forward capital's Olympic legacy". Greater London Authority. 10 August 2012.
- "Safe Streets for London: The Road Safety Action Plan for London 2020" (PDF). Transport for London. June 2013.

=== Other ===
- "Barclays Cycle Superhighways". Transport for London.
- "Bike Week 2009", London Cycling Campaign, 19 December 2008
- "Bikes on public transport". Transport for London. 2014.
- "Cycles on public transport". Transport for London. 2022.
- Colville-Andersen, Mikael (21 July 2009). "Bicycle Culture by Design: The World's Most Bicycle Friendly Cities". Copenhagenize.;
- "Charity rides & events". London Cycling Campaign. 20 November 2008.
- "Cycle parking". Transport for London.
- Davies, J.R. (Writer, Producer, Director) (1984). Cycling for London (Television production). London: Greater London Council. Event occurs at 1:52.
- "GO 20 Campaign Briefing" (PDF). Brake. October 2012.
- "Mayor's New Vision for Cycling is Groundbreaking". London Cycling Campaign. Lcc.org.uk. 6 December 2012.
- "London Cycling Award Winners 2008". London Cycling Campaign. 10 November 2008.
- "London - World Naked Bike Ride (WNBR) - Wiki information site". Wiki.worldnakedbikeride.org. 29 March 2013.
- "Share the Space, Drop your Pace". Canal & River Trust. 2014.
