= Santander Cycles =

Public bicycle hire scheme in London

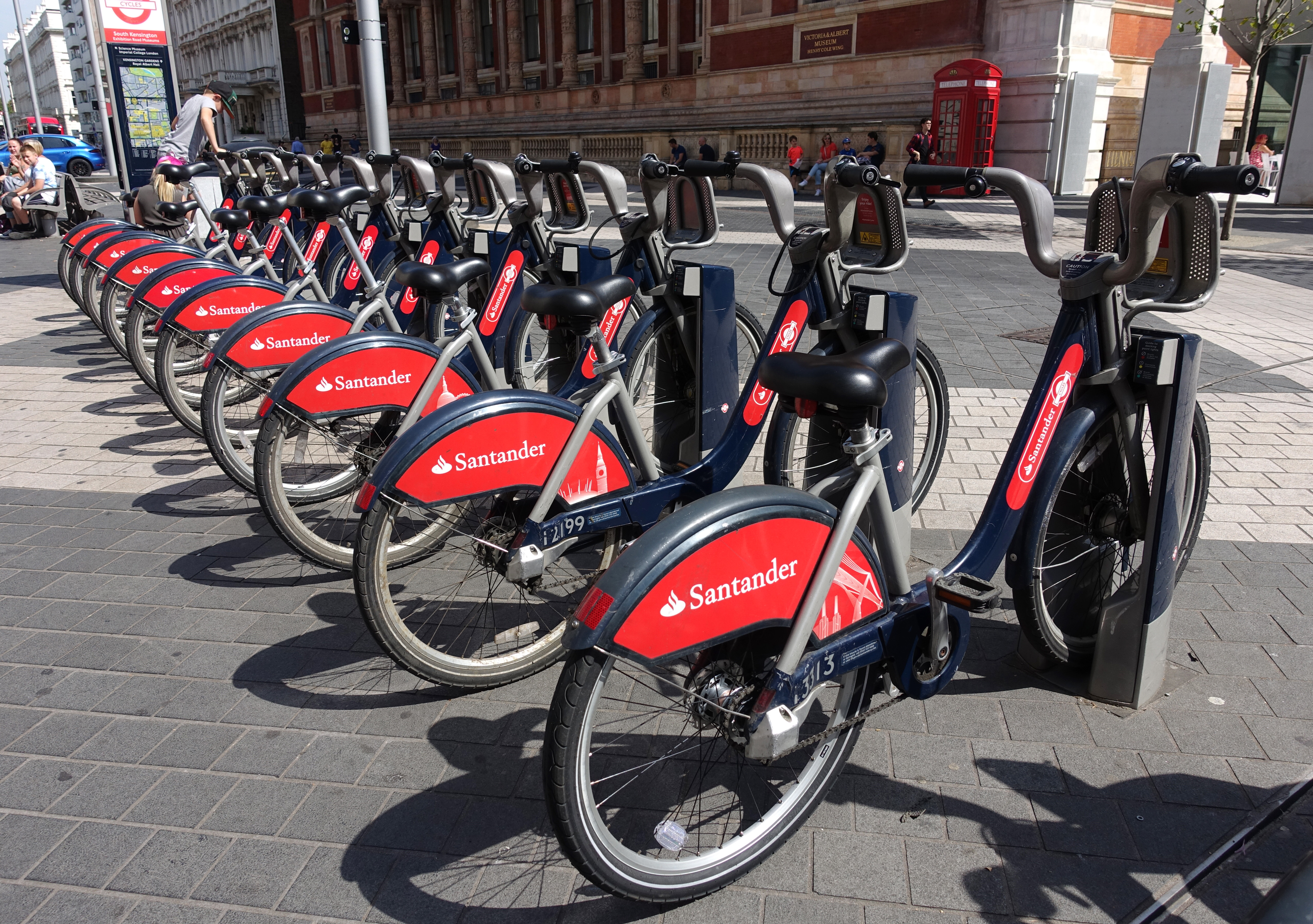

Overview
- Owner: Transport for London
- Locale: London, United Kingdom
- Transit type: Bicycle-sharing system
- Number of stations: 800
- Annual ridership: ▲9,066,554 (2025)
- Website: tfl.gov.uk/modes/cycling/santander-cycles

Operation
- Began operation: 30 July 2010; 16 years ago
- Operator: Serco
- Number of vehicles: 12,000 bicycles

Santander Cycles (formerly Barclays Cycle Hire) is a public bicycle hire scheme in London in the United Kingdom. The scheme's bicycles have been popularly known as Boris Bikes, after Boris Johnson who was Mayor of London when the scheme began operating. The network covers partially or fully 11 of the 32 London boroughs plus the City of London, extending outwards from the city centre.

The operation of the scheme was initially contracted by Transport for London (TfL) to Serco. Bikes and docking stations are provided by 8D Technologies. The scheme is sponsored, with Santander UK being the title sponsor from April 2015. The contract between Serco and TfL has been extended until 2031, with planned scheme upgrades and a new mobile app. Barclays was the first sponsor, from 2010 to March 2015.

Credit for developing and enacting the scheme has been a source of debate. Johnson has taken credit for the plan, although the initial concept was announced by his predecessor Ken Livingstone, during the latter's term in office. Livingstone said that the programme would herald a "cycling and walking transformation in London", and Johnson said that he "hoped the bikes would become as common as black cabs and red buses in the capital".

A study showed cyclists using the scheme are three times less likely to be injured per trip than cyclists in London as a whole, possibly due to motorists giving cycle hire users more road space than they do other cyclists, although trips by hire bike users seemed to be much shorter on average. Customer research in 2013 showed that 49 percent of Cycle Hire members say that the scheme has prompted them to start cycling in London.

As of October 2024, more than 136 million journeys had been made using the cycles, with the record for cycle hires in a single day being 73,000 in July 2015.

== History ==
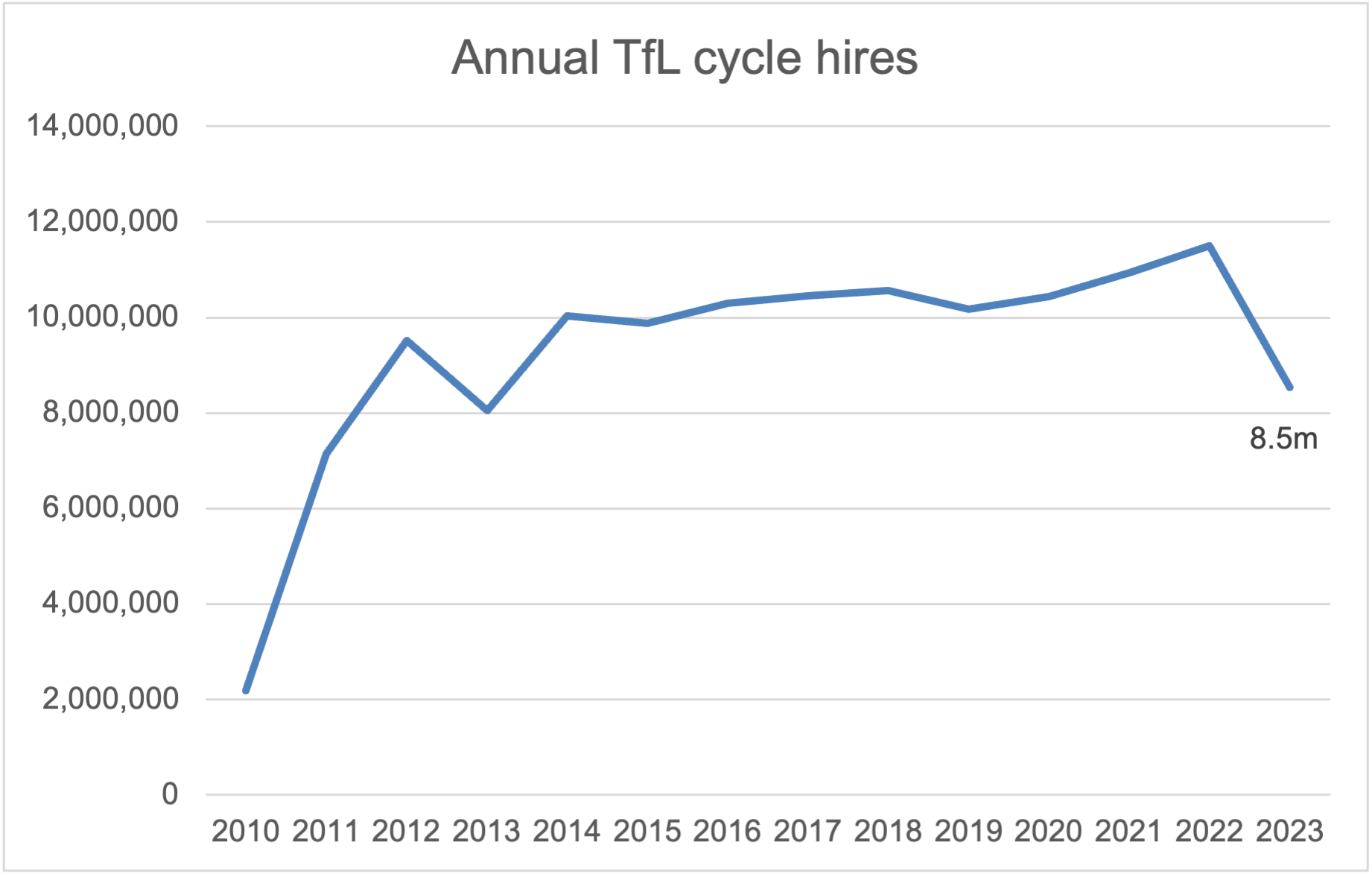
Number of hires of Santander bikes from 2010 to 2023

In August 2007, the Mayor of London, Ken Livingstone, announced that he was planning to implement a cycle-hire scheme modelled on the successful Vélib' network in Paris. Following discussions with the Mayor of Paris, Livingstone instructed transport officials to study the Paris and similar schemes, and draw up proposals for London. Discussions were conducted between Transport for London (TfL), the London boroughs and transport commissioners from Lyon, Brussels, Vienna, Berlin, Munich, Oslo and Copenhagen.

In February 2008, plans for the London cycle-hire scheme were officially unveiled by Livingstone. The CTC and Green Party hailed the proposals as revolutionary.

The scheme commenced operations as Barclays Cycle Hire on 30 July 2010, with 5,000 bicycles and 315 docking stations distributed across the City of London area and parts of eight London boroughs. The scheme was at first located mainly within the central zone, roughly bounded by the Zone 1 area of the TfL zoning system. The initial target was for it to comprise 400 docking stations when complete, at roughly 300-metre (330 yd) intervals. The initial planning and implementation costs were expected to total more than £140 million over the first six years of the project, exclusive of operating costs.

The scheme's bicycles have been popularly known as Boris Bikes, after Boris Johnson who was Mayor of London when the scheme began operating.

Initially, the scheme required initial payment of registration and membership fees to be paid in exchange for an electronic access key, but on 3 December 2010 this was changed to allow casual cycle hires by non-members who have a valid credit or debit card.

The project was expected to cost £140 million for planning and implementation over six years, potentially the only TfL system to fully fund its annual cost of operation, a goal originally estimated to take two to three years. The cost including installing the docking stations at around £200,000 each.

Between December 2010 and the end of May 2013, the scheme had registered 22 million rides without a death. The first fatality of a user of the scheme occurred in July 2013. A 20-year-old woman, Philippine De Gerin-Ricard, was killed outside Aldgate East station after being struck by a lorry, prompting a protest ride calling for improved separation between cycle routes and other traffic.

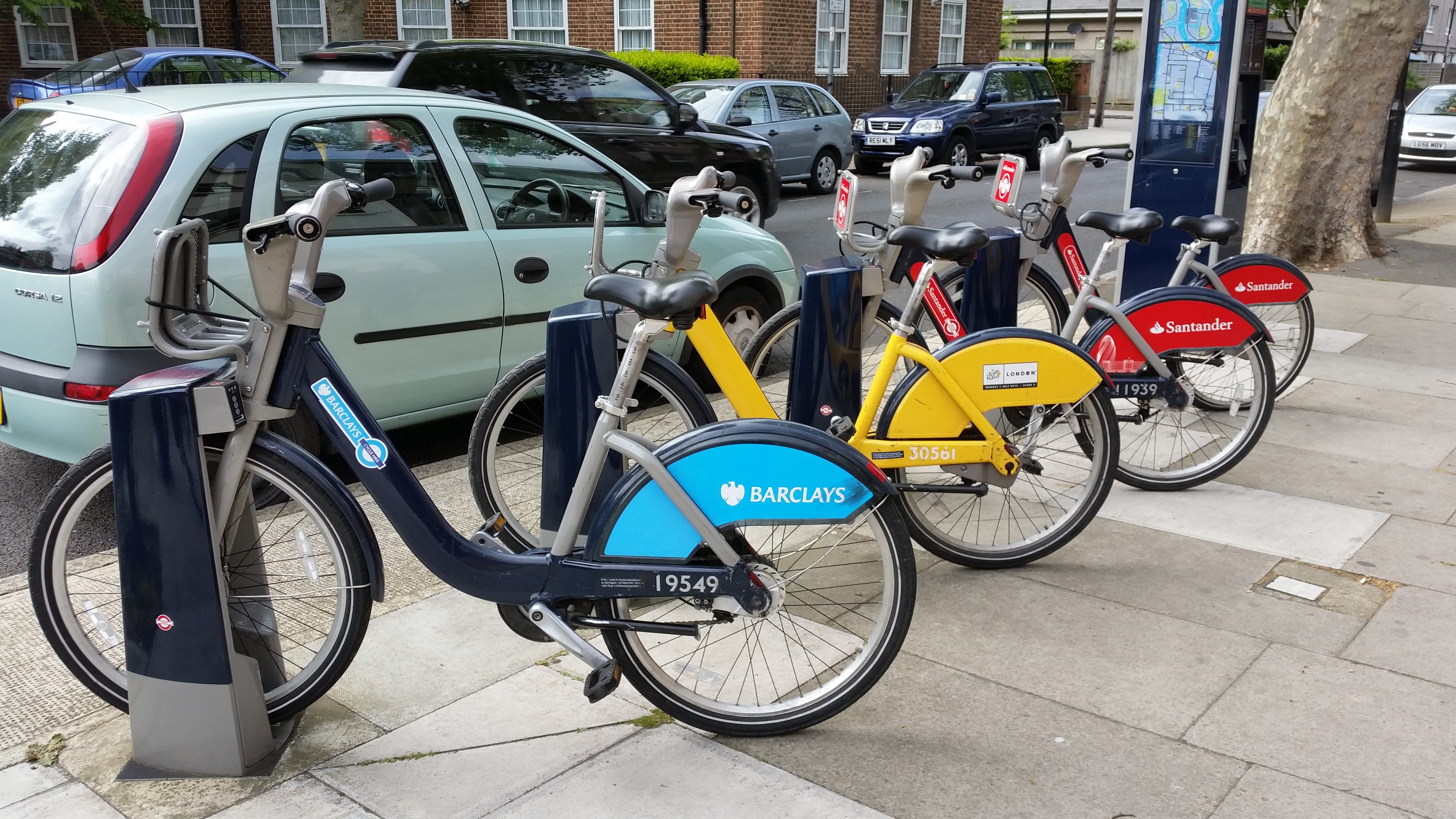
Blue (Barclays Cycle Hire), yellow (2014 Tour de France) and red (Santander Cycles) cycles in a docking station

Owing to the success of the scheme, major expansions have taken place to increase the number of bikes and docking stations across London.

The first major expansion was in March 2012, with a significant expansion in east London in Tower Hamlets and Hackney, with a minor expansion westwards to the new Westfield London shopping centre in Shepherds Bush. This expansion added 2,300 additional bikes and 4,800 docking points. In December 2013, the scheme received a further significant expansion ('Phase 3') in west and south west London. This expansion added approximately 2,000 more bikes and 150 new docking points, with new stations in the boroughs of Wandsworth, Hammersmith & Fulham, Lambeth and Kensington & Chelsea.

In 2015, sponsorship of the scheme transferred from Barclays to Santander, with the branding of the scheme becoming Santander Cycles. According to TfL, the £43.75 million sponsorship deal over seven years is the largest public sector sponsorship in the world. Santander's sponsorship was extended in May 2021 for a further three years until April 2025.

The scheme has continued to expand in recent years, to the Queen Elizabeth Olympic Park in January 2016, and Brixton in February 2018. The scheme now spreads across 100 km^{2} (39 sq mi) of London with more than 12,000 bikes and 800 stations. Vélib', the public bicycle hire scheme in Paris, is much larger with 20,000 bikes and 1,400 stations spread across 450 km^{2} (170 sq mi).

In October 2022, TfL expanded the cycle scheme with the addition of 500 new docked e-bikes.

In July 2025 the Side Quests initiative was launched by Santander Cycles. It is a collection of cycling routes in lesser-visited areas of London, intended to encourage people to visit them by bike and explore their cultural interest. A Google Maps route is provided for each.

== Operation ==
Regular users of the scheme can register on the TfL website for a Single Ride (pay by journey), Day Pass, Monthly or Annual membership (recurring subscription). Registered users can undock the bike using an app, or can buy a key (£3) to operate the docking stations (up to four keys can be registered under a single account). The key allows a cycle to be released from the docking station. Unregistered users can purchase a Single Ride or a Day Pass at any docking station by using their payment card.

On 3 December 2010, the scheme was extended to casual users who are not members of the scheme but hold major payment cards. The cost is the same to members and casual users, except that casual use for one year is not available. A credit or debit card can be used in a docking station to release a bicycle.

Usage charges are charged at £1.65 per every 30 minutes or part thereof, registered members that have a subscription can have unlimited rides of up to 60 minutes during their subscription period, then £1.65 per additional 30 minutes or part thereof.

Since 2022, electrically assisted bikes (e-bikes) have also been available. These are only available to registered users (unlocked via the app or a key), for £3.30 per journey up to 30 minutes (subscribers pay a £1 supplement per journey up to 60 minutes). All users pay £3.30 per additional 30 minutes.

From March 2024, both casual and registered users of the scheme can purchase a Day Pass for £3.50, allowing unlimited 60-minute journeys within a 24 hour period (was £3.00 for 30 minutes but tariffs were upgraded by TfL in April 2025). Like other memberships, rides longer than 60 minutes incur an additional £1.65 per extra 60 minutes, with e-bikes costing £1 extra per journey and £3 for each additional 60 minutes.

== Cycles ==
=== Devinci ===
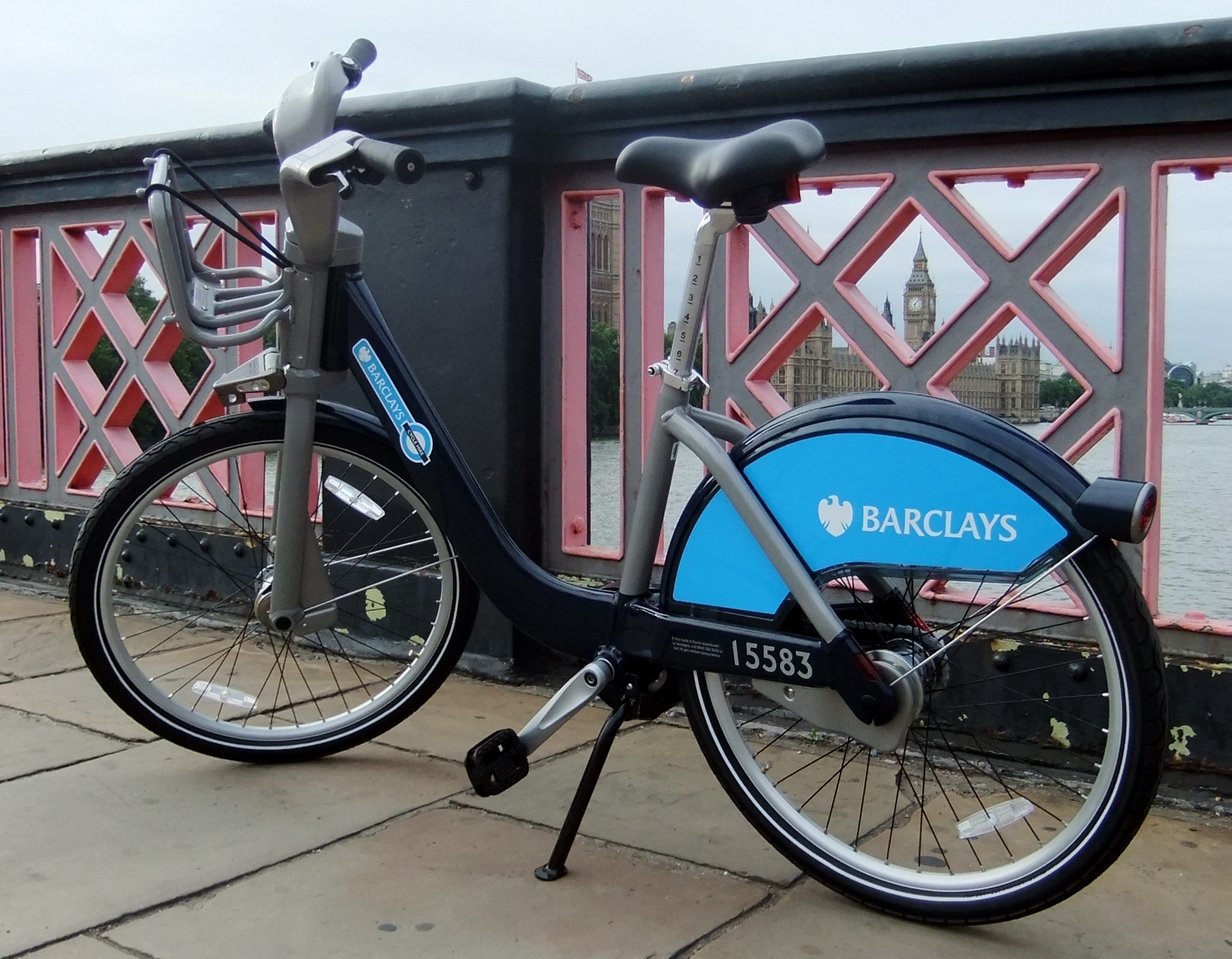
Cycle on Lambeth Bridge

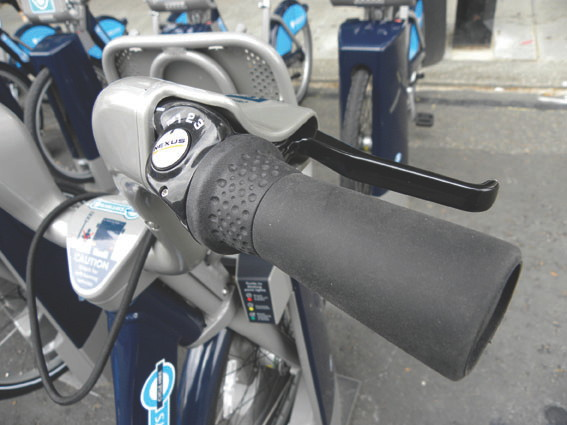
Hire bike handlebar

The original bicycles were built by Cycles Devinci to the following specification:

- Puncture-resistant tyres to increase durability.
- Drum brakes on both wheels, controlled by right-front, left-rear brake levers on handlebar.
- Three-speed hub gear operated by a twist grip on right handlebar.
- Bell on left handlebar.
- Chain guard.
- Gear linkage guard.
- Dynamo-powered front and rear LED lights (for visibility to other traffic, not road illumination) which flash when the bicycle is being ridden and for at least two minutes after it has stopped.
- Small luggage rack in front of handlebar, open at the sides, with elastic shock cord to secure possessions.
- Kickstand.
- Reflective numbers affixed on both sides of frame by rear wheel axle, uniquely identifying each bike.

The bicycles are utility bicycles with a step-through frame. The cycles are not provided with locks (unlike the Vélib' scheme in Paris).

The one-piece aluminium frame and handlebars conceal cables and fasteners in an effort to protect them from vandalism, damage and inclement weather. The heavy-duty tyres are designed to be puncture-resistant and are filled with nitrogen to maintain proper inflation pressure longer. A row of five LEDs on front of the luggage rack and twin LED rear lights are integrated into the robust frame, which weighs approximately 23 kg (51 lb).

The bikes were designed by industrial designer Michel Dallaire and built in the Saguenay, Quebec region by Cycles Devinci.

The cycles are low-geared to compensate for their weight and to provide a way of limiting their top speed. Using a Shimano Nexus three-hub gear with a 38-tooth chainring in front and a larger than standard 23 tooth rear sprocket the setting is 32 gear inches in first gear, 44 gear inches in second gear, and 60 gear inches in third gear. This gearing is about 22% lower than would be usual on a three-speed cycle of this sort.

The cycles and the docking stations are built in Canada by PBSC Urban Solutions and are based on the Bixi cycle rental system that operates in many cities including Montreal, Melbourne and Toluca.

In December 2015, it was decided to fit all the cycles with front laser lights. The laser projects a green cycle symbol approximately 6 m (20 ft) in front of the bike to warn drivers and effectively reduce blind angles.

=== Pashley ===
A new design made by Pashley Cycles was introduced in late 2017, with the following changes:

- Smaller frame
- Smaller wheels: 24 inches (610 mm)
- Shimano brakes
- Puncture-resistant tyres

=== 2022 e-bikes ===
New e-bikes were introduced in October 2022, with the following changes:

The bicycles have a battery-powered assist motor that operates up to a maximum speed 15.5 mph (24.9 km/h). When the battery charge falls to 20 per cent, maintenance staff receive an alert and the e-bikes cannot be released from their docking station until a fully charged replacement battery is installed.

== Coverage area and future expansion ==
The success of the scheme has led to its expansion into other areas of London. As of August 2018, the coverage area is roughly bounded by:

- North of the Thames: Hammersmith, Shepherd's Bush, the Westway, St John's Wood, Camden Town, Angel, Dalston, Victoria Park, Queen Elizabeth Olympic Park, Poplar and Isle of Dogs.
- South of the Thames: Putney, Wandsworth, Battersea, Clapham, Brixton, Stockwell, Kennington, Walworth and Bermondsey.

The following boroughs are partly or fully covered: Hammersmith and Fulham, Kensington and Chelsea, Westminster, Camden, Islington, the City, Hackney, Tower Hamlets, Newham, Southwark, Lambeth and Wandsworth.

But despite calls from other Londoners, the scheme has yet to expand into many areas close to central London, including central and north Islington. Coverage is noticeably poor in south-east London, an area that has a limited overall Tube network. Coverage is exceptionally poor in Outer London, where the scheme is almost non-existent. In some cases, planned expansion has been delayed by Londoners who support the London Cycle Hire Scheme in principle, but dislike the idea of having a docking station on their street, or losing car parking spaces to make room for docking stations.

Many Londoners are keen to see the system expand, with lobbying from Greenwich, Southwark, Hackney and Richmond, but funding is a challenge, owing to the high cost of the docking stations and the cost of the bikes. The London Boroughs and TfL work with developers of major developments to secure funding for future cycle hire stations.

== Docking stations ==
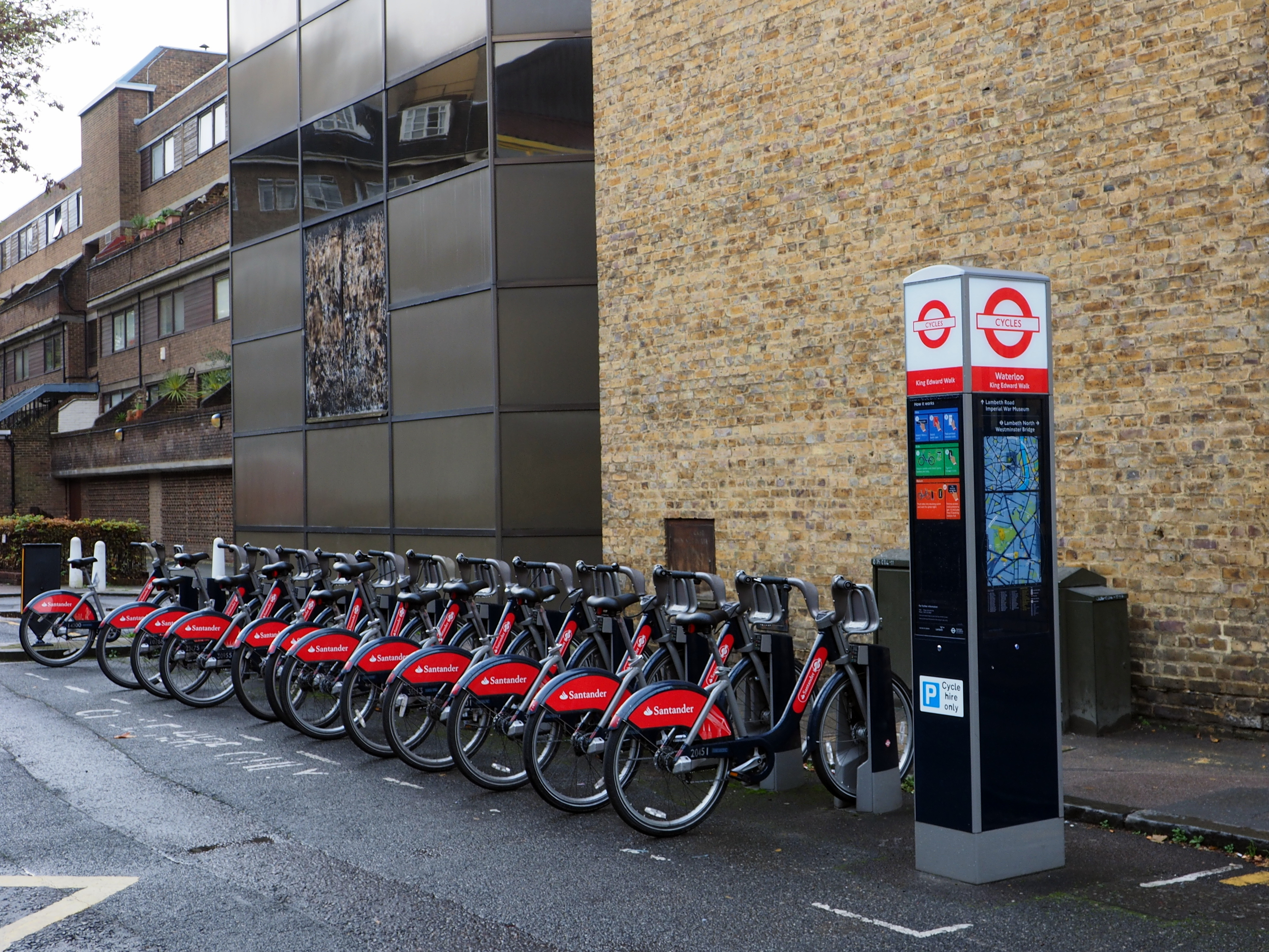
Docking station

Docking stations consist of a terminal and docking points where users pick up and return cycles. The terminal at each docking station contains a screen allowing users to:

- Hire a cycle with a chip and PIN payment card if the user does not have a key;
- Print a record of their journey;
- Find other nearby docking stations, necessary if one is full when returning or empty when seeking a cycle;
- Get extra time without charge to return the cycle to another docking station if one is full; and
- See a local street map, scheme costs, the code of conduct, and information in other languages.

If there is a fault with a cycle that was rented, it can be docked at the nearest station and the red 'fault' button on the docking point pressed within ten seconds; another bike can then be taken at no extra cost.

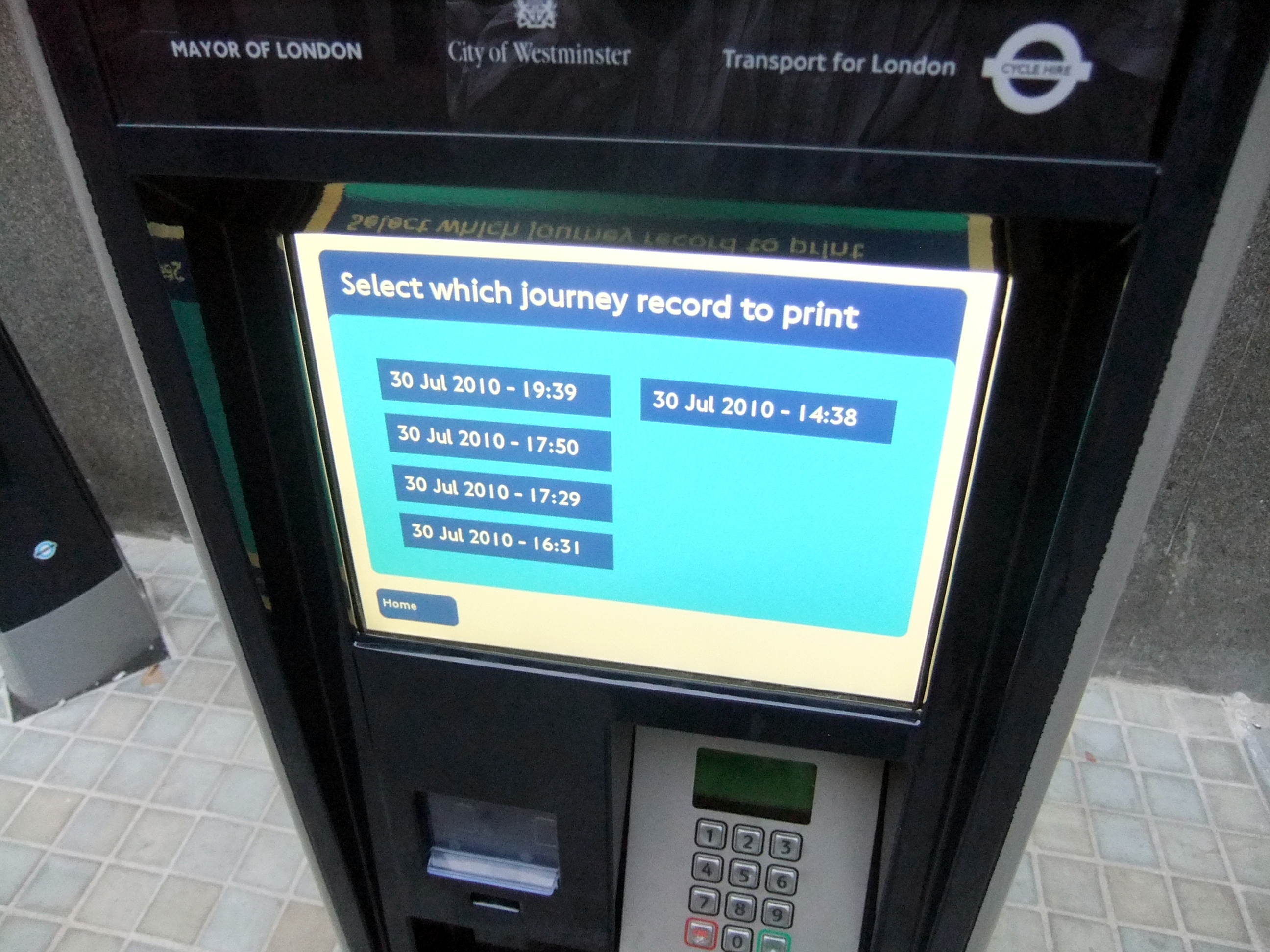
Terminal screen

During high load hours the bikes are moved from the busiest stations to the emptiest using trailers pulled by Alkè ATX280E electric vehicles with zero CO_{2} emissions, and Ford Transit vans with specially designed tail ramps. There are a number of mobile phone apps to help users find the nearest station.

== Technology ==
The platform behind the bike share system was created by 8D Technologies, who also supply the server technology for BIXI Montréal, Citi Bike in New York City, Capital Bikeshare in Washington DC, Melbourne Bike Share in Australia, and others.

The Bixi technology was replaced in mid-2017 for TfL under the new contract with Serco, and now makes use of AI and big data to improve bicycle availability and maintenance. The new technology is a AWS hosted service and uses a combination of technologies including AWS, Opensource, IBM and Oracle.

The cycle hire app had received widespread and sustained criticism over its lack of basic functionality for many users. The Android version had an average rating of 1.1 out of 5 on the Google Play Store out of over 5,000 reviews in October 2026 and was last updated in July 2025. A new app, developed by Lyft, will be released on 17 November 2026, after a 4-day outage of the Santander Cycles service. It will introduce hiring through QR codes on bikes, will fix and improve payment methods on the app to make the hiring process simpler and faster, and will provide better journey planning.

== Finances ==
In the first three months of the scheme, 95 percent of journeys did not exceed 30 minutes, earning TfL access fees but no usage fees. The scheme generated £323,545 in revenue for usage in the first 96 days. Only 72,700 of the first 1.4 million journeys earned any revenue, with 44% of income coming from users charged the £150 "late return" fees. With an average £3,370 income per day from journeys, the scheme needed to grow substantially over the following five years to meet its cost. In this early period, there was a steady growth in the number of bike journeys. It was expected that when casual use was introduced, it would become the bigger revenue generator. Access fees were doubled in January 2013, which was expected to bring in an extra £4-6M annually. User satisfaction level dropped after the increase.

In May 2012, before access charges doubled in 2013, TfL estimated that the scheme would cost taxpayers £225M by 2015/16, almost five times the maximum due from Barclays.

TfL funded a net £3.6M to the scheme in the 2016/17 period during which around 10 million bikes were hired. This equates to 16.9% of the scheme's operating costs being funded by subsidy, and is on par with TfL's operating costs as a whole, which are 16.1% funded by subsidy (including the congestion charge as subsidy).

== Reception ==
The scheme debuted with great fanfare, with more than 90,000 users registering one million cycle rides being taken in the first ten weeks of operation. The millionth journey rider was awarded free membership to the scheme for five years for him and three friends.

In particular, the scheme was criticised for allowing riders to have unlimited use by docking the bike every 30 minutes at a station (the first 30 minutes' use are free) resulting in a dependence upon late fees and penalties to make up revenues. Other users complained of computer issues, erroneous charges, and problems with docking stations. The system requires the cyclist to find docking stations close to the points of departure and destination, lacking one of the key advantages of the bicycle in an urban setting. The system also does not enable transport to the suburbs; as TfL says, it is "best for short journeys". Some users also found the bikes too heavy and unwieldy, at 23 kilograms (51 lb).

In June 2011, TfL issued a "critical improvement plan" to the contractor, Serco, demanding immediate improvements in service, and in a comment to the press a TfL spokesman stated that "the service it (Serco) has provided for our Barclays Cycle Hire users has not reached the consistently high standards we expect," adding "We expect to see immediate improvements." Serco has in turn admitted that "some aspects of the service still need to be improved".

Redistribution of bikes has also been hindered by the refusal of the councils of Westminster and of Kensington & Chelsea to allow Serco to move bikes around their boroughs at night, between the hours of 22:00 and 08:00, creating significant challenges in meeting morning peak demand.

At the time of launch, anti-arms-trade campaigners protested against Barclays' involvement in the scheme and attached stickers to the bikes highlighting the bank's investment in the arms trade.

The scheme and those who delivered it achieved recognition from a wide cross-section of industries impacted by the project. A total of 15 awards were received within a year of launch recognising not just the impact on transport in London but also the innovative design, the public relations exercise and the challenging delivery timescales. Those awards included "Best Facility" from the London Cycling Campaign, and an Infrastructure award from the Institution of Civil Engineers.

== Repair and replacement ==
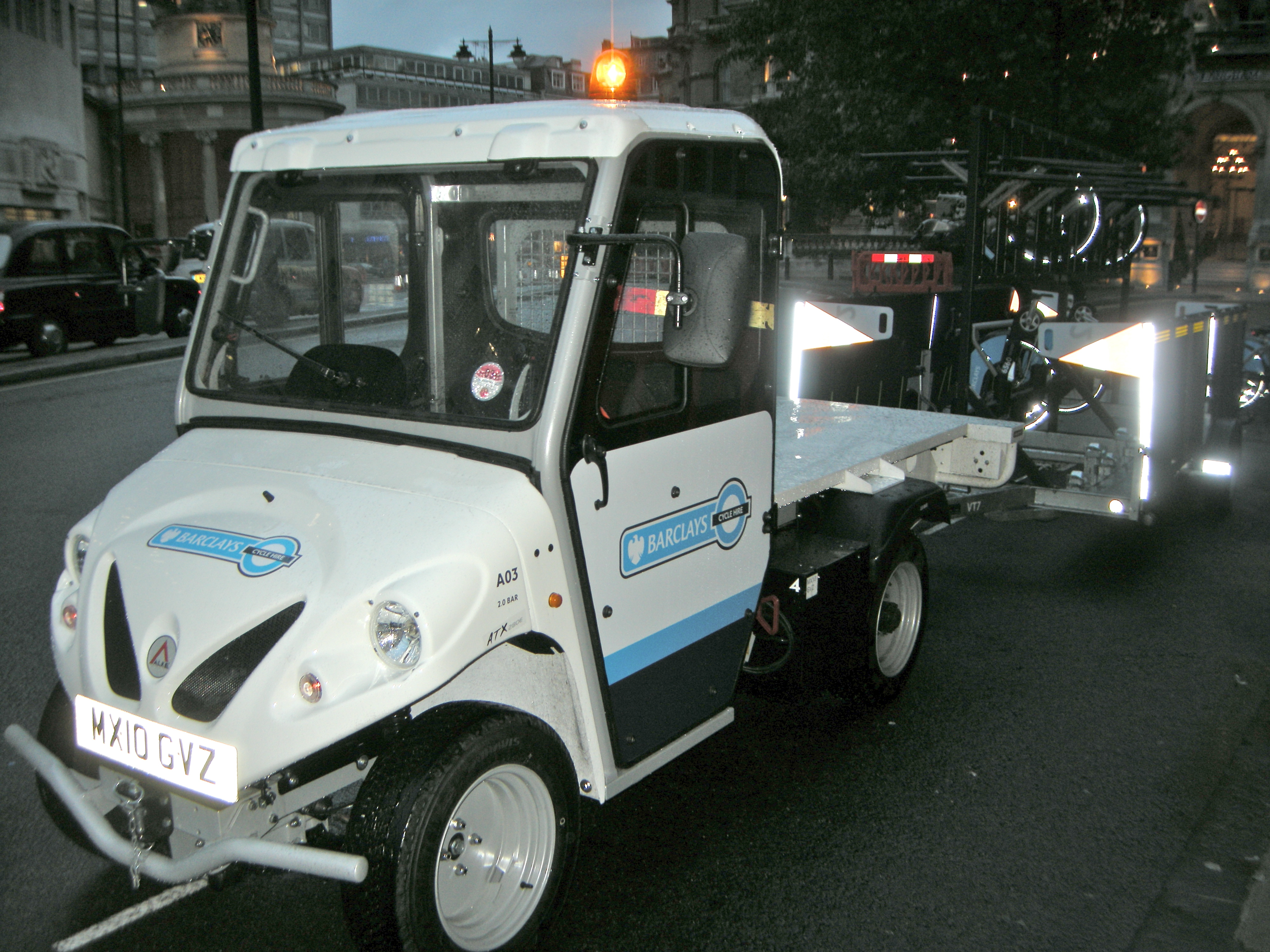
An Alkè ATX280E electric utility vehicle, used to redistribute bicycles

According to TfL, in the first six months of operation two-thirds of the fleet of London's Cycle Hire scheme fleet required repair. Serco, the company contractor for bicycle operations, was repairing more than 30 bikes a day as of February 2011, and at any one time around 200 of the 5,400 strong fleet were off the road for maintenance. By February 2011, three bikes had been damaged beyond repair while in service, and ten bicycles had been stolen. Six docking stations had been hit and damaged by motor vehicles and six had been vandalised.

== Prices ==
The pay as you go charge is £1.65 per every 30 minutes or part thereof for each bike hired. This can be paid on an app or at a street terminal alongside the bike docking stations.

Other ways to pay are through a Day Pass for £3.50, monthly membership fee of £20 or an annual fee of £120, which each give unlimited 60-minute rides during their time period. Day Passes can also be purchased at a street terminal.

Bicycles must be returned within 24 hours. Failure to return a bicycle or damaging one can incur a charge of up to £300.

E-bikes fees are set differently and require prior registration, which can be completed online.

== See also ==
- Lime
- Jump
- Forest
