= Alkè =

- Industry: Manufacturing
- Founded: 1992 in Padua
- Headquarters: Padua, Italy
- Key people: Achille Salvan Founder
- Products: Commercial vehicles, Electric Vehicles.
- Website: Alke.com

Alkè is an Italian truck, electric vehicles, and diesel engine manufacturer based in Padua, Italy. The company was created in 1992.

== Electric vehicles ==
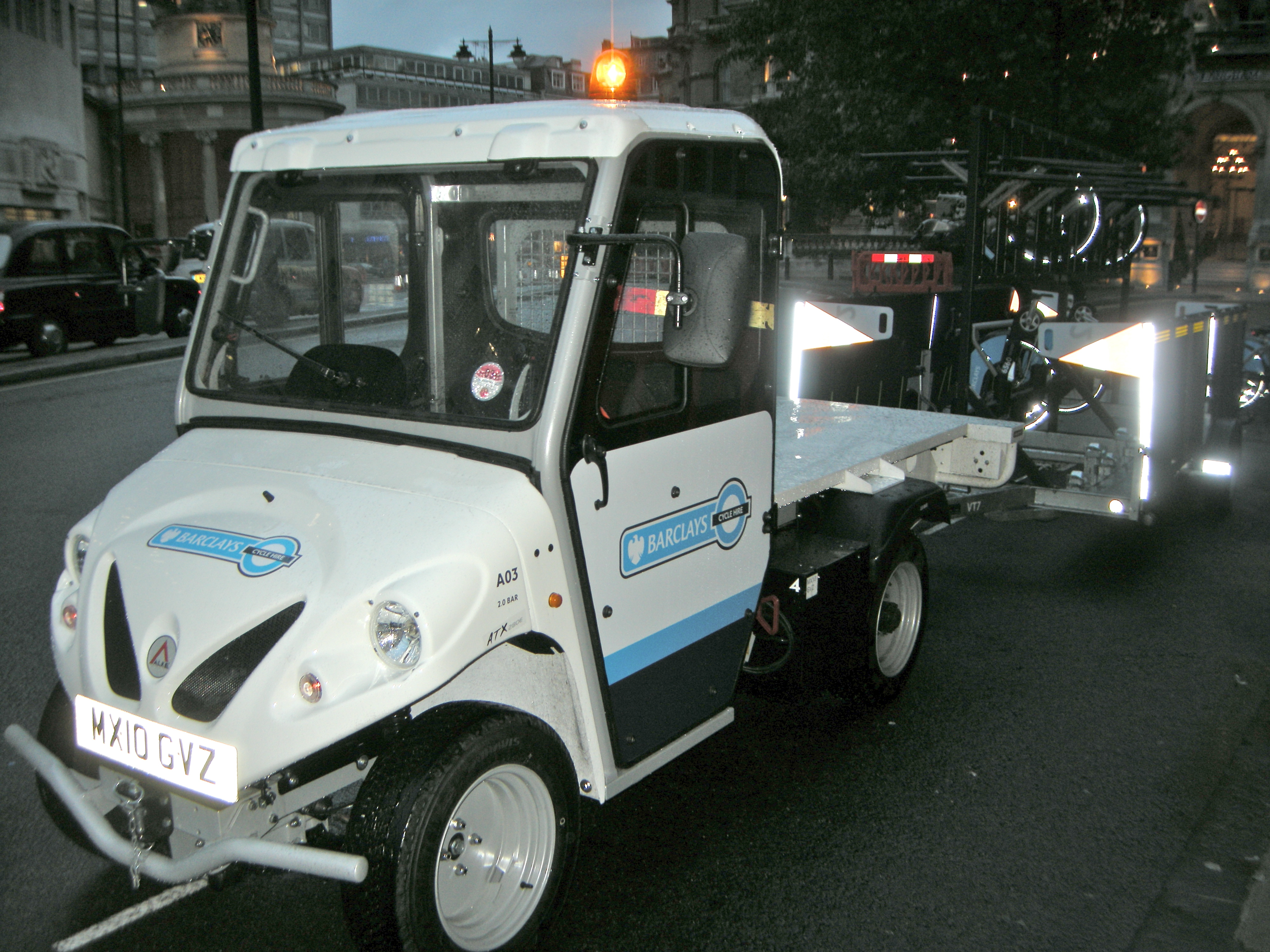
Alkè electric utility vehicle used for redistributing bikes in London's Santander Cycles scheme.

Some of the electric cars made by Alkè (for example the Alkè ATX 100 E) are used in soccer stadiums as open ambulances. The operator of London's cycle hire scheme uses a small number of Alkè electric utility vehicles (alongside other cars and vans) to tow trailers for distributing bicycles.

== Sustainable mobility ==
Due to the constant attention that electric vehicles gather on the market, Alkè is getting involved in many green mobility projects, in the public administration like the project Cargohopper (a solar powered vehicle for urban center delivery in the city of Utrecht) or in the private sector for mobility inside no traffic zones

== Motor Shows ==
Alkè vehicles can frequently be seen at the major Electric motor shows around Europe, such as: Pollutec, Saltex, GaLaBau, Kommunalmesse, BlueTech, Electri Motor Show (Finland); with many appreciations even from the Royal Families.

== Worldwide sales ==
Alkè electric vehicles are sold worldwide, through more than 30 resellers in different countries.

In UK Alké vehicles are imported by ePowerTrucks.
