= Cycles Devinci =

Canadian bicycle manufacturer

- Company type: Private
- Industry: sporting goods
- Founded: Chicoutimi, Quebec (1987)
- Headquarters: Saguenay, Quebec, Canada
- Products: bicycles
- Services: Research and development of bicycles, production of bicycles, OEM
- Owner: Felix Gauthier
- Number of employees: 51-200
- Website: www.devinci.com

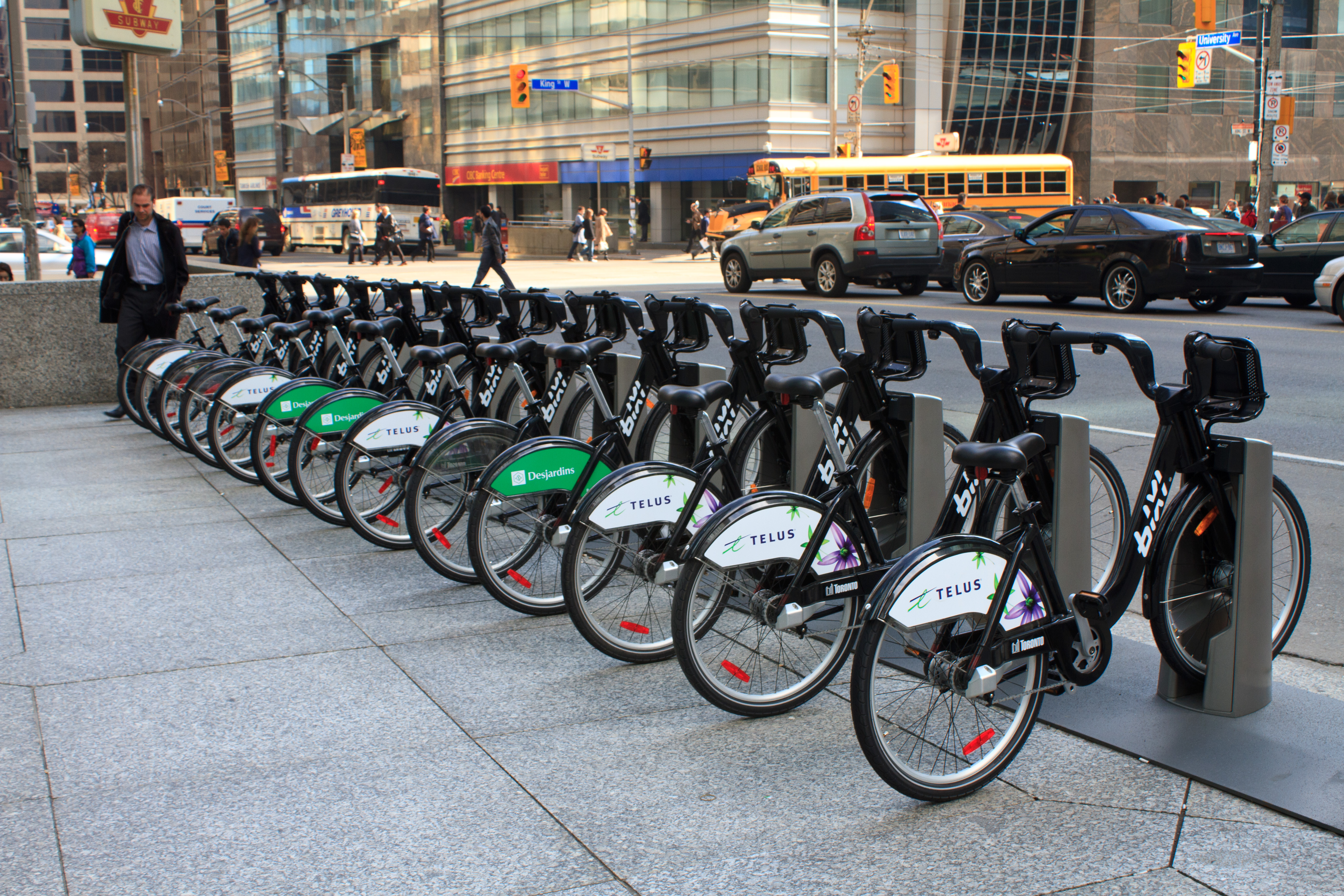
Bixi Toronto May 2011

Cycles Devinci is a Canadian bicycle manufacturer established in Chicoutimi, Quebec in 1987. In addition to a full line of road, mountain and hybrid bicycles, it also manufactures the BIXI-brand of bicycle used in bicycle sharing schemes in cities such as Montreal, Toronto and Minneapolis. In most cities, like Montreal, BIXI offers both normal and electric bicycles.

== History ==
Two students from Chicoutimi, Quebec, mechanical engineer Daniel Maltais and industrial designer Guy Ouellet, founded Devinci Bikes in 1987. Road biking entrepreneur, Felix Gauthier, purchased the company in 1990, moving the brand into its contemporary role as an international player in both road and mountain bike manufacturing. Under Gauthier the brand has grown its U.S. and international distribution channels. Gauthier has since taken over full ownership of the business.

In 1994, Gauthier founded Devinci's Research and Development Division. This led to the creation of Optimum frames, Ollie Freeride bikes, the Cx, and instrumented bikes.

In 2001, the firm moved from its 800-sq.-foot space to a larger, modernized plant. Over the next five years it built dual-suspension bikes with needle bearings, Cx road bikes with carbon monocoque frames, and introduced its Cyclocross product line. In 2004, the firm's Ollie model won 26 Magazine's "Freeride Bike of the Year" award.

In July 2010, Barclays Cycle Hire commenced operations with 5,000 bicycles and 315 docking stations distributed across the City of London area. There are now 10,000 Bixi rental bikes in use in London, now operated under the name Santander Cycles. In 2009, Canada Economic Development allocated funding to help Cycles Devinci acquire equipment and reorganize its plant to produce Bixi bicycles for Stationnement de Montréal and the Société de vélo en libre-service.
