= London Cycling Campaign =

British charity and lobby group for cycling in London

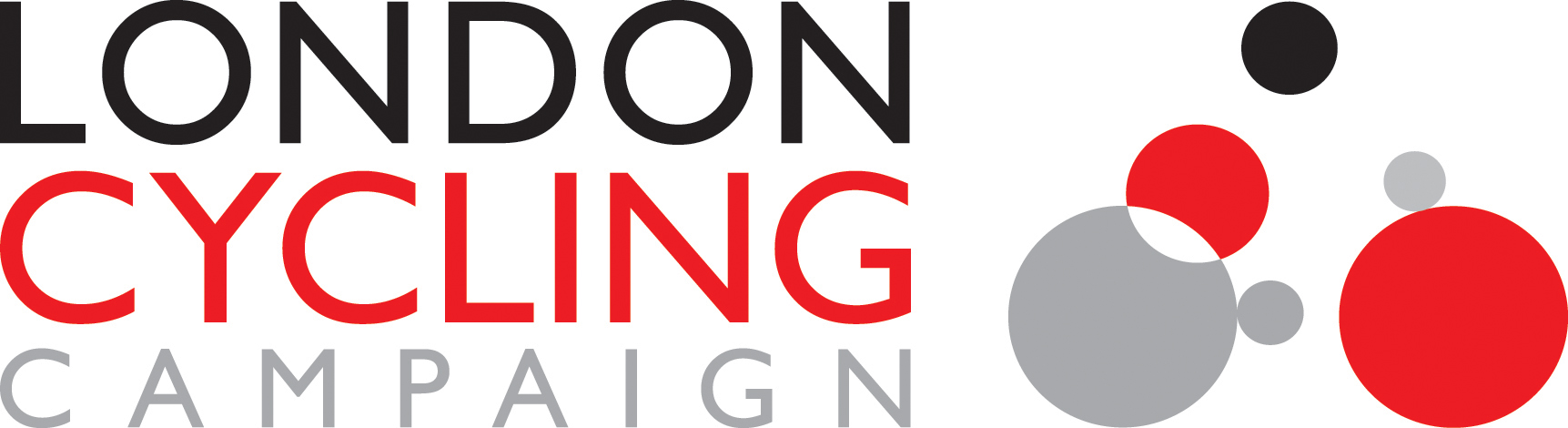
LCC logo

The London Cycling Campaign (LCC) is an independent membership charity lobbying for better conditions for cycling in London. Its vision is to make London "a world-class cycling city". It is one of the largest urban cycling organisations in the world, with over 11,000 members.

== Activities ==
LCC was formed in 1978, through the merger of several London-based pro-cycling groups, some supported by Friends of the Earth. The organisation was officially founded on 28 September 1978 at Ye Olde Cheshire Cheese public house on Fleet Street, and its first offices were at 40 James Street, London W1.

The organisation has grown steadily in membership and staffing over the years, and now employs 15 people to promote cycling, lobby government at all levels, and support its members. In 2006, the organisation became a charity to take advantage of more favourable tax conditions. Its head office is now located at Unit 201 Metropolitan Wharf, 70 Wapping Wall, London E1W 3SS.

LCC is not allied to any political party, but works with other organisations and individuals campaigning for more enlightened use of public space in the capital — such as Living Streets, CTC, Sustrans and RoadPeace.

The majority of LCC's funding comes from membership subscriptions and charitable grants.

LCC publishes a magazine for its 11,000 members, called the London Cyclist. The publication was originally called the Daily Cyclist, the name being a light-hearted parody of British newspapers. The magazine serves to keep members in touch with the organisation's campaigns, and is also sent to many decision-makers in the capital.

A number of independent cycling clubs affiliate to the London Cycling campaign which gives them the chance to support LCC's work and improve cycling for everyone in London, including London Clarion Cycling Club, London Dynamo and Islington Cycling Club.

== Campaigns ==
Campaigns have included:

- More cycle-friendly streets through the use of cycle lanes and traffic-calming
- Reducing the danger to cyclists from lorries or heavy goods vehicles
- Better cycle parking in and around workplaces, residences, town centres and public buildings
- More carriage of cycles on public transport, including railways, London Underground and buses
- Improving cycling access to London's parks and canal towpaths
- Reducing the problem of bike theft in Greater London
- Improving access to cycling for people of all abilities
- Retaining bollards on dangerous junctions
- bike marking and registration mandatory

LCC campaigns are backed up by a network of local LCC member groups at the London borough level. Local LCC groups liaise with their local Borough Council, relevant Transport for London Streets Management section, Sustrans and other statutory and non-statutory authorities to comment on local plans and developments that affect cyclists, pedestrians and the local environment.

== Borough groups ==
There is a local group for each London borough. Groups also organise cycle rides and other social events.

== See also ==
- Cycling in London
- Utility cycling
