= Forest (bicycle-sharing system) =

Dockless bicycle hire service in London

Human Forest Limited
- Founded: 2020; 6 years ago
- Area served: London
- Products: Dock-less bicycle sharing services
- Website: forest.me

Forest (formerly HumanForest), is an e-bike company based in London, United Kingdom. It operates dockless rental e-bikes across 20 boroughs and, with more than 20,000 bicycles, Forest is one of the three main e-bike operators in capital city, competing with Santander Cycles (docked) and Lime.

== History ==
Forest launched as HumanForest in 2020, by Agustin Guilisasti (CEO of Forest ) and Ignacio Guiterrez Del Pedregal (chair of Forest and CEO of Admoai). They brought on more "co-founders" later, including Caroline Seton to handle regulation and Mike Stewart to build the brand (CMO of Forest).

It was shut down within months after someone was injured due to a faulty e-bike. The company recalled all of the bikes and replaced them, restarting service in 2021.

These services replaced Chinese companies Mobike and Ofo after their insolvencies and removal.

In August 2023, the service was renamed Forest.

Forest has continued to expand, growing from 800 e-bikes in September 2021 to 20,000 e-bikes today with a registered customer base of over 1.5 million.

== Service ==
=== Usage ===
Users rent Forest bikes through a mobile application which takes payment and offers controls, such as the ability to pause and end rides, as well as report faults and track usage. A GPS system embedded within bikes enforces boundary, speed, and parking restrictions, and serves as an enabler of maintenance and battery replacement for Forest crews.

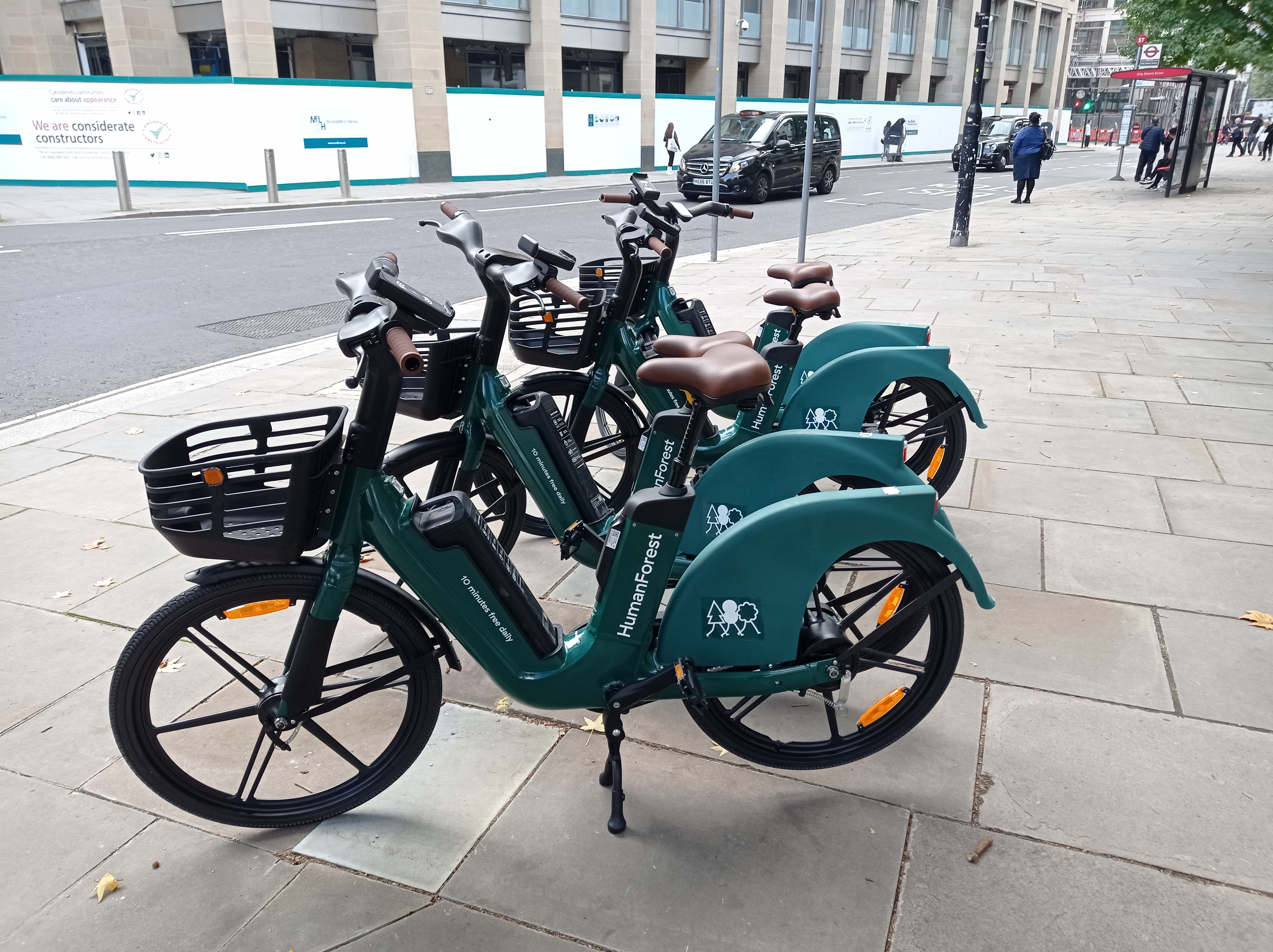
Human Forest e-bikes in London, 2021

=== Cost and fees ===
The service charges riders £1 to unlock their ride, and rewards them with 1 minute for parking in borough designated parking areas.

In 2025 they introduced a new model, allowing riders to earn one of three tiers of free riding: one to five minutes, 10 minutes or 30 minutes, depending on the status of the e-bike they choose. Riders who pick bikes in overcrowded bays or those that have been left idle for extended periods are rewarded with more free minutes, incentivising users to book those most in need of moving. (users still need to pay an "unlock fee" for every ride, which is currently £1).

Their Forest Flex subscription model, priced at £6.99 a month, offers riders discounted e-bike journeys up to 30 minutes long.The subscription gives riders access to 10-minute rides for £1 and up to 30 minutes for £1.70. Any additional time is charged at Forest’s standard pay-as-you-go rate of £0.33 per minute.

Forest is ad-supported by partners such as Deliveroo, Virgin, Octopus Energy, Whole Foods and Universal.

As of September 2026, the company offers third party liability insurance to protect people injured and property damaged by cyclists on their e-bikes.
