= Cycling in Munich =

Transport by bicycle in Munich, Germany

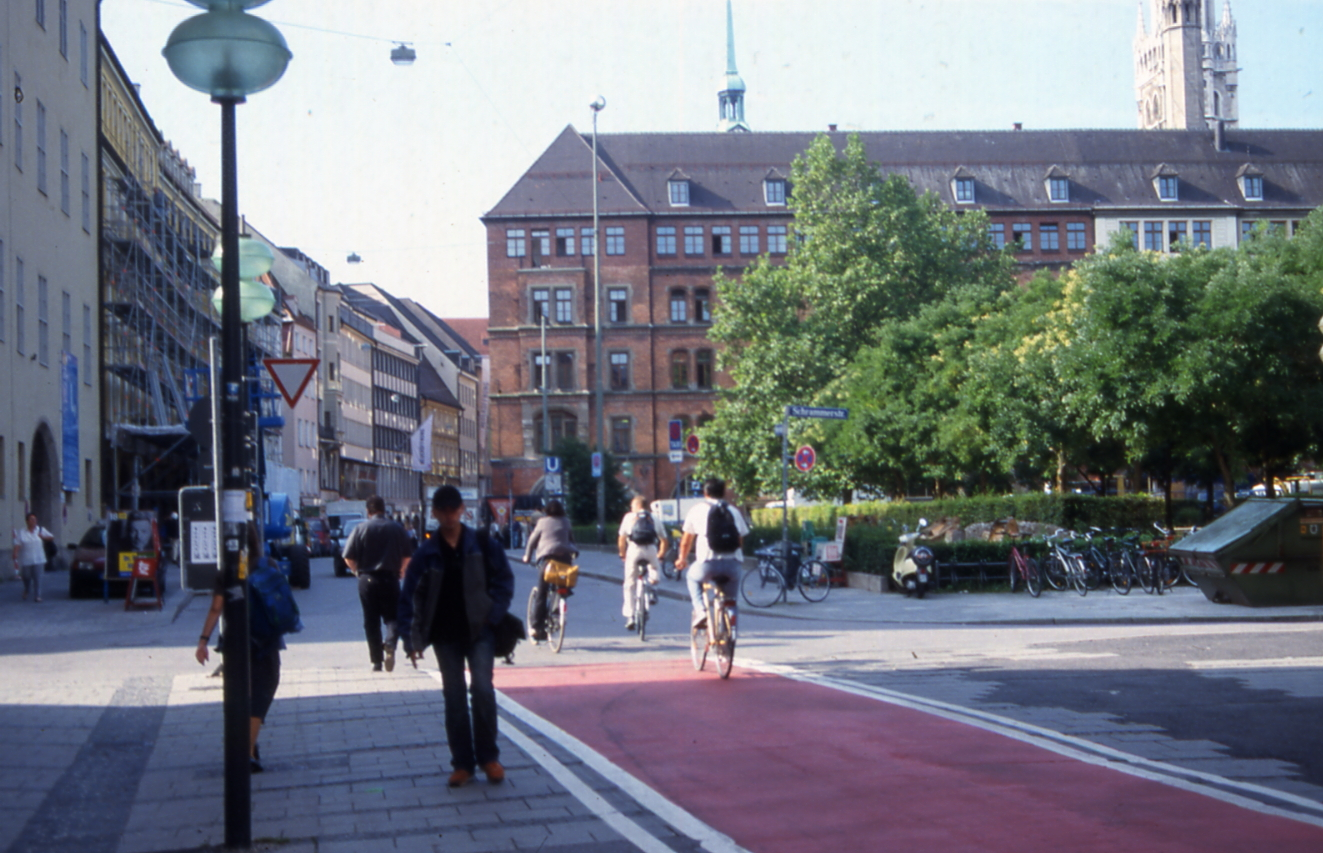
Bike path in central Munich

Cycling accounts for 18% of all traffic in the German city of Munich. This makes Munich the leader in bicycle modal share amongst the large German cities; as a result, Munich named itself Germany's Radlhauptstadt (bicycle capital) in the summer of 2010. Around 80% of the population of Munich own a bicycle.

Between 1992 and 2010 a total of €32 million was spent on new infrastructure to expand Munich's cycling network including bicycle parking. For reasons including environmental sustainability, the city aims to increase cycling's modal share to 20% of all trips by bicycle by the year 2015: for this additional financial resources for infrastructure, public relations exercises and public events has been allocated and, from 2010, annual expenditure to promote cycling will triple to €4.5 million.

== Bicycle network ==
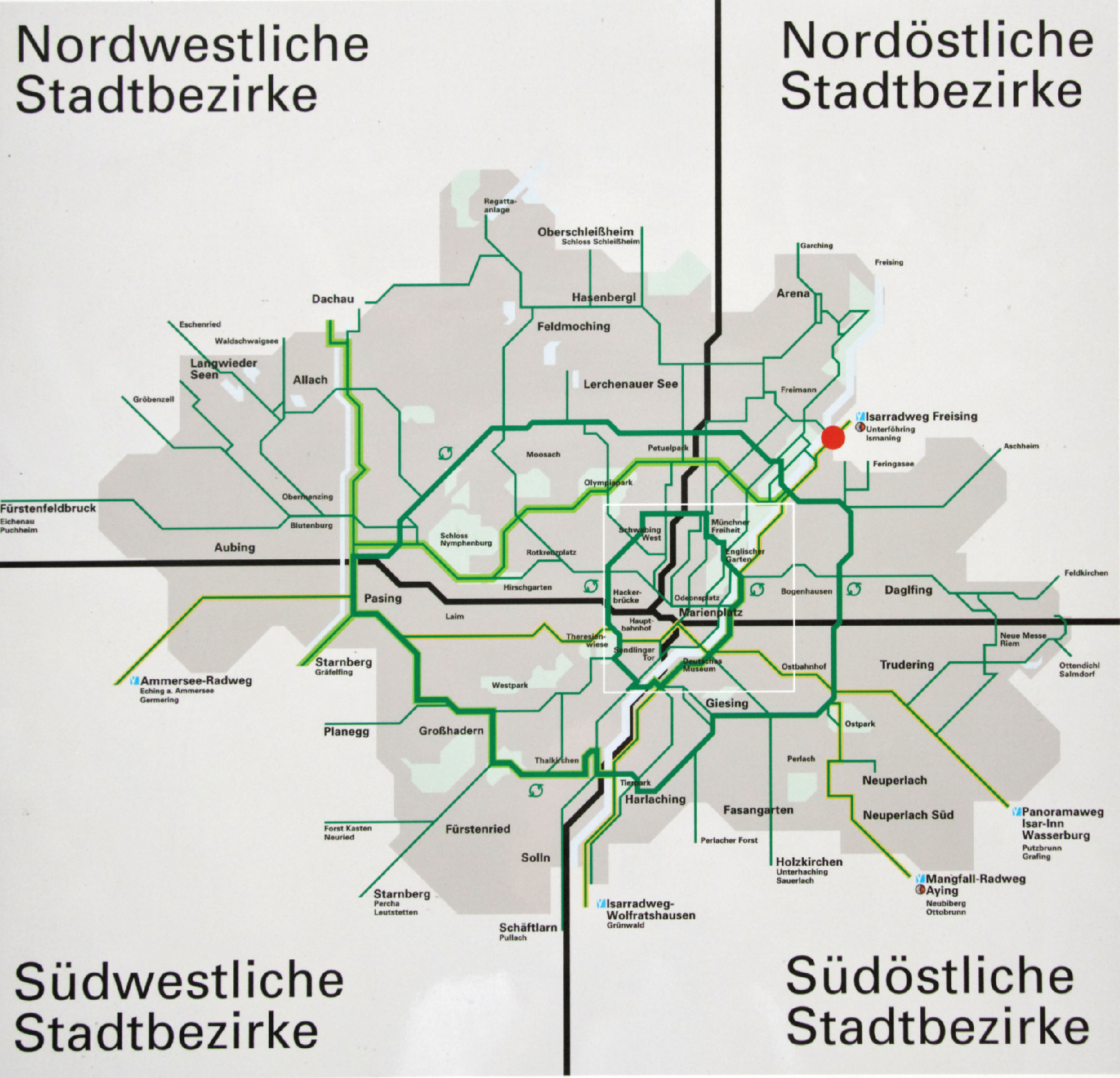
Map of Munich's cycling network

Munich's cycling network totals more than 1,200 km (750 mi) in length, a figure more than 50% of the total length of Munich's road network. The city has 212 one-way streets which are open in both directions to cyclists (i.e. contraflow). There are also dedicated Fahrradstrassen (bicycle streets) where motor vehicles are limited to 30 km/h (19 mph) and where cyclists are allowed to use the full width of the road.

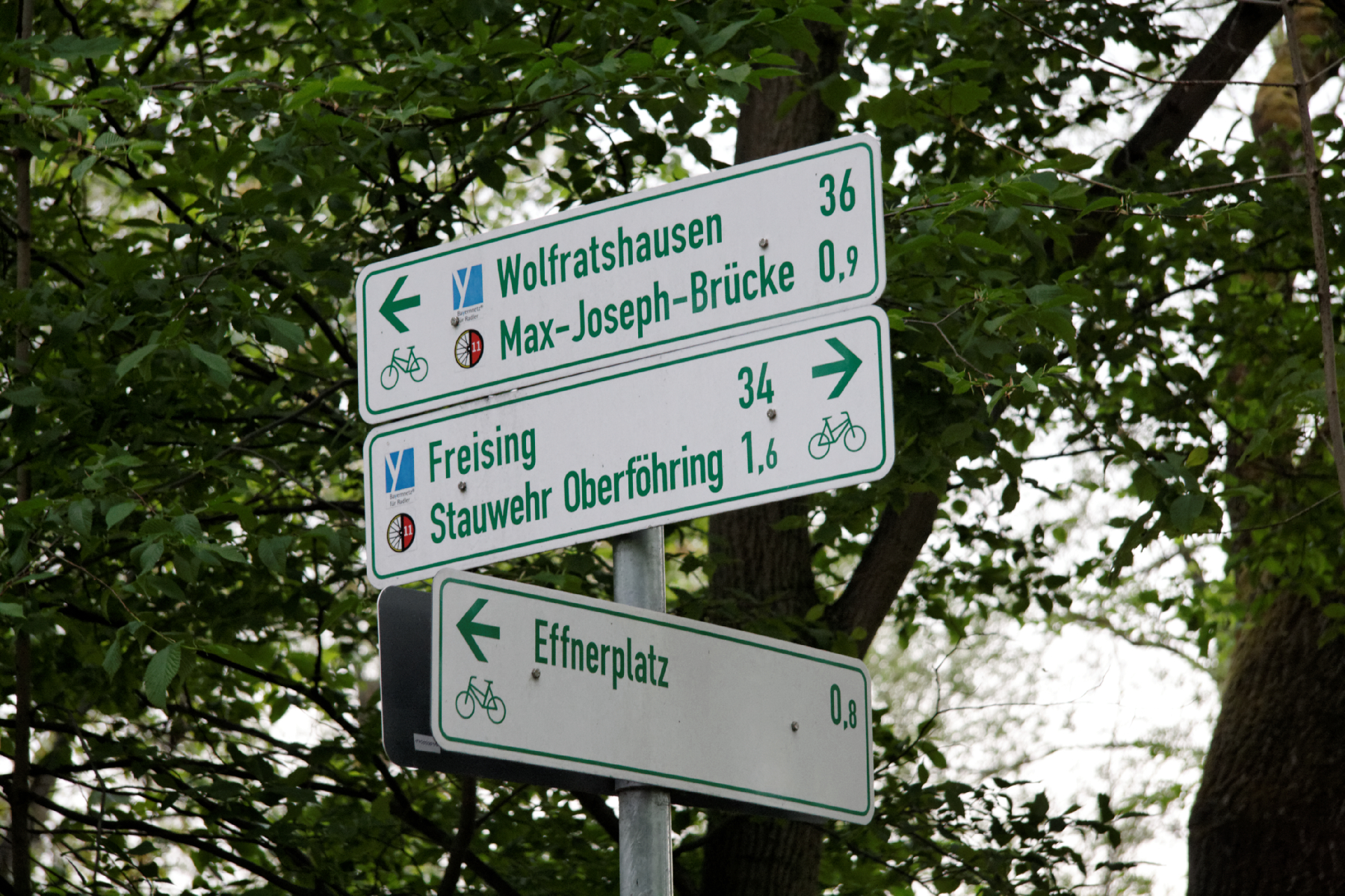
An example of cycling network signage in Munich. This one is by the River Isar.

Since 2007, the street signage for Munich's bicycle network has slowly been replaced by new green and white signs, whose font size is twice as large as previous, and the destinations and distances are marked. Signed bicycle routes connect points in the city in ways that are suitable for cyclists and there is minimisation in obstruction on roads by pedestrians and better flow through traffic lights. The latter, of course, applies only to a small number of cyclists as bicycle speeds vary widely, being completely dependent on the ability of the rider. The reduced obstruction by pedestrians is still much higher than that on the road, meaning that the concentration requirements are much high for cyclists than drivers, lowering convenience.

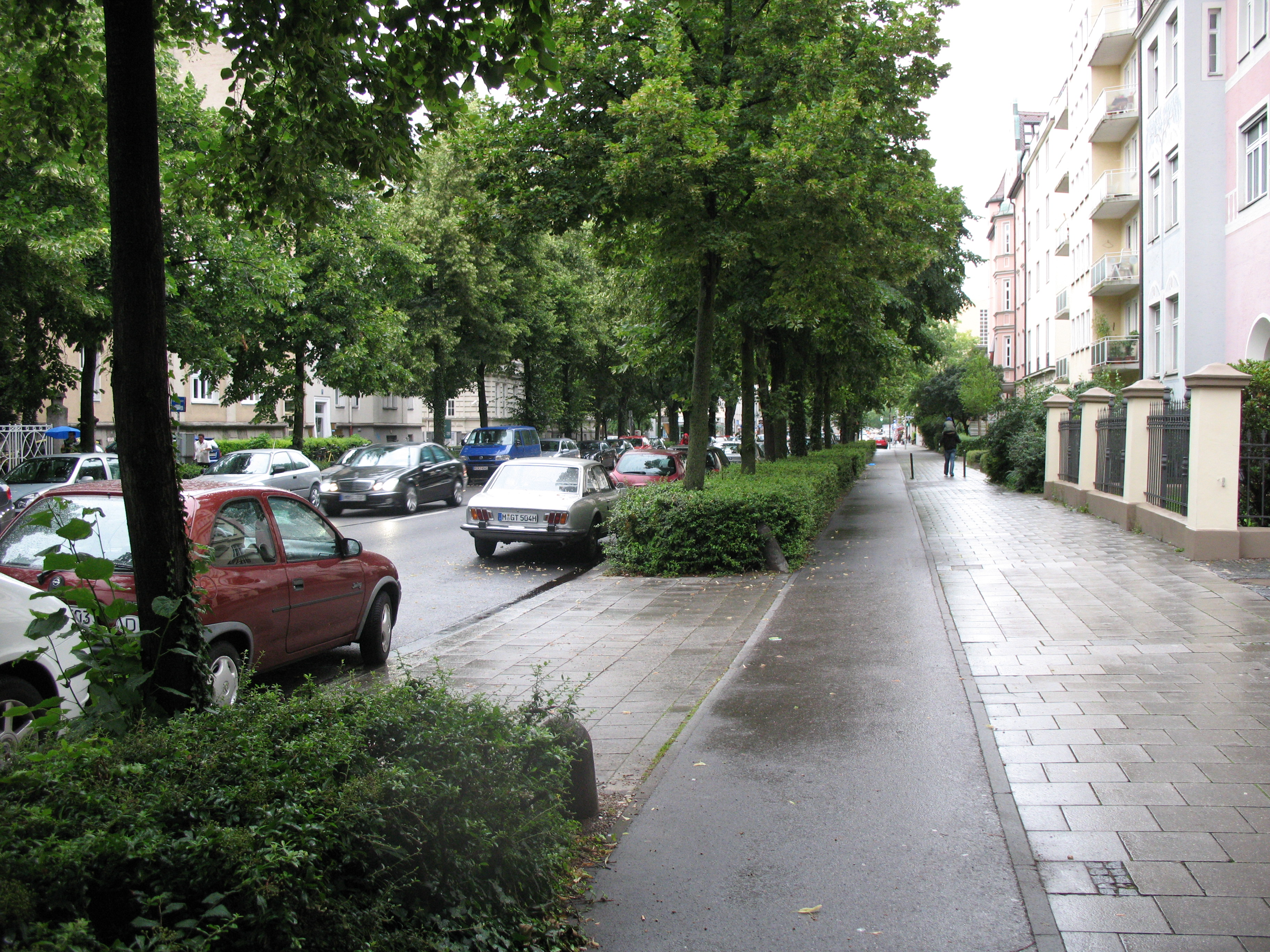
Bike path along Goethestrasse in Munich

As of 2012 there are about 32,000 bicycle racks in the urban area not including the 50,000 bicycle parking spaces at bus stops and public transport hubs. However, the space dedicated to them is very low.

== Public bicycle hire system ==
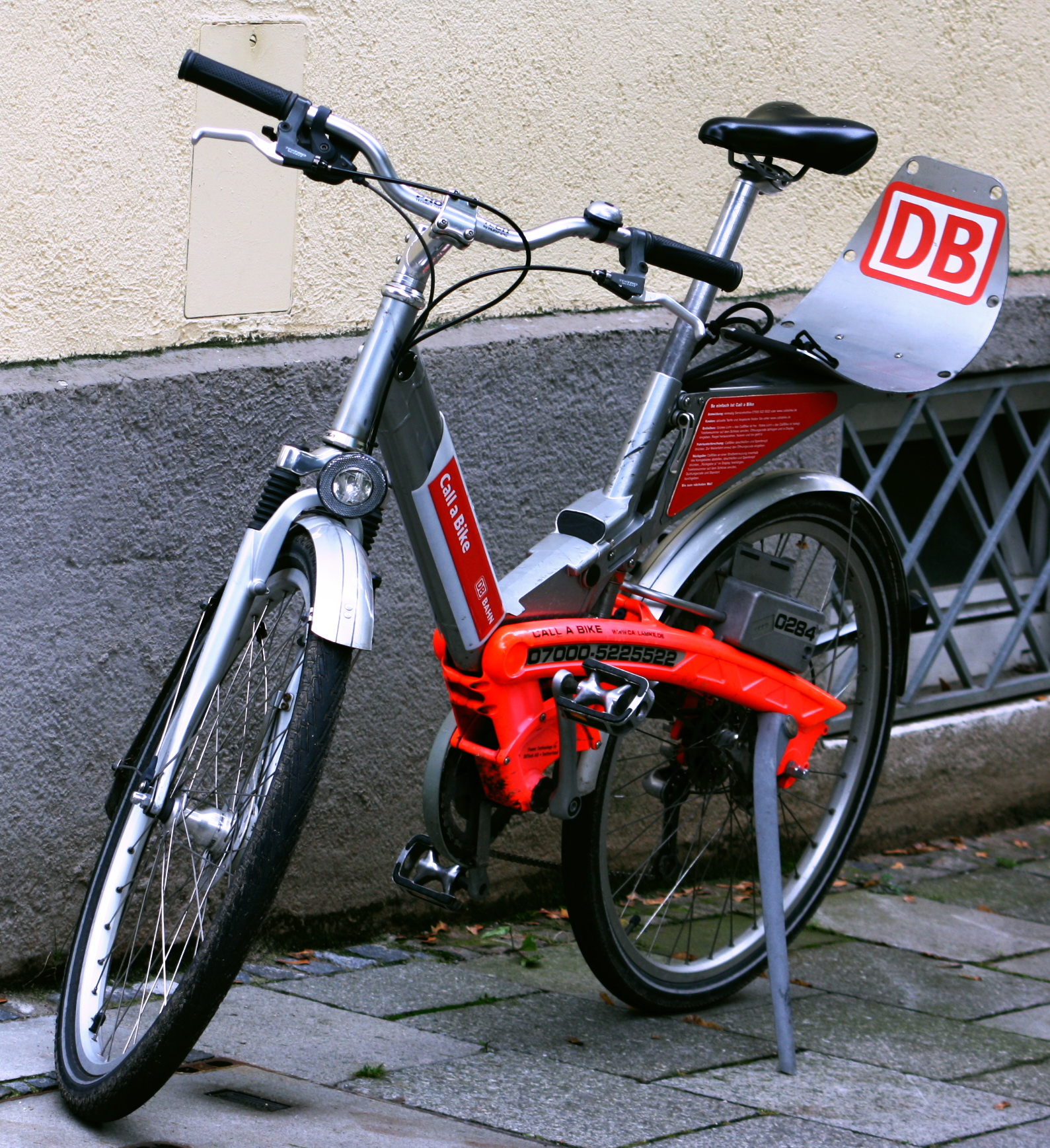
A Call a Bike public bicycle in Munich

Munich's bicycle hire system, the Deutsche Bahn run Call a Bike, is available in the central area of the city, that part of Munich surrounded by the ring-road known as the Mittlerer Ring. There is a new system as of Summer 2015, called MVG-Rad, run by Nextbike, with special tariffs for users of public transport.
