= EMT Madrid =

Public transport company in Madrid, Spain

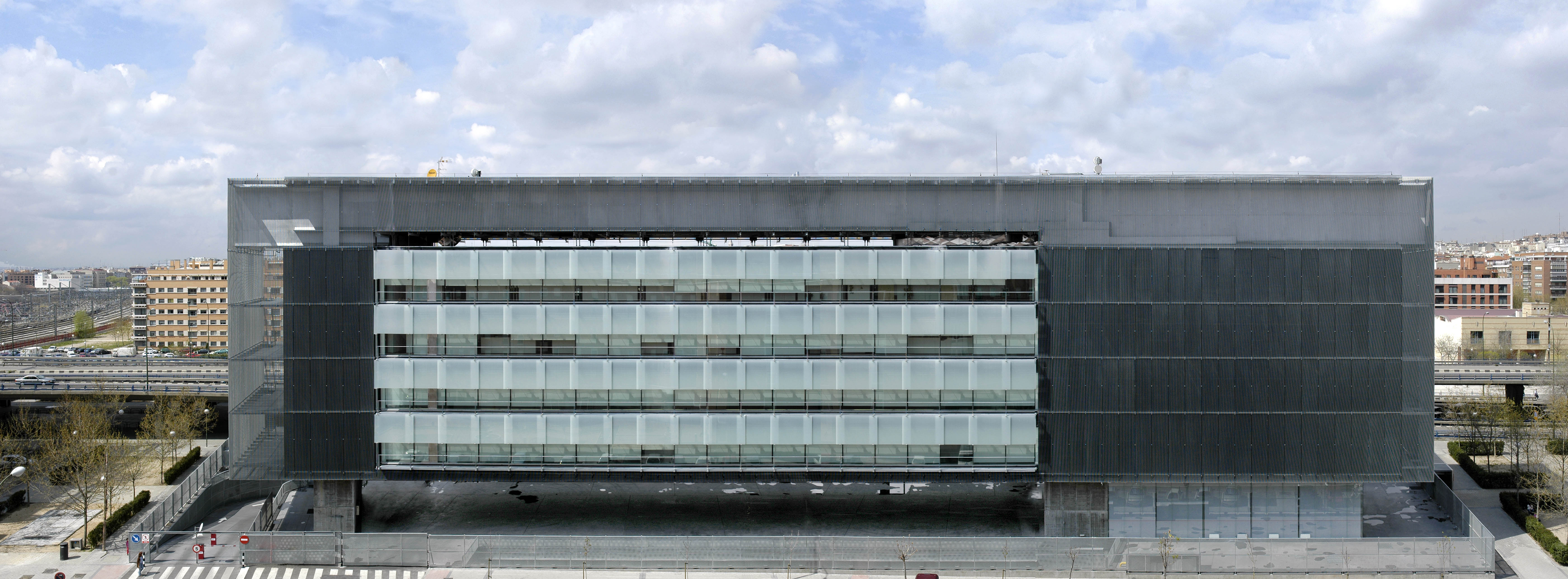
- Company type: sociedad anónima
- Founded: November 11, 1947; 78 years ago
- Headquarters: Cerro de la Plata, 4; 28007 Madrid
- Area served: Madrid
- Key people: Inés Sabanés Nadal (Chairwoman); Álvaro Fernández Heredia (CEO)
- Services: bus transport, bicycle-sharing system, public car and bicycle parking system, gondola lift
- Number of employees: 8,540
- Website: www.emtmadrid.es

EMT Madrid (short for Empresa Municipal de Transportes de Madrid, Spanish for "Municipal Transport Company of Madrid") is the company charged with the planning of public urban transport in the city in Madrid, Spain. The organization is wholly owned by the City Council of Madrid and is a member of the Consorcio Regional de Transportes de Madrid. Among the services provided by EMT Madrid are urban bus transportation as well as the BiciMAD bicycle-sharing system.

EMT Madrid, Europe's second-largest municipal bus operator, achieved a significant milestone by completing the elimination of all diesel buses from its fleet by the end of 2022. This transition resulted in a fully modernized fleet consisting solely of gas-powered, hybrid, and fully electric buses.

== History ==
EMT Madrid was established on 12 November 1947 after the Joint Transport Company dissolved. It was originally a municipal private company and became a joint stock company in 1971. It provided trolleybus service until 1966 and tram services until 1972.

The company's buses were originally blue, a legacy of the Madrid Tram Society, before they were transitioned to red between 1974 and 1986. Light blue natural gas buses were introduced in 1992. In June 2008, a new bus fleet was introduced with a lighter shade of blue, replacing the red fleet.

The company's logo was originally a round E inside an M and T. In the late 1970s, this was changed to two crossing red arrows (or yellow arrows on a red background). In 2010, a blue logo was introduced, mirroring the color change of the buses from two years earlier, with the letters "EMT" above a square with the city's coat of arms alongside the word "Madrid!". In 2018, the logo was changed to a lowercase "e" followed by a ">" sign, styled as blue on a white background, or vice versa.

== Multimodal public transport ==
=== City bus lines ===
The EMT manages a fleet of over 2,000 buses distributed in 223 lines that have an extension of 3,500 kilometers.

As part of EMT's added value there is an open data system for the "Smart City", CCTV and free WiFi connection both in the most relevant stops and in the whole bus fleet.

To reduce the volume of polluting gases emitted by its vehicles through the use of alternative energies such as compressed natural gas, biodiesel, electric traction, hydrogen, bioethanol; intensive renewal of the fleet with conventional diesel buses with strict environmental requirements.

The buses in Madrid are the only public transport system available around the clock as the metro network closes down between 02:00 and 06:00 am. The night buses, also known as "Buhos" (Owls), operate from 23.45 to 06.00 am. The heavy traffic in Madrid can in some cases make the city buses a fairly slow form of transportation but the city of Madrid has more than 90 km of special bus and taxi lines to help solve this issue. Buses serving the outer areas are run by 33 private companies, coordinated by the Consorcio Regional de Transportes de Madrid. This network is fundamentally radial.

== BiciMAD ==
In May 2016, with the municipalization of the bicycle rental service (until then operated by Bonopark S.L.) by the City Council, the EMT assumed the management of this service with 7,500 bicycles.

== Gallery ==
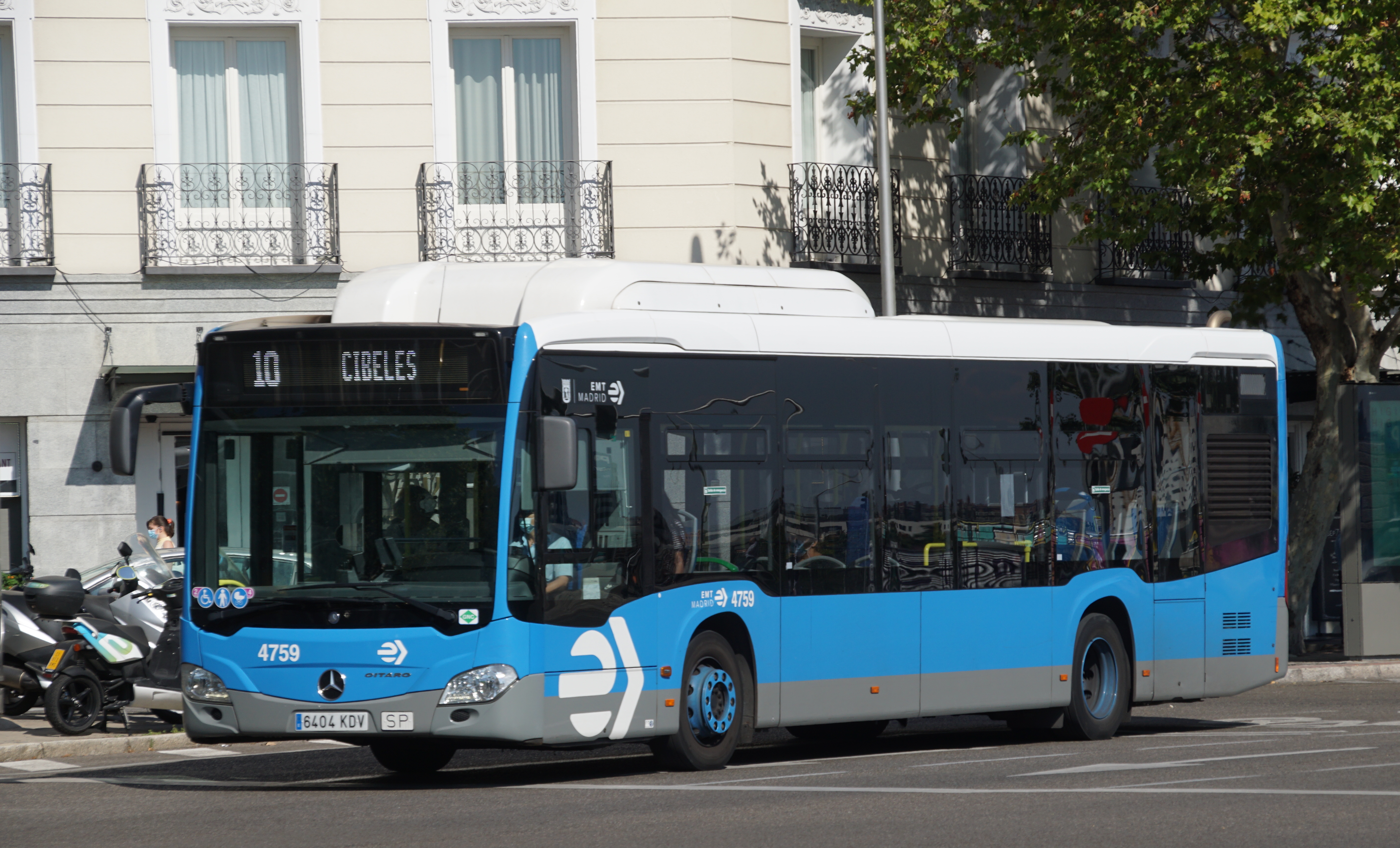
Mercedes-Benz Citaro NGT

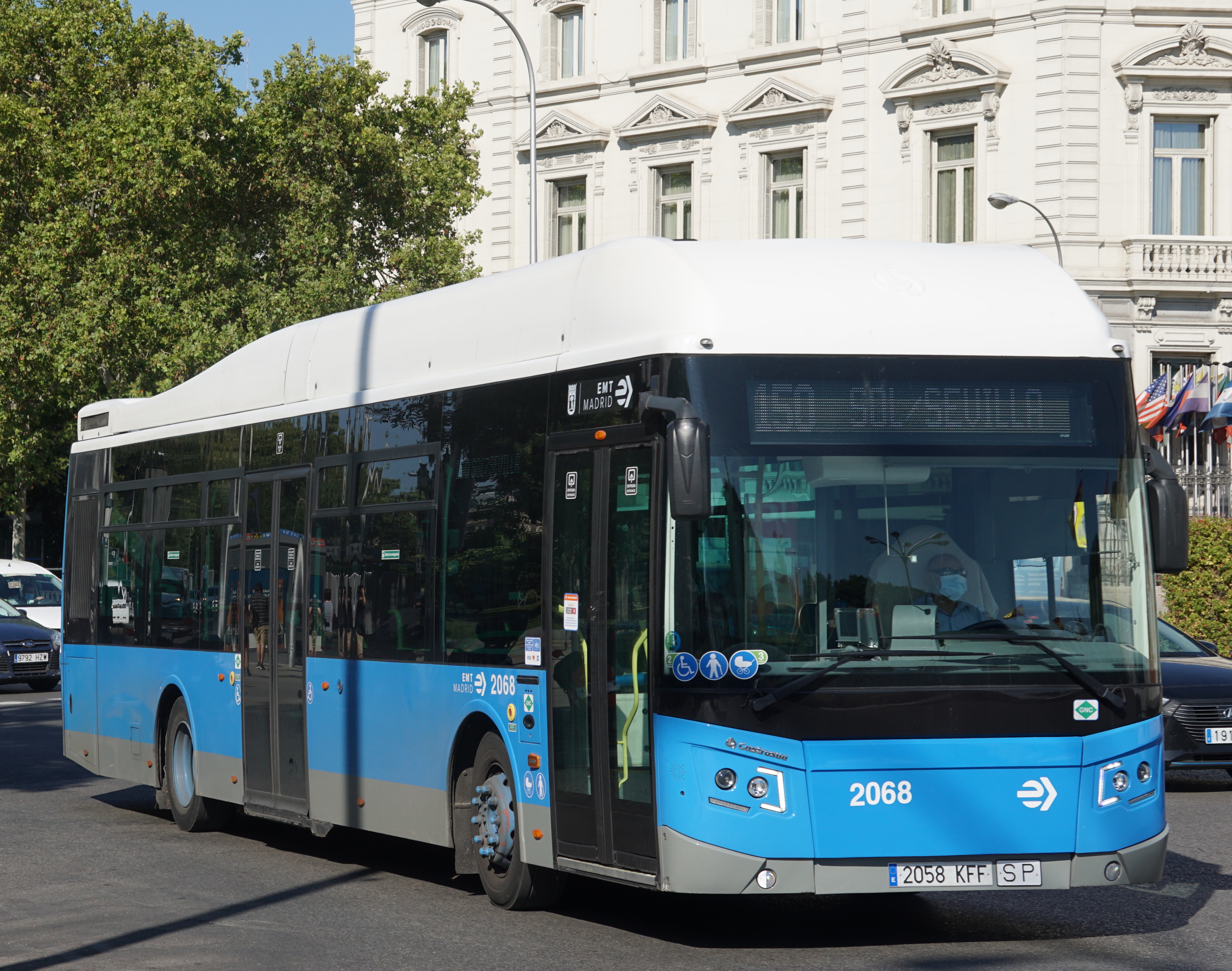
Castrosua New City on Scania N280UB CNG

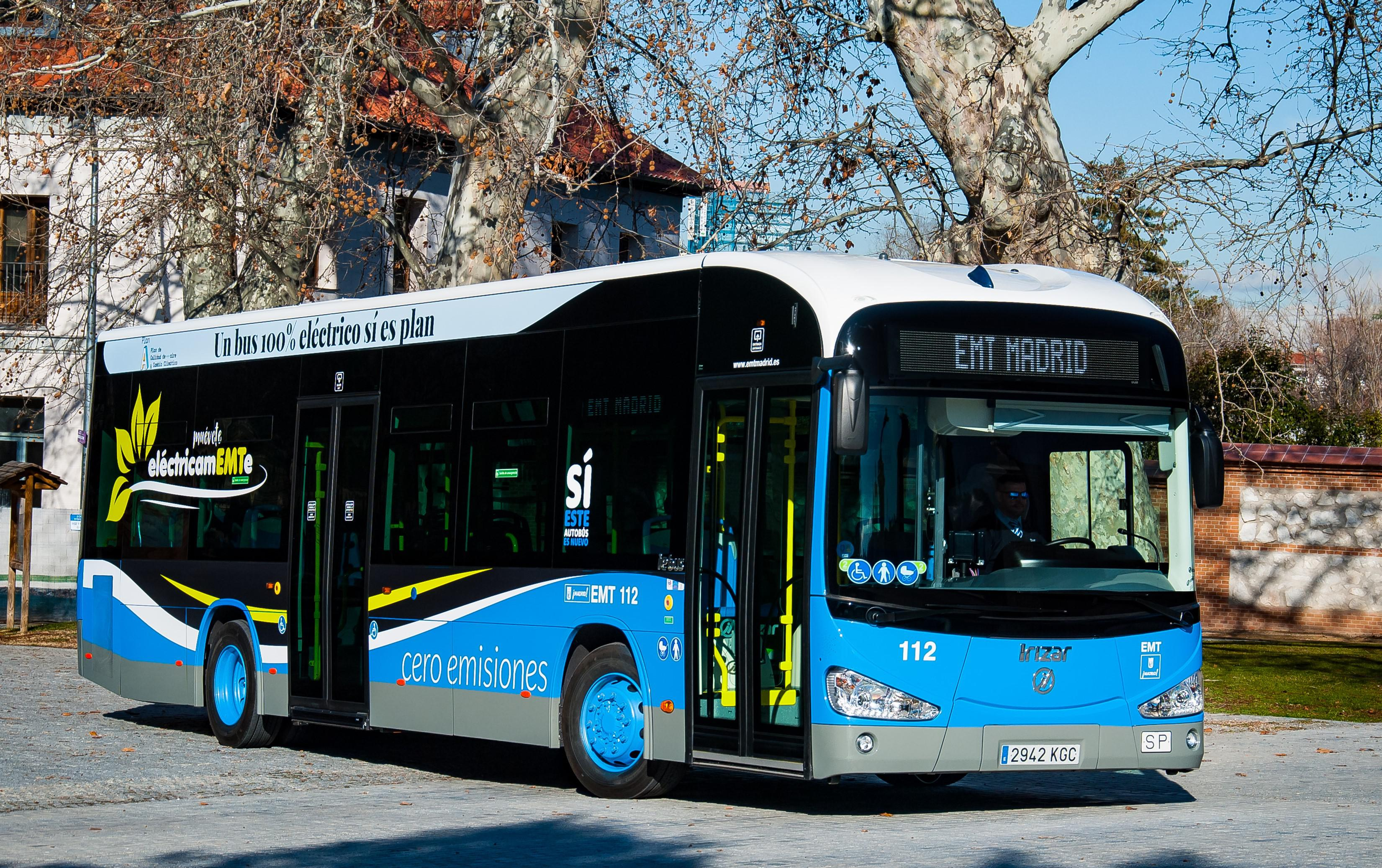
Irizar e-mobility electric bus

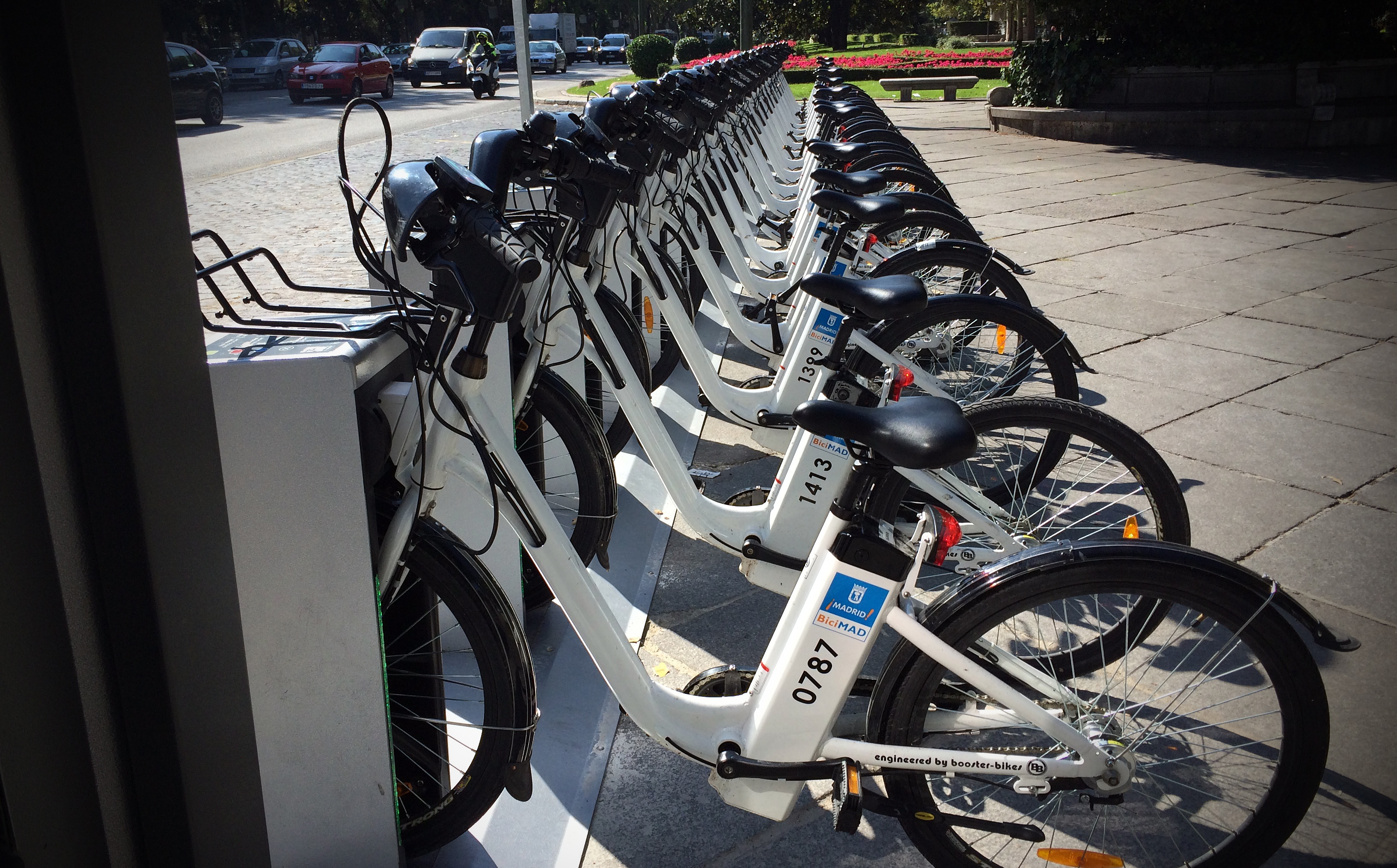
BiciMAD bike-sharing service (operated by EMT Madrid since 2016)

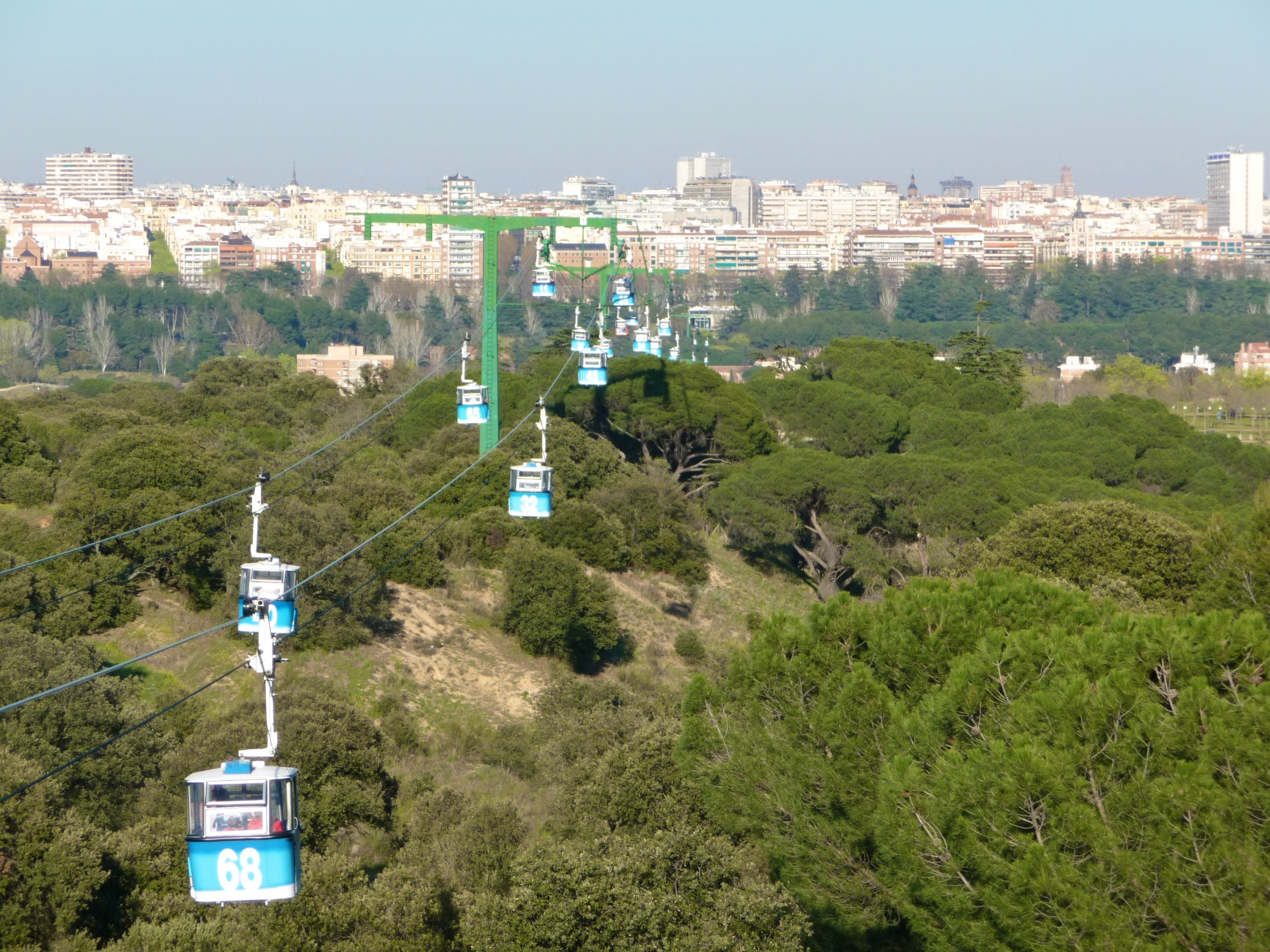
Teleférico de Madrid (operated by EMT Madrid since 2018)

== See also ==
- Madrid Metro
- Cercanías Madrid
- Transport in Madrid
