= BiciMAD =

Public bicycle system in Madrid, Spain

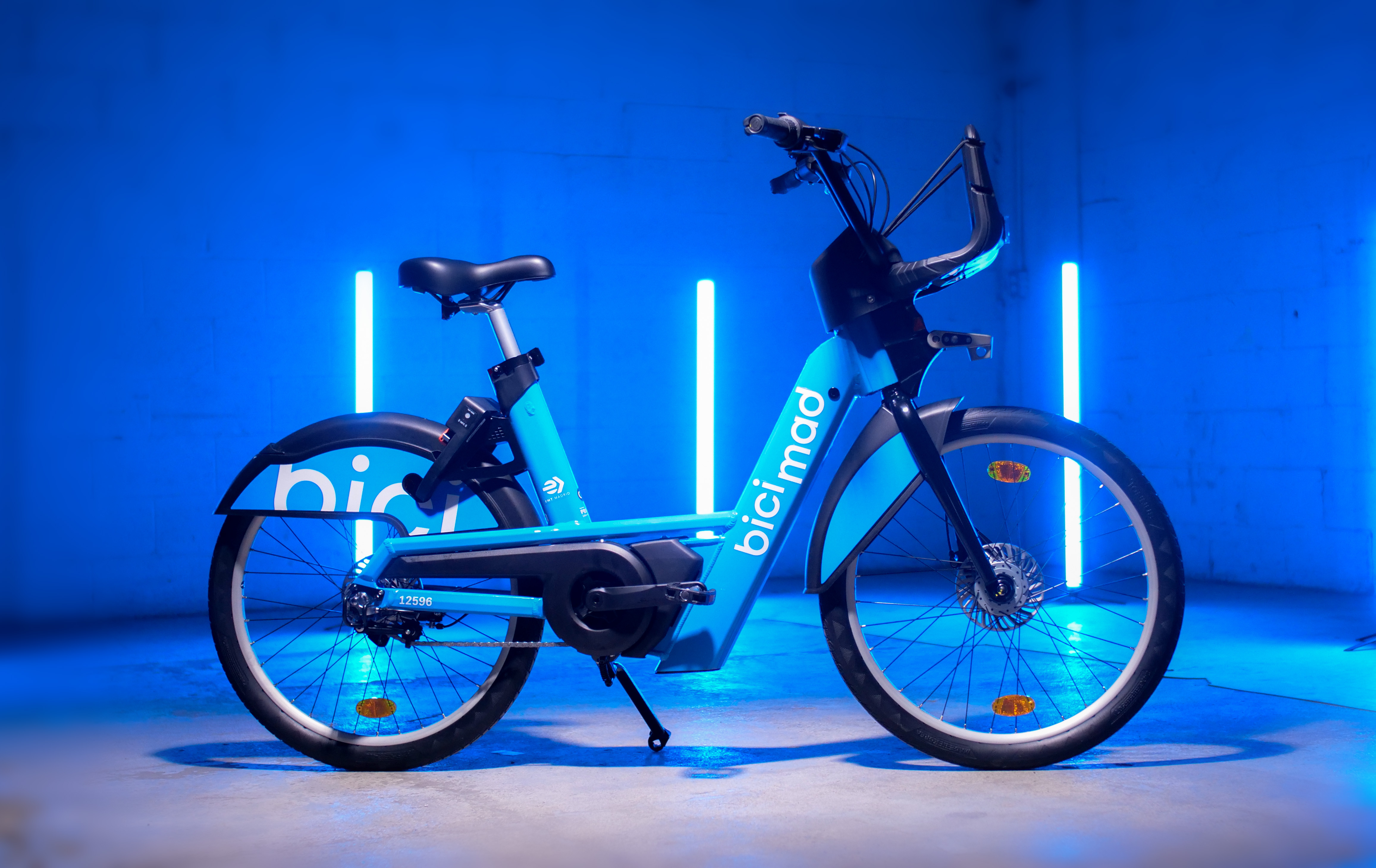
- The new bicycle by PBSC Urban Solutions

Overview
- Owner: City Council of Madrid
- Locale: Madrid
- Transit type: Bicycle-sharing system
- Number of stations: 611
- Annual ridership: 7.440.000 (2022)
- Website: bicimad.com

Operation
- Began operation: June 23, 2014; 10 years ago
- Operator(s): EMT Madrid
- Number of vehicles: 7500

BiciMAD is a bicycle sharing system in Madrid, Spain. It is currently provided by the Empresa Municipal de Transportes de Madrid, a public company owned by the City Council of Madrid.

The service, originally granted to Bonopark SL, began operations on 23 June 2014. It was municipalized by the City Council on 17 May 2016. BiciMAD reached the number of 16,000 daily transportations for the first time in September 2018. As of March 2021, the system comprises 2964 bikes and 264 stations.

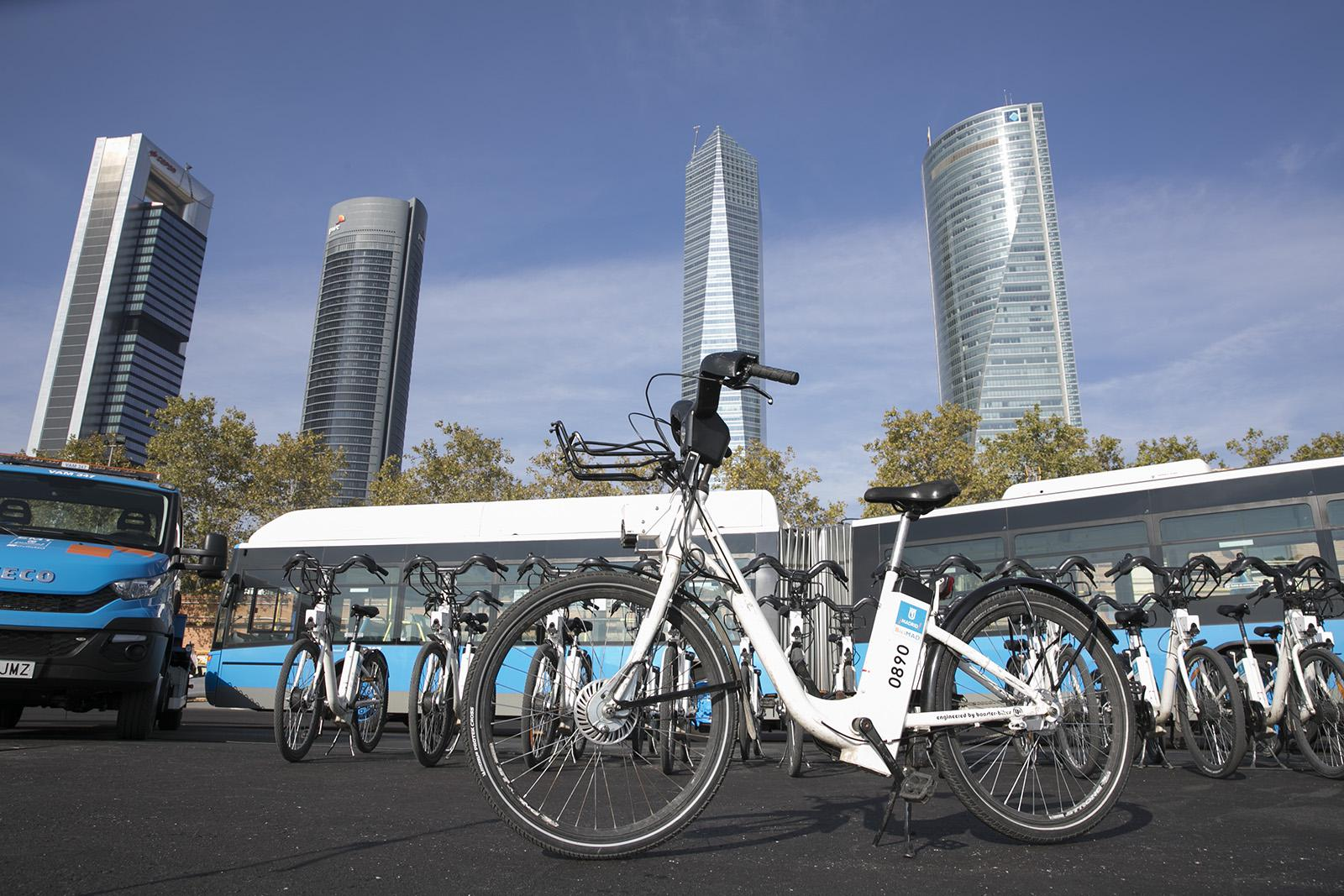
BiciMAD bikes in 2018

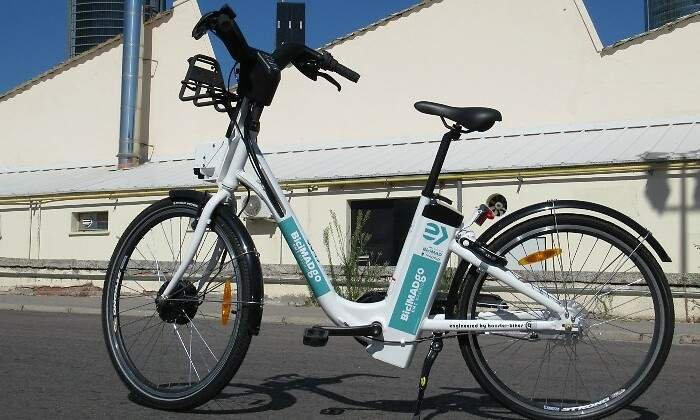
A BiciMAD go bike

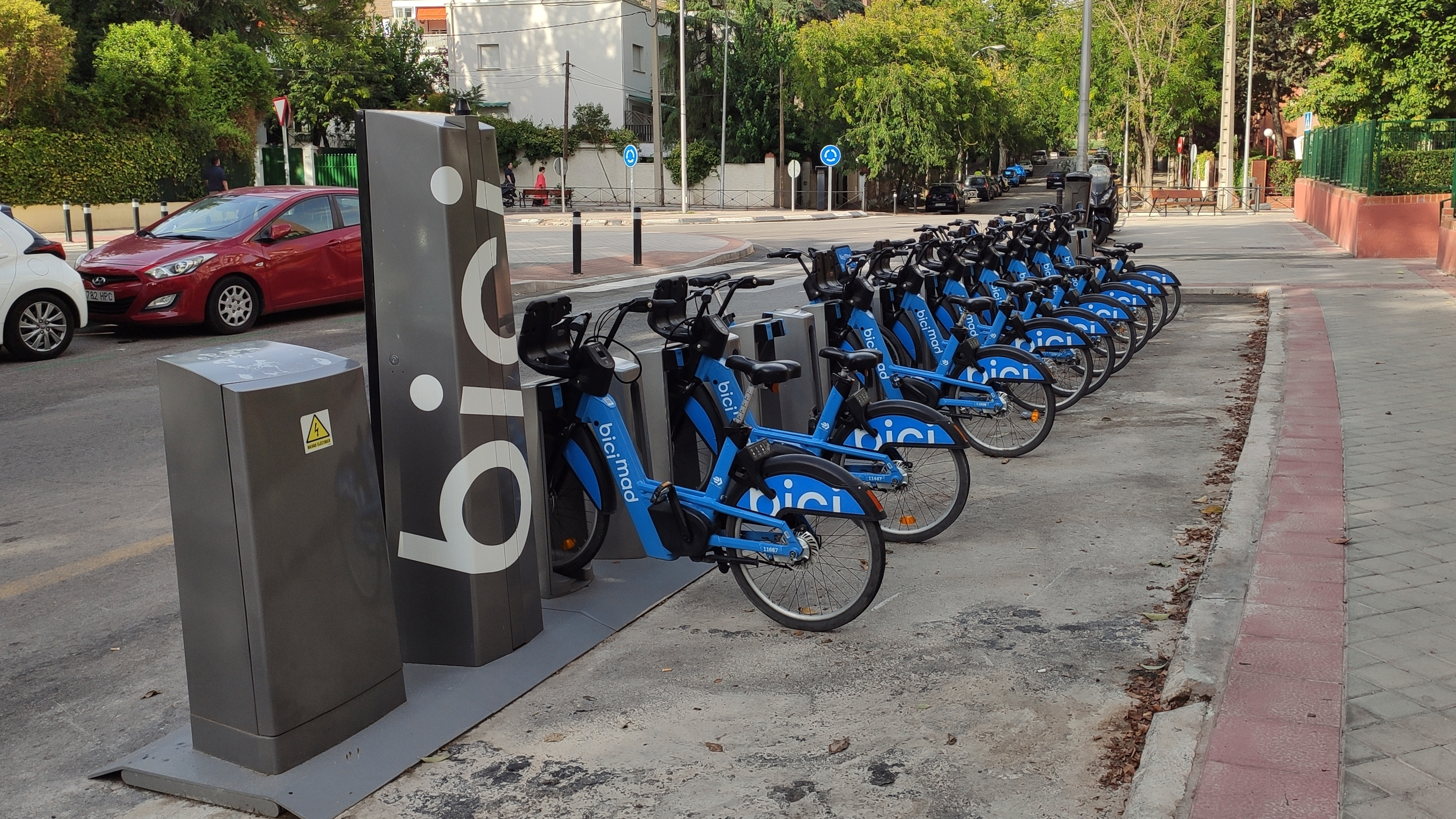
Docked bicycles, made by PBSC, Calle del General Kirkpatrick, Madrid, August 2024
