= Compressed natural gas =

Fuel gas mainly composed of methane

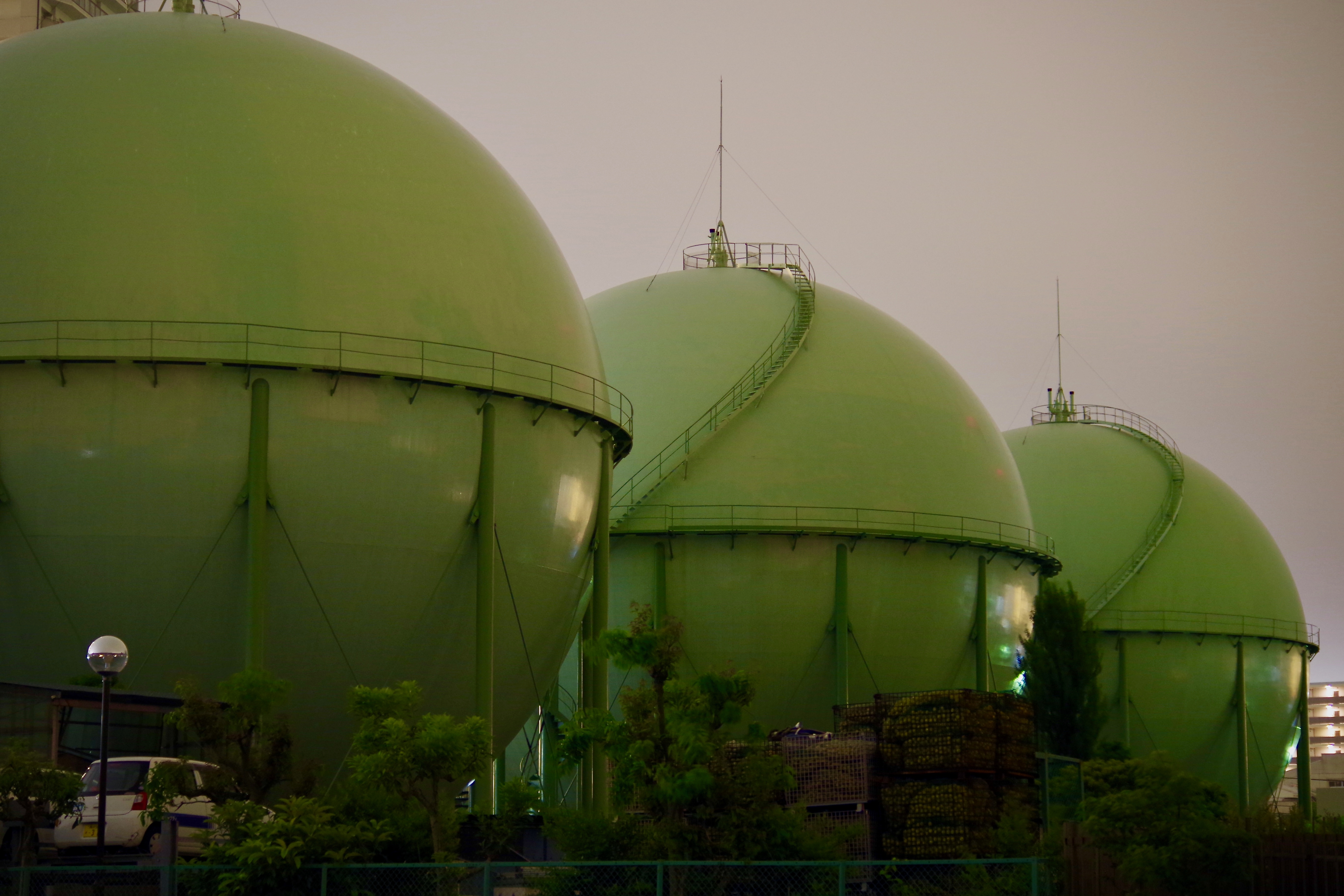
Spherical natural gas storage tanks storing compressed natural gas in Japan

Compressed natural gas (CNG) is fuel gas composed primarily of methane (CH_{4}), compressed to less than 1% of its volume at standard atmospheric pressure. It is stored in high-pressure containers at approximately 20–25 megapascals (2,900–3,600 psi; 200–250 bar), typically in cylindrical or spherical shapes.

CNG is used in modified petrol and internal combustion engine vehicles as well as purpose-built CNG vehicles. These include dedicated CNG systems, dual-fuel vehicles that combine CNG with liquid fuel, and bi-fuel vehicles. It can serve as an alternative to petrol, diesel fuel, and liquefied petroleum gas (LPG). Compared with these fuels, CNG combustion produces lower emissions of several pollutants. Because natural gas is lighter than air, it disperses more readily when released. Biomethane derived from anaerobic digestion or landfill sources can also be used.

CNG has been used in applications including auto rickshaws, pickup trucks, transit and school buses, and trains. Municipal fleets and public transport operators have often adopted the fuel for cost and infrastructure reasons. However, fuel storage and cylinder cost remain significant factors affecting wider adoption.

== Energy density ==
CNG's energy density is the same as liquefied natural gas at 53.6 MJ/kg. Its volumetric energy density, 9 MJ/L, is 42% of that of LNG (22 MJ/L) because it is not liquefied, and is 25 percent that of diesel fuel.

== History ==
Gases provided the original fuel for internal combustion engines. The first experiments with compressed gases took place in France in the 1850s. Natural gas first became a transport fuel during World War I. In the 1960s, Columbia Natural Gas of Ohio tested a CNG carrier. The ship was to carry compressed natural gas in vertical pressure bottles; however, this design failed because of the high cost of the pressure vessels. Since then, there have been attempts at developing a commercially viable CNG carrier. Several competing CNG ocean transport designs have evolved. Each design proposes a unique approach to optimizing gas transport, while using as much off-the-shelf technology as possible, to keep costs competitive.

In the early 2000s, Canadian company SeaNG developed the Coselle system, a novel CNG carrier design that used coiled steel pipe cartridges to store compressed natural gas more efficiently. This approach received classification approval and demonstrated a potential alternative to traditional vertical pressure vessels, which had been previously limited by high costs and weight.

Around the same time, major classification societies such as Det Norske Veritas (DNV) and the American Bureau of Shipping (ABS) introduced formal certification rules for CNG carriers. These standards helped establish safety and design criteria that allowed CNG vessel projects to progress toward commercial viability, promoting broader acceptance within the maritime industry.

Following these developments, new CNG carrier designs emerged, including EnerSea Transport's VOTRANS system, which utilized horizontal pressure vessels to reduce structural stress and improve cargo handling efficiency. Additionally, modular designs like the GASVESSEL project explored composite cylinder technologies to enhance flexibility and lower operational costs.

== Uses of CNG ==
=== Motor vehicles ===
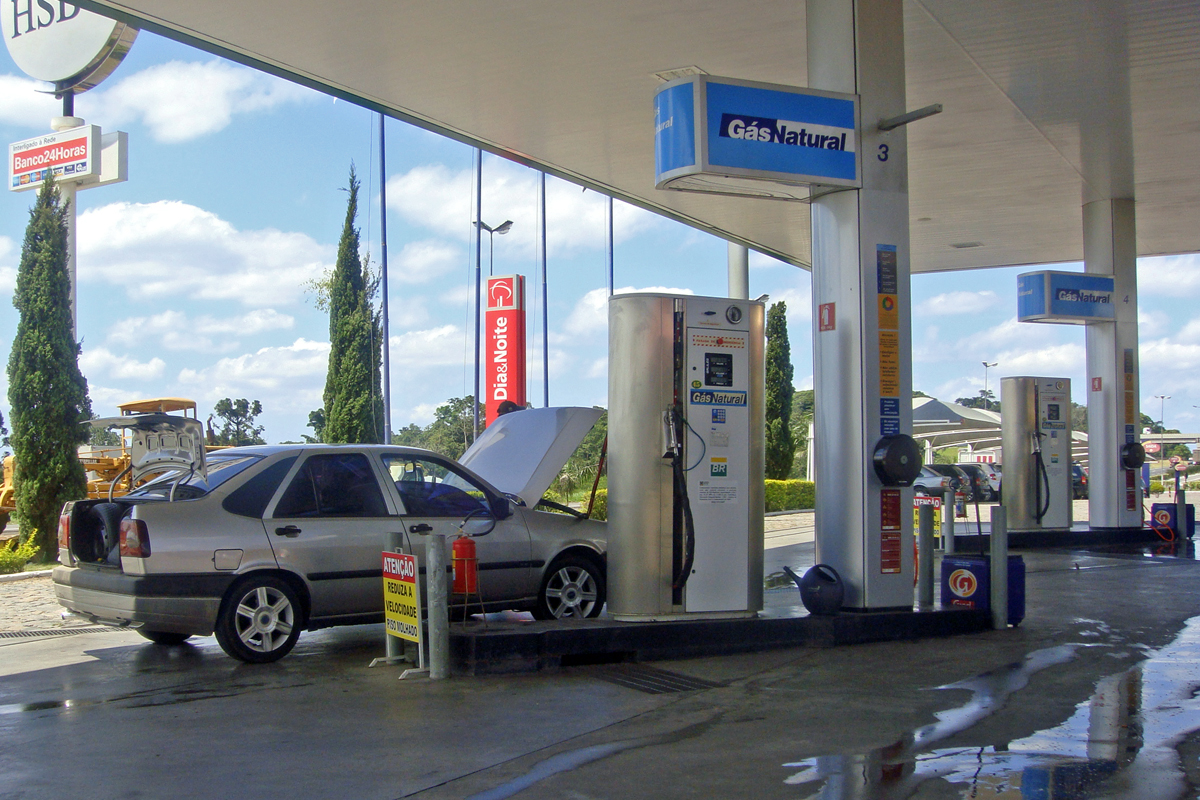
CNG pumps at a Brazilian fueling station

Worldwide, there were 14.8 million natural gas vehicles (NGVs) by 2011, with the largest numbers in Iran (4.07 million), Pakistan (2.85 million), Argentina (2.07 million), Brazil (1.7 million) and India (1.1 million), with the Asia-Pacific region leading with 5.7 million NGVs, followed by Latin America with almost four million vehicles.

Several car and vehicle manufacturers, such as Fiat, Opel/General Motors, Peugeot, Volkswagen, Toyota, Honda, Maruti Suzuki, Hyundai, Tata Motors, and others, sell bi-fuel cars. In 1995, The Supreme Court of India decided that cars put into circulation after 1995 would have to run on unleaded fuel. At the beginning of 2005, 10,300 CNG busses and 20,000 CNG cars ran on Delhi's roads. In 2006 Fiat Siena Tetrafuel was introduced in the Brazilian market, equipped with a 1.4-litre FIRE engine that runs on E100, E25 (Standard Brazilian Gasoline), Ethanol, and CNG.

Any existing petrol vehicle can be converted to a dual-fuel petrol/CNG vehicle. Authorized shops can do the retrofitting, which involves installing a CNG cylinder, plumbing, a CNG injection system, and electronics. The cost of installing a CNG conversion kit can often reach $8,000 on passenger cars and light trucks, and is usually reserved for vehicles that travel many miles each year. CNG costs about 50% less than petrol, and emits up to 90% fewer emissions than petrol.

=== Locomotives ===
CNG locomotives are operated by several railroads. The Napa Valley Wine Train in the US successfully retrofitted a diesel locomotive to run on compressed natural gas before 2002. This converted locomotive was upgraded to utilize a computer-controlled fuel injection system in May 2008, and is now the Napa Valley Wine Train's primary locomotive. Ferrocarril Central Andino in Peru, has run a CNG locomotive on a freight line since 2005. CNG locomotives are usually diesel–electric locomotives that have been converted to use compressed natural gas generators instead of diesel generators to generate the electricity that drives the traction motors. Some CNG locomotives are able to selectively fire their cylinders only when there is a demand for power, which, theoretically, gives them a higher fuel-efficiency than conventional diesel engines. CNG is also cheaper than petrol or diesel fuel.

=== Natural gas transport ===
CNG is used to transport natural gas by sea for intermediate distances, using CNG carrier ships, especially when the infrastructure for pipelines or LNG is not in place. At short distances, undersea pipelines are often more cost-effective, and for longer distances, LNG is often more cost-effective.

== Advantages ==
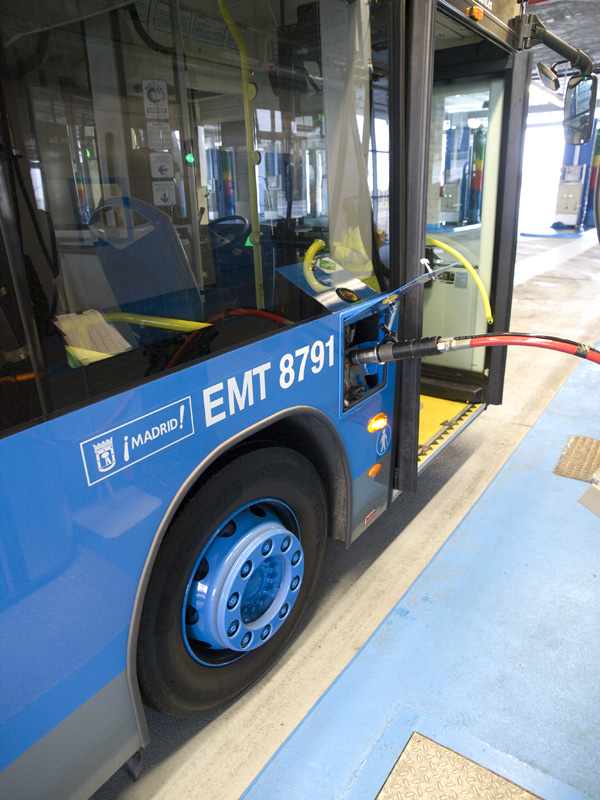
A CNG-powered bus being refueled in Madrid, Spain.

- Natural gas vehicles have lower maintenance costs than other hydrocarbon-fuel-powered vehicles.
- CNG fuel systems are sealed, preventing fuel losses from spills or evaporation.
- Increased life of lubricating oils, as CNG does not contaminate and dilute the crankcase oil.
- Being a gaseous fuel, CNG mixes easily and evenly in air.
- CNG is less likely to ignite on hot surfaces, since it has a high auto-ignition temperature (540 °C), and a narrow range (5–15 percent) of flammability.
- CNG-powered vehicles are considered to be safer than petrol-powered vehicles.
- Less pollution and more efficiency:
  - CNG emits significantly less pollution directly than petrol or oil when combusted (e.g., unburned hydrocarbons (UHC), carbon monoxide (CO), nitrogen oxides (NO_{X}), sulfur oxides (SO_{x}) and PM (particulate matter)). For example, an engine running on petrol for 100 km produces 22 kilograms of CO_{2}, while covering the same distance on CNG emits only 16.3 kilograms of CO_{2}.
  - The lifecycle greenhouse gas emissions for CNG compressed from California's pipeline natural gas is given a value of 67.70 grams of CO_{2}-equivalent per megajoule (gCO_{2}e/MJ) by CARB (the California Air Resources Board), approximately 28 percent lower than the average petrol fuel in that market (95.86 gCO_{2}e/MJ).
  - CNG produced from landfill biogas was found by CARB to have the lowest greenhouse gas emissions of any fuel analyzed, with a value of 11.26 gCO_{2}e/MJ (more than 88 percent lower than conventional petrol) in the low-carbon fuel standard that went into effect on January 12, 2010.
  - Due to lower carbon dioxide emissions, switching to CNG can help mitigate greenhouse gas emissions. However, natural gas leaks (both in the direct use and in the production and delivery of the fuel) represent an increase in greenhouse gas emissions. The ability of CNG to reduce greenhouse gas emissions over the entire fuel lifecycle will depend on the source of the natural gas and the fuel it is replacing.

== Drawbacks ==
Compressed natural gas vehicles require a greater amount of space for fuel storage than conventional petrol-powered vehicles. Since it is a compressed gas, rather than a liquid like petrol, CNG takes up more space for each GGE (gasoline gallon equivalent). However, the cylinders used to store the CNG take up space in the trunk of a car or bed of a pickup truck that has been modified to additionally run on CNG. This problem is solved in factory-built CNG vehicles that install the cylinders under the body of the vehicle, leaving the trunk free, e.g., Fiat Multipla, New Fiat Panda, Volkswagen Touran Ecofuel, Volkswagen Caddy Ecofuel, Chevy Taxi, which sold in countries such as Peru. Another option is installation on roof (typical on buses), but this could require structural modifications. In 2014, a test (by the Danish Technological Institute) of Euro6 heavy vehicles on CNG and diesel showed that CNG had higher fuel consumption, the same noise and production of CO_{2} and particulates, but NO_{X} emission was lower.

Leakage of unburned methane as natural gas is a significant issue because methane, the primary component of natural gas, is a powerful, short-lived greenhouse gas. It is more than 100 times more potent at trapping energy than carbon dioxide (CO_{2}), the principal contributor to man-made climate change.

== Comparison with other natural gas fuels ==
Compressed natural gas is often confused with LNG (liquefied natural gas). Both are stored forms of natural gas. The main difference is that CNG is stored at ambient temperature and high pressure, while LNG is stored at low temperature and nearly ambient pressure. In their respective storage conditions, LNG is a liquid and CNG is a supercritical fluid. CNG has a lower cost of production and storage compared to LNG as it does not require an expensive cooling process and cryogenic tanks. However, CNG requires a much larger volume to store the energy equivalent of petrol and the use of very high pressures (3000 to 4000 psi, or 205 to 275 bar). As a consequence of this, LNG is often used for transporting natural gas over large distances, in ships, trains or pipelines, where the gas is converted into CNG before distribution to the end user.

Natural gas is being experimentally stored at lower pressure in a form known as an ANG (adsorbed natural gas) cylinder, where it is adsorbed at 35 bar (500 psi, the pressure of gas in natural gas pipelines) in various sponge-like materials, such as carbon and MOFs (metal-organic frameworks). The fuel is stored at similar or greater energy density than CNG. This means that vehicles can be refueled from the natural gas network without extra gas compression, the fuel cylinders can be slimmed down and made of lighter, weaker materials.

It is possible to mix the ANG and CNG technology to reach an increased capacity of natural gas storage. In this process known as high pressure ANG, a high pressure CNG tank is filled by absorbers such as activated carbon (which is an adsorbent with high surface area) and stores natural gas by both CNG and ANG mechanisms.

Compressed natural gas is sometimes mixed with hydrogen (HCNG), which increases the H/C ratio (hydrogen/carbon ratio) of the fuel and gives it a flame speed up to eight times higher than CNG.

== Codes and standards ==
The lack of harmonized codes and standards across international jurisdictions is an additional barrier to NGV market penetration. The International Organization for Standardization has an active technical committee working on a standard for natural gas fuelling stations for vehicles.

Despite the lack of harmonized international codes, natural gas vehicles have an excellent global safety record. Existing international standards include ISO 14469-2:2007 which applies to CNG vehicle nozzles and receptacle and ISO 15500-9:2012 specifies tests and requirements for the pressure regulator.

The National Fire Protection Association's NFPA 52 code covers natural gas vehicle safety standards in the United States.

== Worldwide adoption ==
Top ten countries with the largest NGV vehicle fleets – 2013 (millions)
Rank	Country	Registered fleet	Rank	Country	Registered fleet
1	Iran	3.50	6	Italy	0.82
2	Pakistan	2.79	7	Colombia	0.46
3	Argentina	2.28	8	Uzbekistan	0.45
4	Brazil	1.75	9	Thailand	0.42
5	China	1.58	10	Indonesia	0.38
World Total = 18.09 million NGV vehicles

Iran, Pakistan, Argentina, Brazil and China have the highest number of CNG run vehicles in the world.

Natural gas vehicles are increasingly used in Iran, Pakistan, the Asia-Pacific region, the Indian capital of Delhi, and other large cities such as Ahmedabad, Mumbai, Pune, and Kolkata, as well as cities such as Lucknow, Kanpur, Varanasi, and others.

Its use is also increasing in South America, Europe, and North America, because of rising petrol prices.

=== Africa ===
Egypt is amongst the top 10 countries in CNG adoption, with 128,754 CNG vehicles and 124 CNG fueling stations. Egypt was also the first nation in Africa and the Middle East to open a public CNG fueling station in January 1996.

The vast majority (780,000) have been produced as dual fuel-vehicles by the auto manufacturer in the last two years, and the remainder have been converted utilizing after market conversion kits in workshops. There are 750 active refueling stations country wide with an additional 660 refueling stations under construction and expected to come on stream. Currently the major problem facing the industry as a whole is the building of refueling stations that is lagging behind dual fuel vehicle production, forcing many to use petrol instead.

Nigeria CNG started with a pilot project in Benin City Edo State in 2010 by NIPCO Gas Limited. NIPCO Gas Limited is a 100% subsidiary of NIPCO PLC. As of June 2020, seven CNG stations have been built in Benin City Edo State, with about 7,500 cars running on CNG in Benin City Edo state. In Benin City Edo state, major companies such as Coca-Cola, 7up, Yongxing Steel are using CNG to power their fork-lifts/trucks while Edo City Transport Ltd (ECTS) is also running some of its buses on CNG. Kwale, Nigeria CNG stations were inaugurated by Mr. Abhishek Sharma, the head of marketing (Natural Gas) from NIPCO Gas Limited in 2019.

=== Asia ===
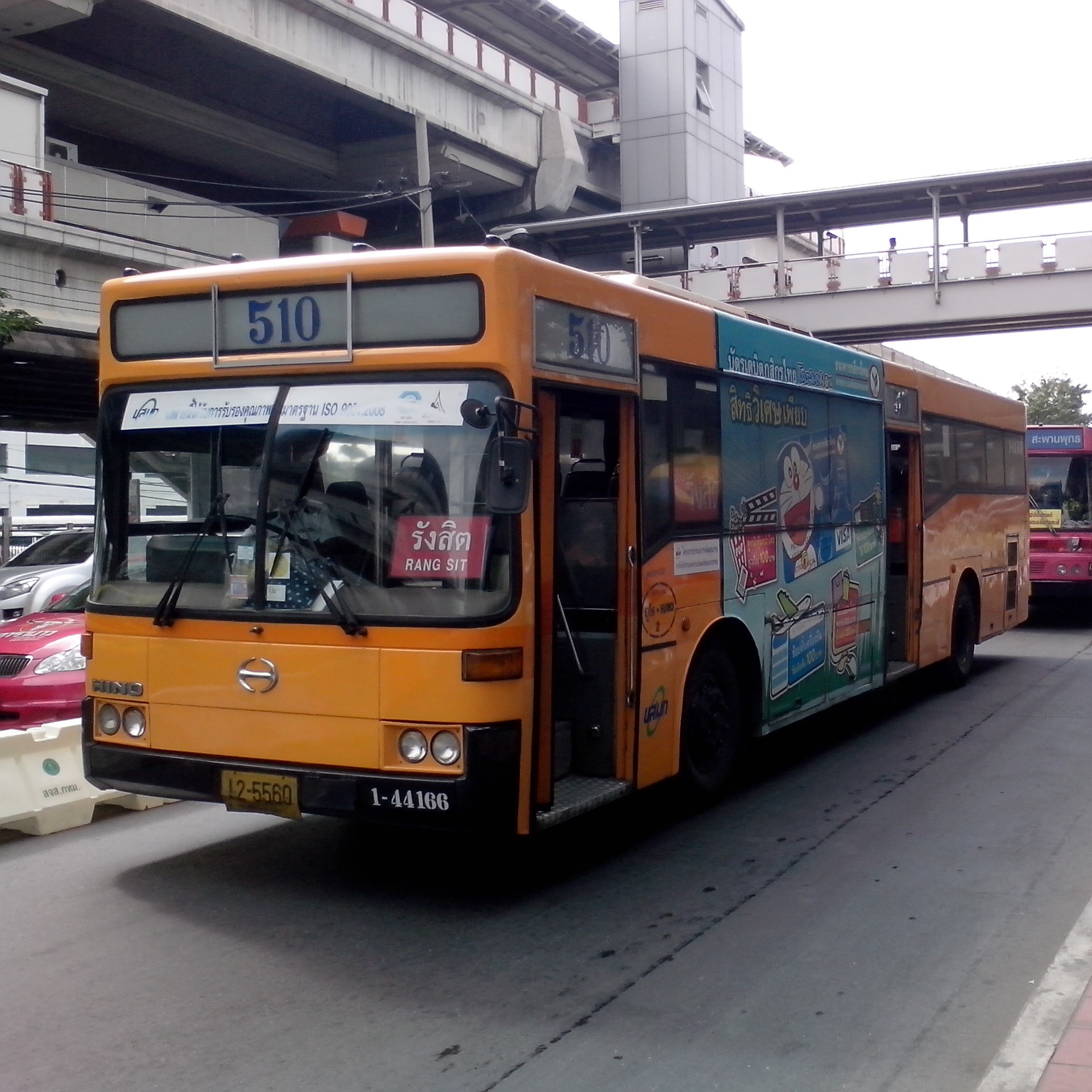
A CNG powered Hino bus, operated by BMTA in Thailand.

==== China ====
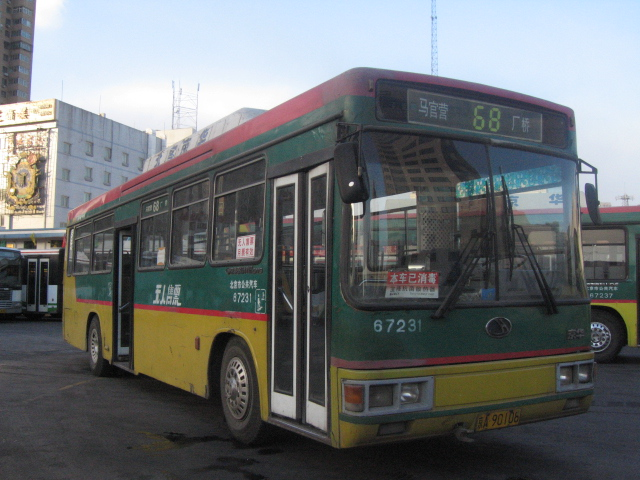
A CNG powered bus in Beijing. CNG buses in Beijing were introduced in late 1998.

In China, companies such as Sino-Energy are active in expanding the footprint of CNG filling stations in medium-size cities across the interior of the country, where at least two natural gas pipelines are operational.

==== Malaysia ====
In Malaysia, the use of CNG was originally introduced for taxicabs and airport limousines during the late 1990s, when new taxis were launched with CNG engines while taxicab operators were encouraged to send in existing taxis for full engine conversions. The practice of using CNG remained largely confined to taxicabs predominately in the Klang Valley and Penang due to a lack of interest. No incentives were offered for those besides taxicab owners to use CNG engines, while government subsidies on petrol and diesel made conventional road vehicles cheaper to use in the eyes of the consumers. Petronas, Malaysia's state-owned oil company, also monopolises the provision of CNG to road users. As of July 2008, Petronas only operates about 150 CNG refueling stations, most of which are concentrated in the Klang Valley. At the same time, another 50 were expected by the end of 2008.

As fuel subsidies were gradually removed in Malaysia starting June 5, 2008, the subsequent 41 percent price hike on petrol and diesel fuel led to a 500 percent increase in the number of new CNG cylinders installed. National car maker Proton considered fitting its Waja, Saga and Persona models with CNG kits from Prins Autogassystemen by the end of 2008, while a local distributor of locally assembled Hyundai cars offers new models with CNG kits. Conversion centres, which also benefited from the rush for lower running costs, also perform partial conversions to existing road vehicles, allowing them to run on both petrol or diesel and CNG with a cost varying between RM3,500 to RM5,000 for passenger cars.

==== Myanmar ====
The Ministry of Transport of Myanmar passed a law in 2005 which required that all public transport vehicles – buses, trucks and taxis, be converted to run on CNG. The Government permitted several private companies to handle the conversion of existing diesel and petrol cars, and also to begin importing CNG variants of buses and taxis. Accidents and rumours of accidents, partly fueled by Myanmar's position in local hydrocarbon politics, has discouraged citizens from using CNG vehicles, although now almost every taxi and public bus in Yangon, Myanmar's largest city, run on CNG. CNG stations have been set up around Yangon and other cities, but electricity shortages mean that vehicles may have to queue up for hours to fill their gas containers. The Burmese opposition movements are against the conversion to CNG, as they accuse the companies of being proxies of the junta, and also their desire that the petrodollars earned by the regime should go towards the defense sector rather than towards improving the infrastructure or welfare of the people.

==== India ====
In India, there are over 4500 CNG Stations all over the country now as compared to 2014 when the country only had about 900 CNG Stations. The government is aiming to increase the use of CNG powered vehicles by setting up more CNG stations in the country, the aim is to increase the current number to 8000 CNG Stations in the next two years.

As of December 2022, the state of Gujarat has the highest number of CNG Pumps in the country followed by Uttar Pradesh being the second highest and with Maharashtra falling little behind the above regions.

==== Pakistan ====
In Pakistan, the Karachi government under the order of the Supreme Court in 2004 made it mandatory for all city buses and auto rickshaws to run on CNG with the intention of reducing air pollution.

In 2012, the federal government announced plans to gradually phase out CNG over a period of approximately three years given natural gas shortages which have been negatively affecting the manufacturing sector. Aside from limiting electricity generation capacity, gas shortages in Pakistan have also raised the costs of business for key industries including the fertilizer, cement and textile sectors.

==== Singapore ====
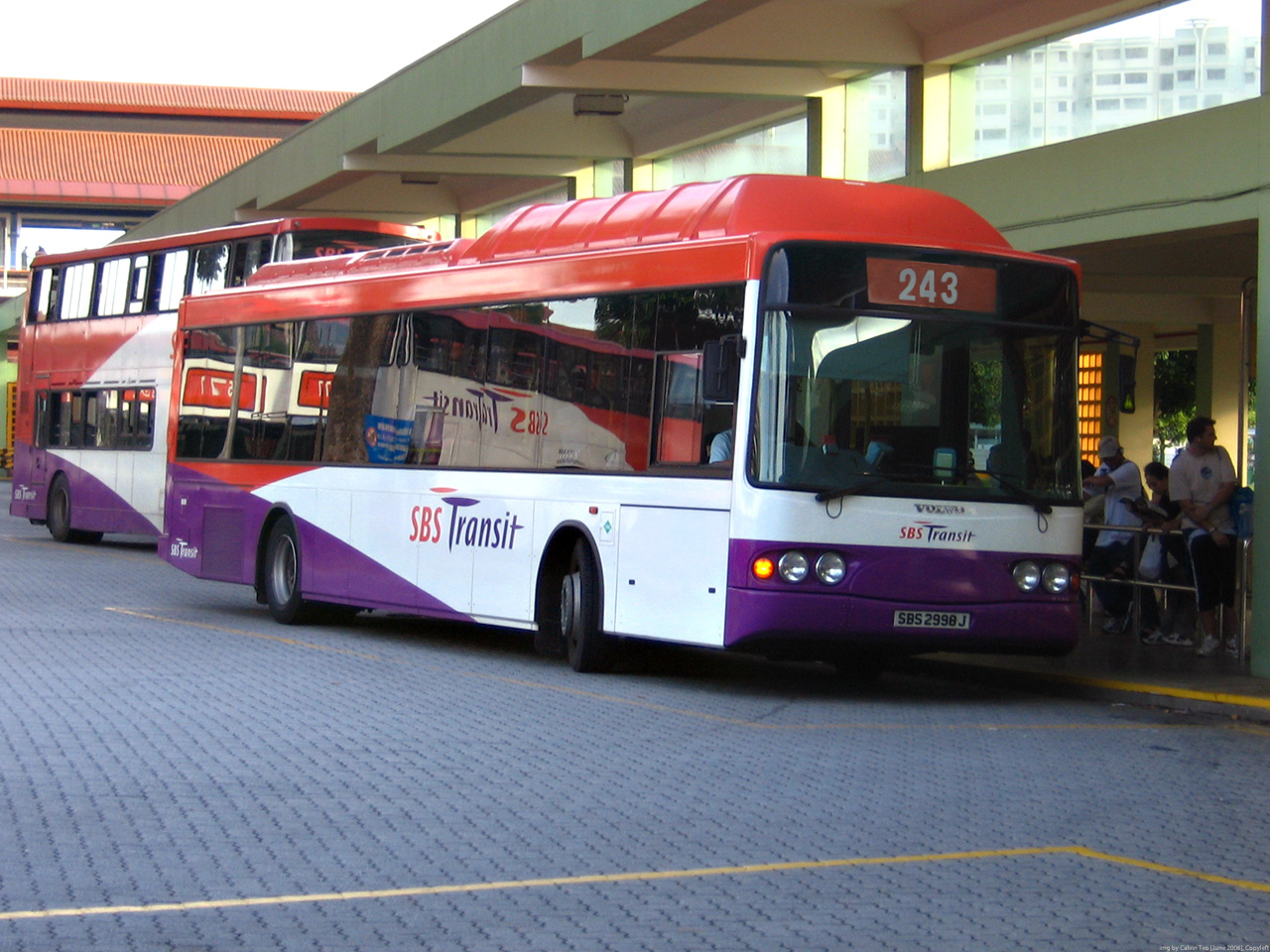
A retired CNG powered Volvo B10BLE bus, operated by SBS Transit in Singapore.

In Singapore, CNG was once used by public transport vehicles like buses and taxis, as well as goods vehicles until 2018. During its heyday in 2008 onwards, more owners of private cars had sought interest in converting their petrol-driven vehicles to also run on CNG – due to rising petrol prices. The initial cost of converting a regular vehicle to dual fuel at the German conversion workshop of C. Melchers, for example, is around S$3,800; with the promise of real cost-savings that dual-fuel vehicles bring over the long term.

Singapore currently has five operating filling stations for natural gas. Sembcorp Gas Pte Ltd. runs the station on Jurong Island and, jointly with Singapore Petroleum Company, the filling station at Jalan Buroh. Both these stations are in the western part of the country. Another station on the mainland is in Mandai Link to the north and is operated by SMART Energy. SMART also own a second station on Serangoon North Ave 5 which was set up end of March 2009; The fifth and largest station in the world, located in Toh Tuck, was opened by the UNION Group in September 2009. This station is recognized by the Guniness World Records as being the largest in the world with 46 refuelling hoses. The Union Group, which operates 1000 CNG Toyota Wish taxis then planned to introduce another three daughter stations and increase the CNG taxi fleet to 8000 units.

As a key incentive for using this eco-friendly fuel Singapore has a green vehicle rebate for users of CNG technology. First introduced in January 2001, the GVR grants a 40 percent discount on the OMV (open market value) cost of newly registered green passenger vehicles. This initiative will end at the end of 2012 as the government believes the 'critical mass' of CNG vehicles would then have been built up.

Due to reliability issues and lower ranges that CNG provided (as cited by users' feedback), refueling stations mostly concentrated in the western end of Singapore, the rising demand of greener solutions like hybrid technologies, led to its demise where both public buses and the last CNG taxis were on its way to being scrapped in 2018.

=== Europe ===
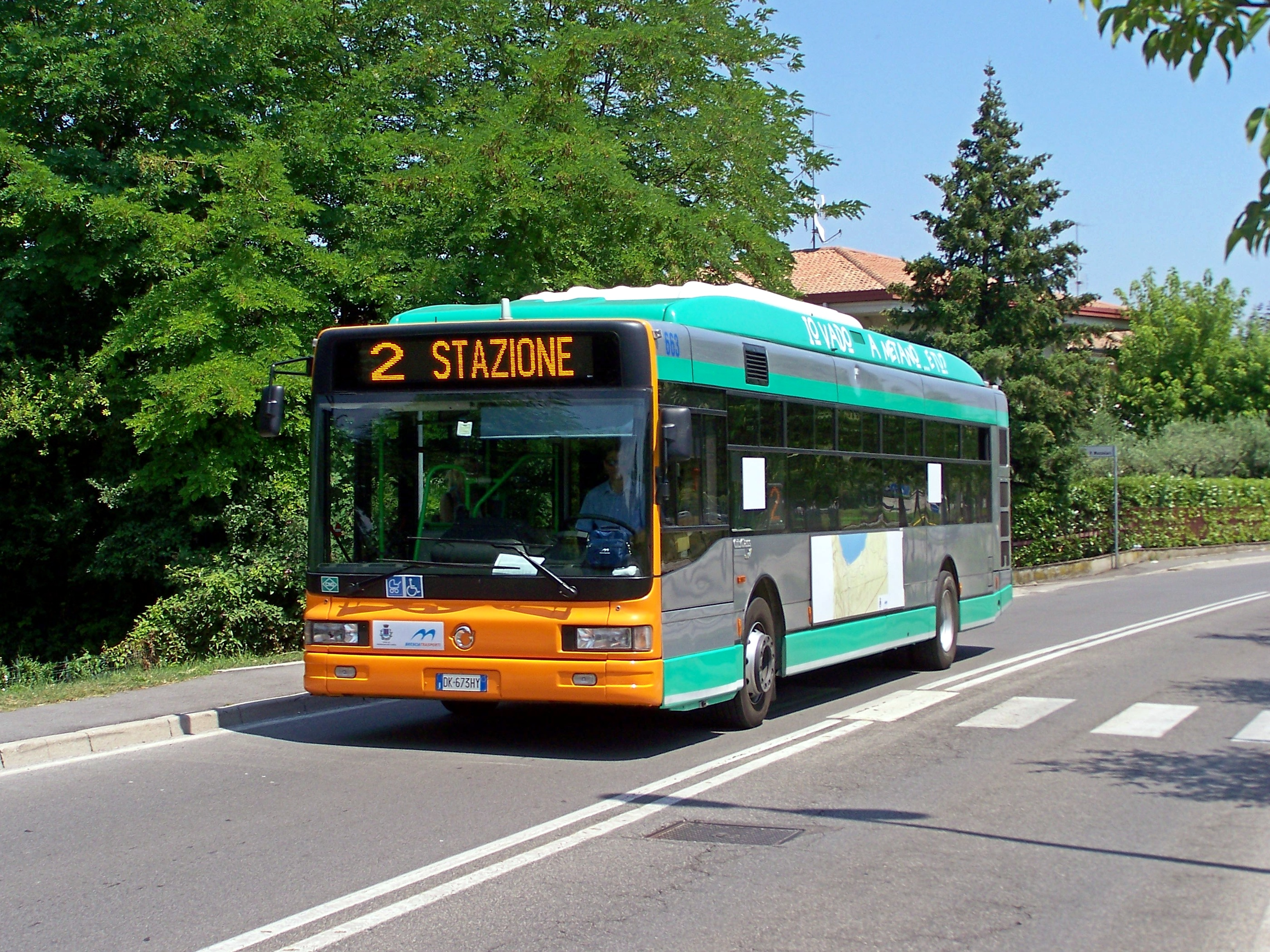
CNG powered bus in Italy

In Italy, there are more than 1173 CNG stations. The use of methane for vehicles, started in the 1930s and has continued off and on until today. Since 2008 there have been a large market expansion for natural gas vehicles (CNG and LPG) caused by the rise of petrol prices and by the need to reduce air pollution emissions. Before 1995 the only way to have a CNG-powered car was by having it retrofitted with an after-market kit. A large producer was Landi Renzo, Tartarini Auto, Prins Autogassystemen, OMVL, BiGAs,... and AeB for electronic parts used by the most part of kit producer. Landi Renzo and Tartarini selling vehicles in Asia and South America. After 1995 bi-fuel cars (petrol/CNG) became available from several major manufacturers. Currently Fiat, Opel, Volkswagen, Citroën, Renault, Volvo and Mercedes sell various car models and small trucks that are petrol/CNG powered. Usually CNG parts used by major car manufacturers are actually produced by automotive aftermarket kit manufacturers, e.g. Fiat use Tartarini Auto components, Volkswagen use Teleflex GFI and Landi Renzo components.

In Belgium, CNG is a very new fuel. At the beginning of 2014 there were only 17 refuelling stations, all of them in Flanders, but the number is now increasing rapidly. At the beginning of 2015 there were 29 refueling stations in Belgium, all of them in Flanders. As of January 2017, there are 76 active refueling stations in Belgium, most of them being in Flanders since only 7 of them are in Wallonia or Brussels. As a fuel and compared to petrol, CNG has an advantageous fiscal treatment with lower excises duties (although VAT is always paid). Since CNG, as a car fuel, is not totally exempted of excise duties, CNG cars do not pay a prime road tax to partially compensate the State for the loss of revenue. Instead LPG cars pay a prime road tax in Belgium, because LPG is totally exempted from excise duties. Since CNG is not totally exempted of excise duties, in Belgium it is allowed to connect a car to the home network of natural gas and to refuel the car from home. The purchase of CNG cars is not subsidised by the government, but by the Belgian producers and distributors of natural gas. Fiat and Volkswagen sell factory-equipped CNG-cars in Belgium. At the end of 2018 there were 11,188 vehicles running with CNG in Belgium.

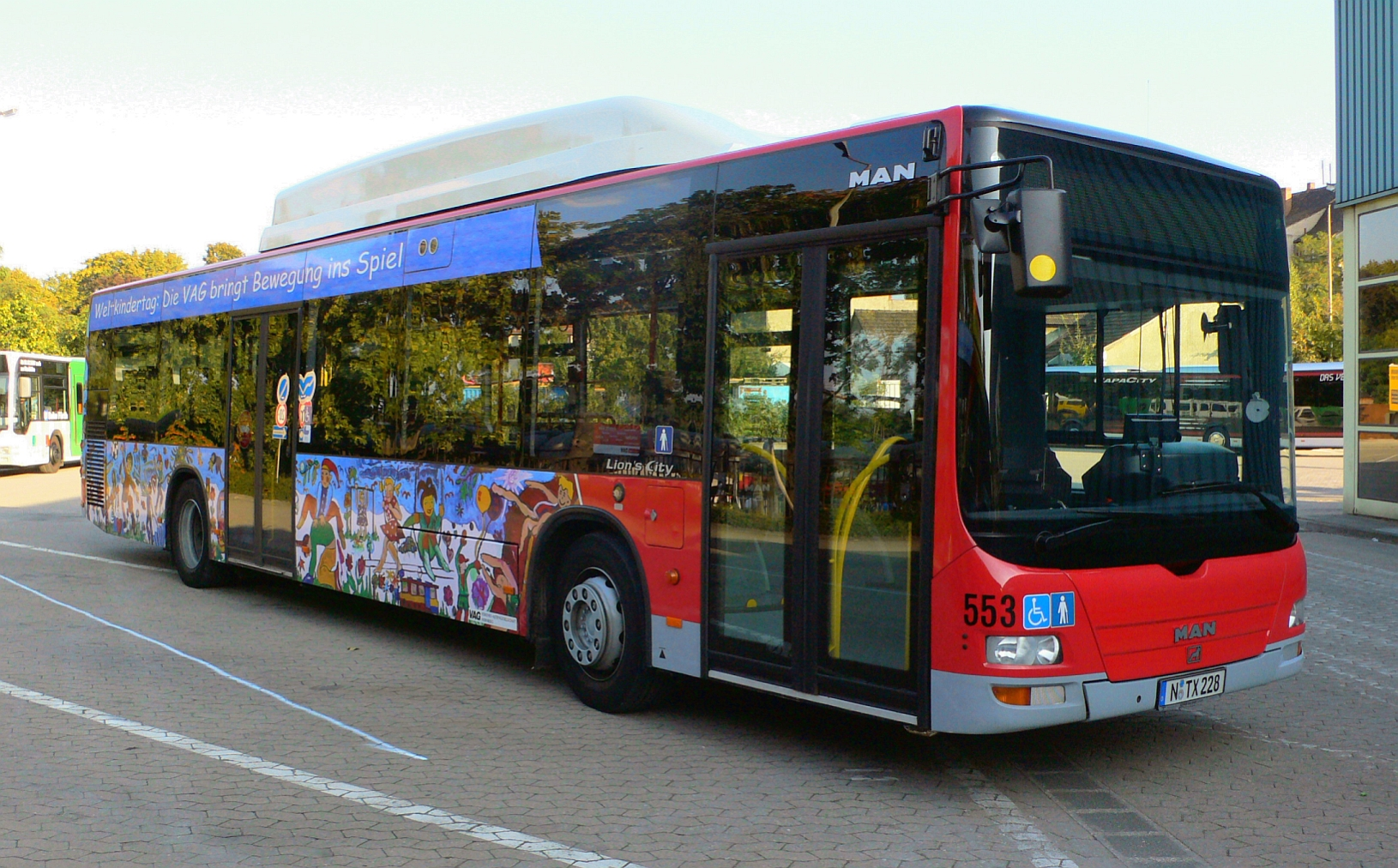
CNG powered bus in Germany

In Germany, CNG-generated vehicles are expected to increase to two million units of motor-transport by 2020. The cost for CNG fuel is between 1/3 and 1/2 compared to other fossil fuels in Europe. In 2016 there are around 900 CNG stations in Germany and major German car manufacturers like Volkswagen, Mercedes, Opel, Audi offer CNG engines on most of their models. Augsburg is one of the few cities that only run CNG operated public buses since 2011.

In Turkey, Ankara municipality is increasingly using CNG buses, where numbers have reached 1090 by 2011. Istanbul has started in 2014 with an order of 110 buses. Konya also added 60 buses to its fleet the same year.

In Portugal, there are 9 CNG refueling stations as of September 25, 2017.

In Hungary, there are four public CNG refueling stations in the cities Budapest, Szeged, Pécs and Győr. The public transportation company of Szeged, Szolnok and some districts in Budapest runs buses mainly on CNG.

In Bulgaria, there are 96 CNG refueling stations as of July 2011. One can be found in most of Bulgaria's big towns. In the capital Sofia there are 22 CNG stations making it possibly the city with the most publicly available CNG stations in Europe. There are also quite a few in Plovdiv, Ruse, Stara Zagora and Veliko Tarnovo as well as in the towns on the Black Sea – Varna, Burgas, Nesebar and Kavarna. CNG vehicles are becoming more and more popular in the country. The fuel is mostly used by taxi drivers because of its much lower price compared to petrol. Currently (as of July, 2015) the city of Sofia is rapidly renewing its public transport fleet with MAN Lion's City buses running on CNG. Also, many companies switch to CNG cargo vans and even heavy trucks for their daily operations within city limits.

In North Macedonia, there is one CNG station located in the capital Skopje, but it is not for public use. Only twenty buses of the local Public Transport Company have been fitted to use a mixture of diesel and CNG. The first commercial CNG station in Skopje is in the advanced stage of development and was expected to start operation in July 2011.

In Serbia, there are about 20 public CNG refuelling stations as of August 2019. Four in the capital Belgrade, and the rest in the towns of Subotica (1), Novi Sad (1), Zrenjanin (1), Pancevo (2), Kruševac (1), Kragujevac (1), Cacak (2), and so on. Detailed list is currently available on CNGEurope Web site.

In Slovenia, there are four public CNG refuelling stations as of December 2018. Two in the capital Ljubljana, and one each in Maribor and Jesenice. Additionally, at least 14 new refuelling stations are planned in all city municipalities by the end of 2020. Ljubljana Passenger Transport operates 66 CNG fuelled city buses, as of May 2016. Its Maribor counterpart, Marprom has 19 CNG city buses in their fleet, as of October 2018.

In Croatia, there are two public CNG refuelling stations situated close to the center of Zagreb and in Rijeka. At least 60 CNG buses are in use as a form of a public transport (Zagreb public transport services).

In Estonia, there are 11 public CNG refuelling stations – four in the country's capital Tallinn, and one each in Tartu, Pärnu, Viljandi, Rakvere, Jõhvi, and Narva. From 2011 on, Tartu has five Scania-manufactured CNG buses operating its inner-city routes.

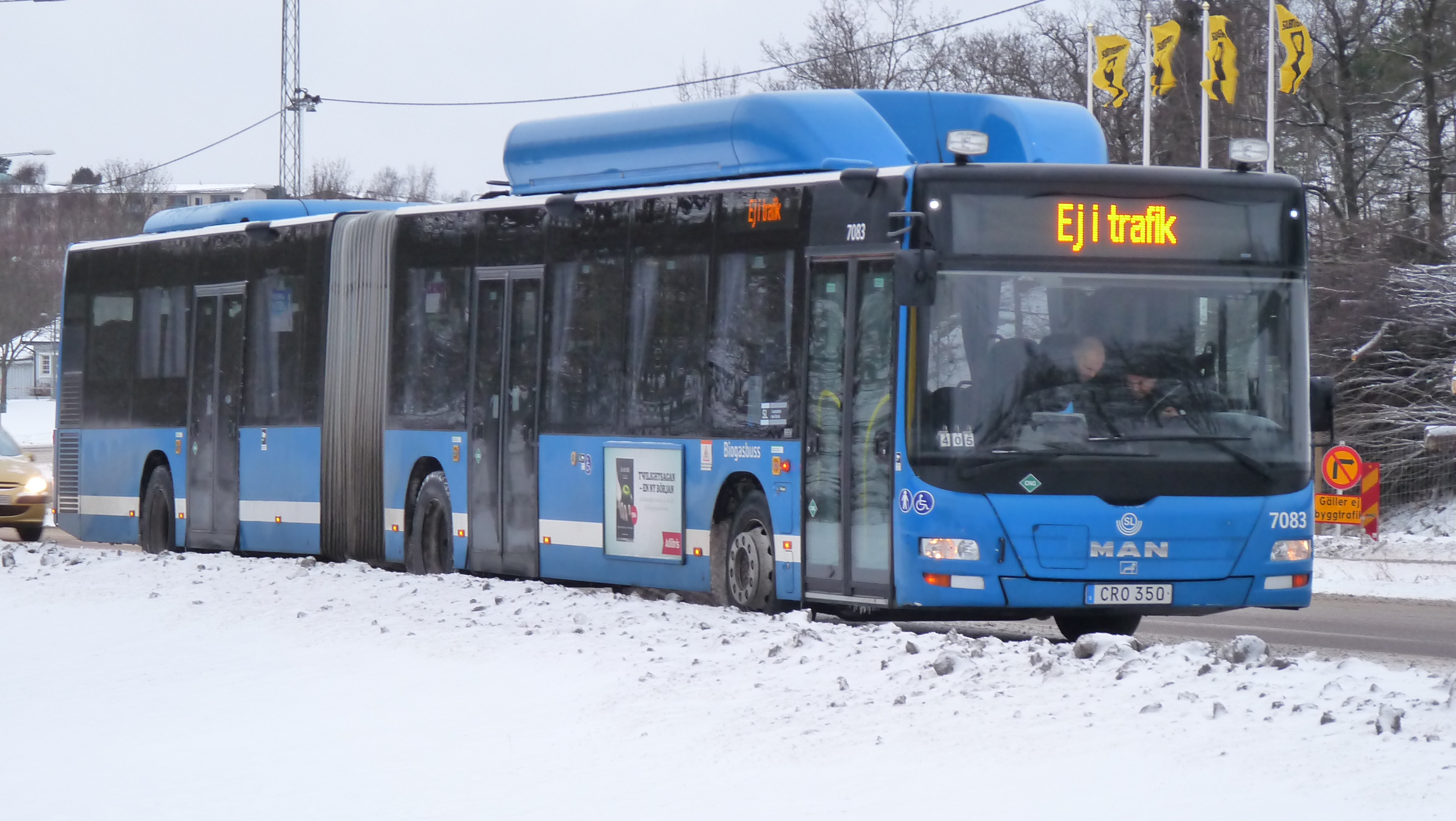
CNG powered bus in Sweden

In Sweden, there are currently 90 CNG filling stations available to the public (as compared to about 10 LPG filling stations), primarily located in the southern and western parts of the country as well the Mälardalen region Another 70–80 CNG filling stations are under construction or in a late stage of planning (completions 2009–2010). Several of the planned filling stations are located in the northern parts of the country, which will greatly improve the infrastructure for CNG car users. There are approx. 14,500 CNG vehicles in Sweden (2007), of which approx. 13,500 are passenger cars and the remainder includes buses and trucks. In Stockholm, the public transportation company SL currently operates 50 CNG buses but have a capacity to operate 500. The Swedish government recently prolonged its subsidies for the development of CNG filling stations, from 2009 to 2012–31 to 2010-12-31.

In Spain, CNG is a very new fuel and the refueling network is being developed. In Madrid, the EMT, uses 1915 buses running with CNG. At the beginning of 2015 there were 35 CNG refueling stations in Spain. Several car brands sell brand-new cars running with CNG, including Fiat, Volkswagen, Seat and Skoda among others.

As of 2013, there are 47 public CNG filling stations in the Czech Republic, mainly in the big cities. Local bus manufacturers SOR Libchavy and Tedom produce CNG versions of their vehicles, with roof-mounted cylinders.

=== Middle East ===
==== Iran ====
Iran has one of the largest fleets of CNG vehicles and CNG distribution networks in the world. There are 2335 CNG fueling stations, with a total of 13,534 CNG nozzles. The number of CNG burning vehicles in Iran exceeds 3.5 million. CNG consumption by Iran's transportation sector is around 20 million cubic meters per day.

=== North America ===
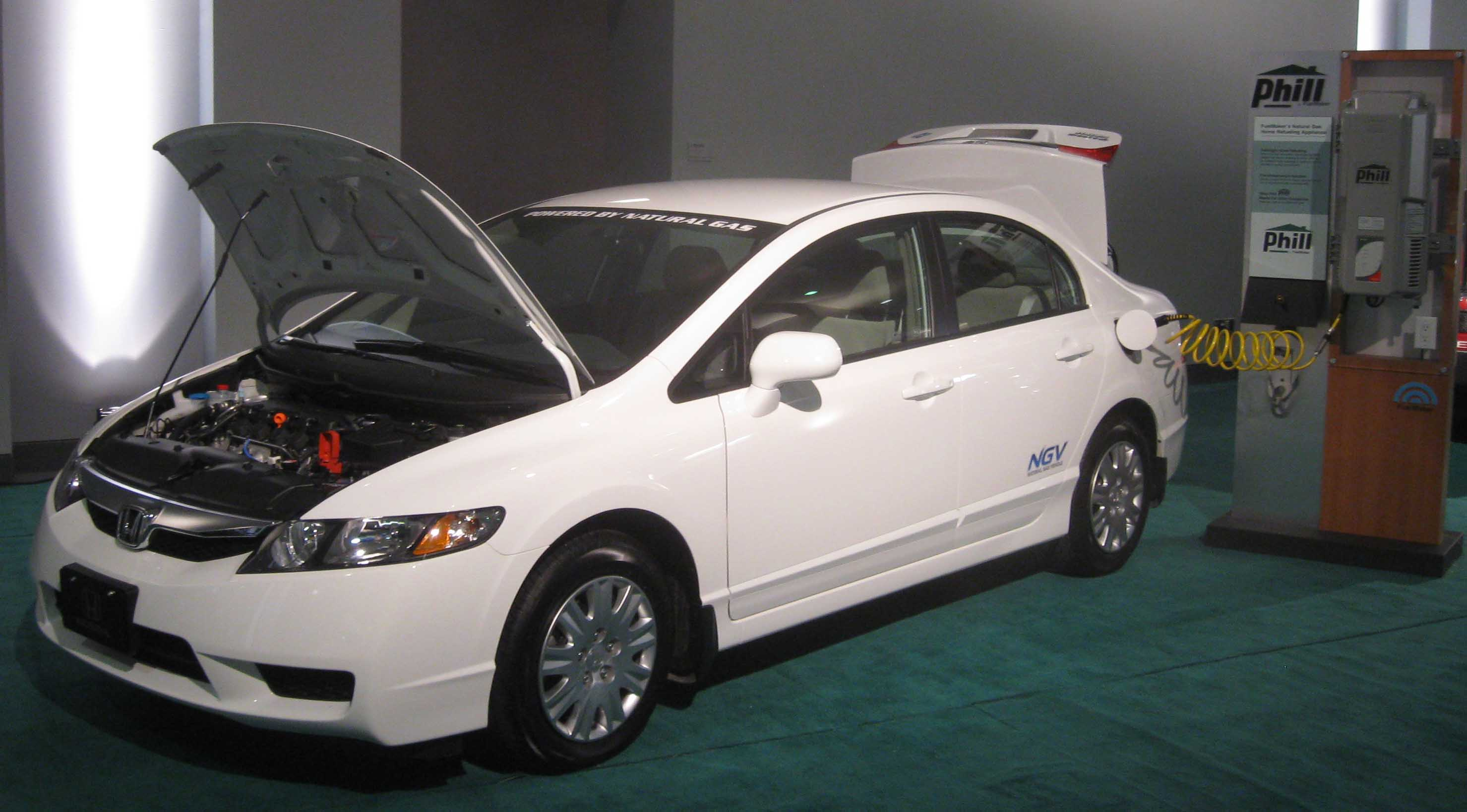
The Honda Civic GX is factory-built to run on CNG and it is available in several U.S. regional markets.

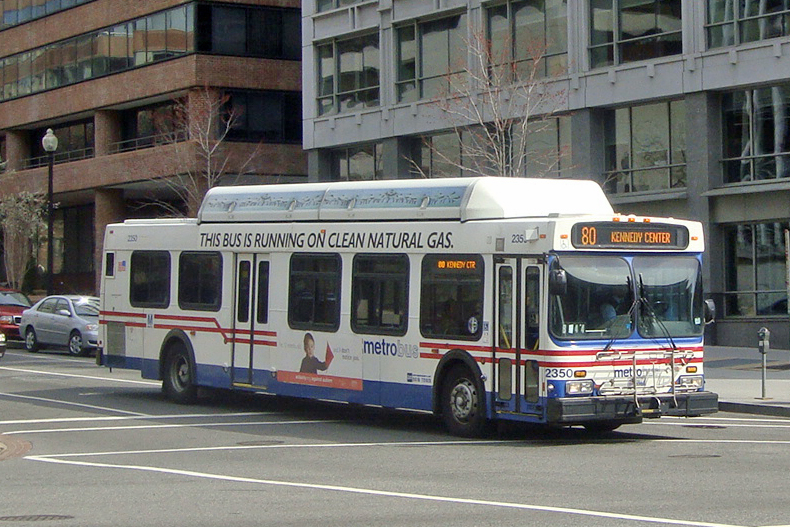
Buses powered with CNG are common in the United States such as the New Flyer Industries C40LF bus in Washington, D.C. shown here.

==== Canada ====
Natural gas has been used as a motor fuel in Canada for over 20 years. With assistance from federal and provincial research programs, demonstration projects and NGV market deployment programs during the 1980s and 1990s, the population of light-duty NGVs grew to over 35,000 by the early 1990s. This assistance resulted in a significant adoption of natural gas transit buses as well.

The NGV market started to decline after 1995, eventually reaching today's vehicle population of about 12,000.

This figure includes 150 urban transit buses, 45 school buses, 9,450 light-duty cars and trucks, and 2,400 forklifts and ice-resurfacers. The total fuel use in all NGV markets in Canada was 1.9 PJs (petajoules) in 2007 (or 54.6 million liters of petrol liters equivalent), down from 2.6 PJs in 1997. Public CNG refueling stations have declined in quantity from 134 in 1997 to 72 today. There are 22 in British Columbia, 12 in Alberta, 10 in Saskatchewan, 27 in Ontario and two in Québec. There are only 12 private fleet stations.

Canadian industry has developed CNG-fueled truck and bus engines, CNG-fueled transit buses, and light trucks and taxis.

Fuelmaker Corporation of Toronto, the Honda-owned manufacturer of CNG auto refueling units, was forced into bankruptcy by parent Honda USA for an unspecified reason in 2009. The various assets of Fuelmaker were subsequently acquired by Fuel Systems Corporation of Santa Ana, California.

==== United States ====
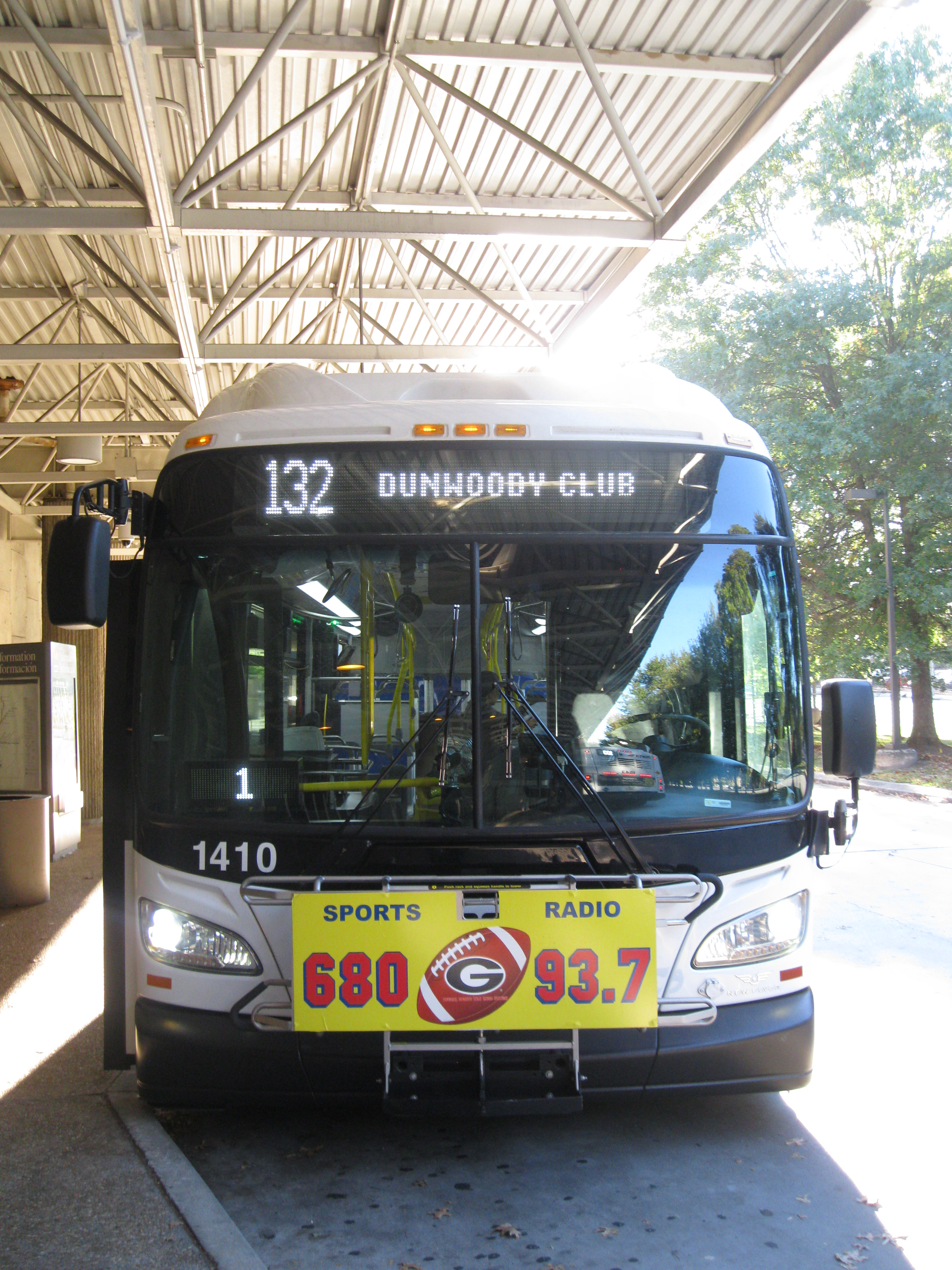
This MARTA bus is a New Flyer XN40 which runs on CNG. 70% of MARTA's bus fleet is CNG.

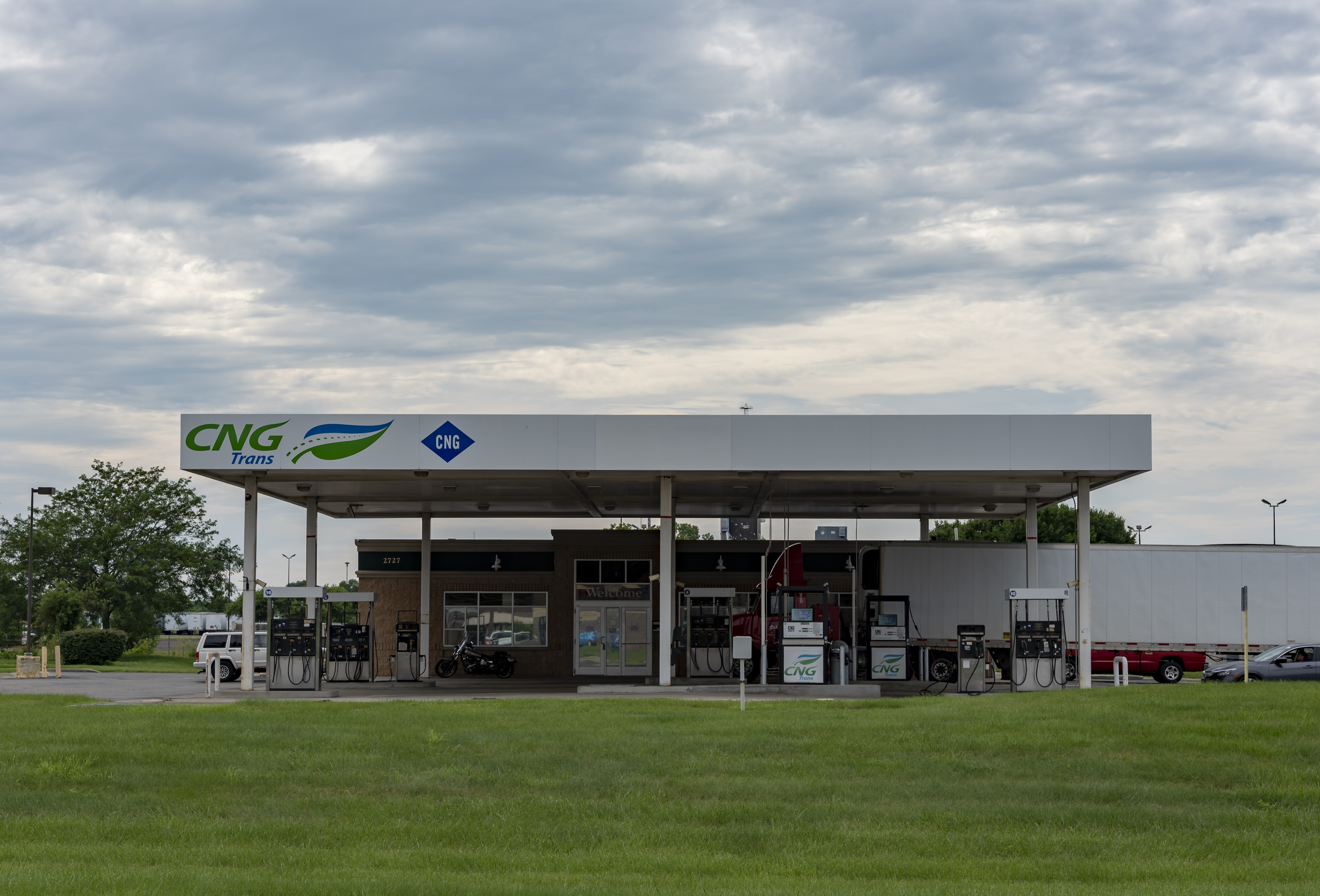
CNG Fueling Station in Columbus, Ohio

Similar to Canada, the United States has implemented various NGV initiatives and programs since 1980, but has had limited success in sustaining the market. There were 105,000 NGVs in operation in 2000; this figure peaked at 121,000 in 2004, and decreased to 110,000 in 2009.

In the United States, federal tax credits are available for buying a new CNG vehicle. Use of CNG varies from state to state; only 34 states have at least one CNG fueling site.

In Texas, Railroad Commissioner David Porter launched his Texas Natural Gas Initiative in October 2013 to encourage the adoption of natural gas fuel in the transportation and exploration and production sectors. As of 2015 Texas is rapidly becoming a leader in natural gas infrastructure in the US with 137 natural gas fueling stations (private and public). Nine months into FY2015 Commissioner Porter reports Texas CNG, LNG Sales Show 78 Percent Increase Over FY 2014 year to date. Per Commissioner Porter in June 2015: "Natural gas vehicles are becoming mainstream faster than expected. These collections are nearly double the amount collected last year at this time. At 15 cents per gallon equivalent, $3,033,600 of motor fuel tax equates to the sale of 20,224,000 gallon equivalents of natural gas." The $3 million in Texas natural gas tax receipts is for both CNG and LNG for FY2015 through the May 2015. The Texas fiscal year starts Sept 1 so 9 months tax collections are represented.

In Athens, Ala., the city and its Gas Department installed a public CNG station on the Interstate 65 Corridor, making it the only public CNG station between Birmingham and Nashville as of February 2014. The city's larger fleet vehicles such as garbage trucks also use this public station for fueling. The city also has two slow-fill non-public CNG stations for its fleet. Athens has added CNG/petrol Tahoes for police and fire, a CNG Honda Civic, CNG Heil garbage trucks, and CNG/petrol Dodge pickup trucks to its fleet.

In California, CNG is used extensively in local city and county fleets, as well as public transportation (city/school buses). There are 90 public fueling stations in southern California alone, and travel from San Diego so the Bay Area to Las Vegas and Utah is routine with the advent of online station maps such as www.cngprices.com. Compressed natural gas is typically available for 30-60 percent less than the cost of petrol in much of California.

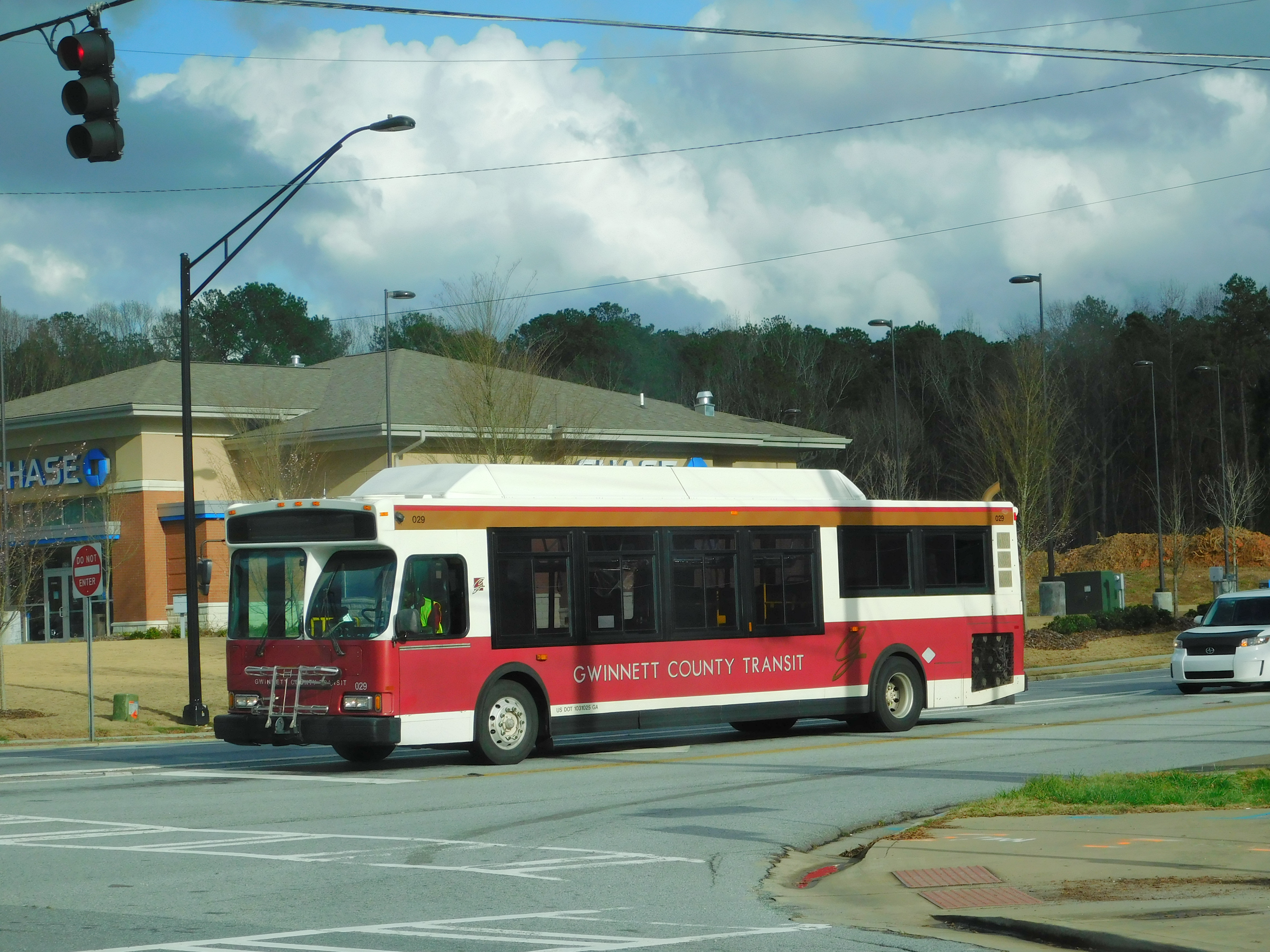
Ride Gwinnett Orion VII CNG 029 on the 35 Bus on Peachtree Corners.

The 28 buses running the Ride Gwinnett local routes run on 100 percent CNG. Additionally, about half of the Georgia Regional Transportation Authority express fleet, which runs and refuels out of the Ride Gwinnett facility, uses CNG.

The Massachusetts Bay Transportation Authority was running 360 CNG buses as early as in 2007, and is the largest user in the state.

The Metropolitan Transportation Authority (MTA) of New York City currently has over 900 buses powered by compressed natural gas, with CNG bus depots located in Brooklyn, The Bronx, and Queens.

The Nassau Inter-County Express (or NICE Bus, formerly New York MTA Long Island Bus) runs a 100% Orion CNG-fueled bus fleet for fixed-route service, consisting of 360 buses for service in Nassau County, parts of Queens, New York, and the western sections of Suffolk County.

The City of Harrisburg, Arkansas has switched some of the city's vehicles to compressed natural gas in an effort to save money on fuel costs. Trucks used by the city's street and water, sewer, and gas departments have been converted from petrol to CNG.

Personal use of CNG is currently a small niche market, though with current tax incentives and a growing number of public fueling stations available, it is experiencing unprecedented growth. The state of Utah offers a subsidised statewide network of CNG filling stations at a rate of $1.57/gge, while petrol is above $4.00/gal.

Elsewhere in the nation, retail prices average around $2.50/gge, with home refueling units compressing gas from residential gas lines for under $1/gge. Other than aftermarket conversions, and government used vehicle auctions, the only currently produced CNG vehicle in the United States is the Honda Civic GX sedan, which is made in limited numbers and available only in states with retail fueling outlets.

An initiative, known as Pickens Plan, calls for the expansion of the use of CNG as a standard fuel for heavy vehicles has been recently started by oilman and entrepreneur T. Boone Pickens. California voters defeated Proposition 10 in the 2008 General Election by a significant (59.8 percent to 40.2 percent) margin. Proposition 10 was a $5 billion bond measure that, among other things, would have given rebates to state residents that purchase CNG vehicles.

On February 21, 2013, T. Boone Pickens and New York Mayor, Michael Bloomberg unveiled a CNG powered mobile pizzeria. The company, Neapolitan Express uses alternative energy to run the truck as well as 100 percent recycled and compostable materials for their carryout boxes.

Congress has encouraged conversion of cars to CNG with a tax credits of up to 50 percent of the auto conversion cost and the CNG home filling station cost. However, while CNG is much cleaner fuel, the conversion requires a type certificate from the EPA. Meeting the requirements of a type certificate can cost up to $50,000. Other non-EPA approved kits are available. A complete and safe aftermarket conversion using a non-EPA approved kit can be achieved for as little as $400 without the cylinder.

===== Deployments =====
AT&T ordered 1,200 CNG-powered cargo vans from General Motors in 2012. It is the largest-ever order of CNG vehicles from General Motors to date. AT&T has announced its intention to invest up to $565 million to deploy approximately 15,000 alternative fuel vehicles over a 10-year period through 2018, will use the vans to provide and maintain communications, high-speed Internet and television services for AT&T customers.

=== South America ===
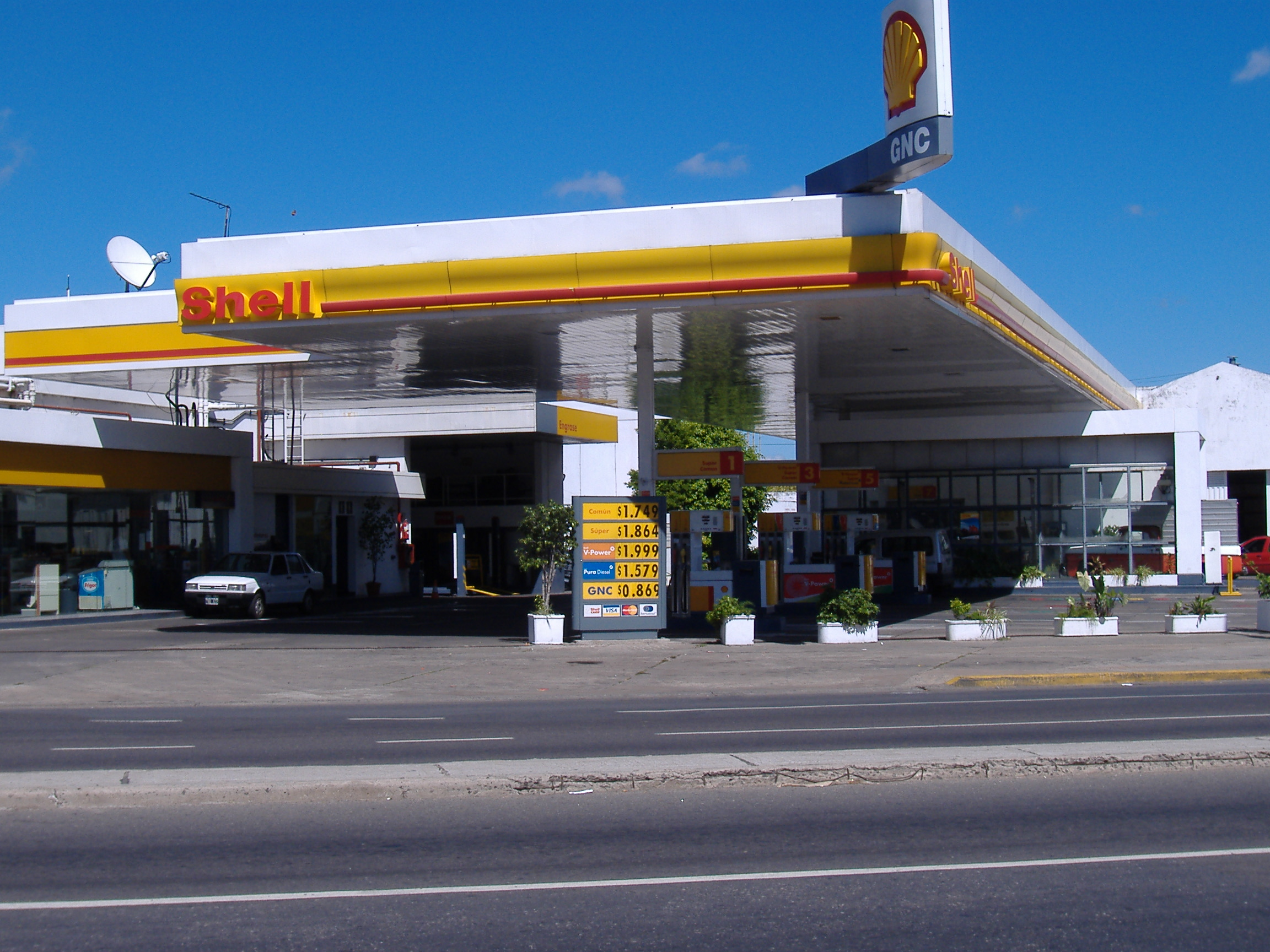
CNG station in Rosario, Argentina.

CNG vehicles are commonly used in South America, where these vehicles are mainly used as taxicabs in main cities of Argentina and Brazil. Normally, standard petrol vehicles are retrofitted in specialized shops, which involve installing the gas cylinder in the trunk and the CNG injection system and electronics. Argentina and Brazil are the two countries with the largest fleets of CNG vehicles, with a combined total fleet of more than 3.4 million vehicles by 2009. Conversion has been facilitated by a substantial price differential with liquid fuels, locally produced conversion equipment and a growing CNG-delivery infrastructure.

As of 2009 Argentina had 1,807,186 NGV's with 1,851 refueling stations across the nation, or 15 percent of all vehicles; and Brazil had 1,632,101 vehicles and 1,704 refueling stations, with a higher concentration in the cities of Rio de Janeiro and São Paulo.

Colombia had an NGV fleet of 300,000 vehicles, and 460 refueling stations, as of 2009. Bolivia has increased its fleet from 10,000 in 2003 to 121,908 units in 2009, with 128 refueling stations. Peru had 81,024 NGVs and 94 fueling stations as 2009, but that number is expected to skyrocket as Peru sits on South America's largest gas reserves. In Peru several factory-built NGVs have the cylinders installed under the body of the vehicle, leaving the trunk free. Among the models built with this feature are the Fiat Multipla, the new Fiat Panda, the Volkswagen Touran Ecofuel, the Volkswagen Caddy Ecofuel and the Chevy Taxi. Other countries with significant NGV fleets are Venezuela (15,000) and Chile (8,064) as of 2009.

=== Oceania ===
During the 1970s and 1980s, CNG was commonly used in New Zealand in the wake of the oil crises, but fell into decline after petrol prices receded. At the peak of natural gas use, 10 percent of New Zealand's cars were converted, around 110,000 vehicles.

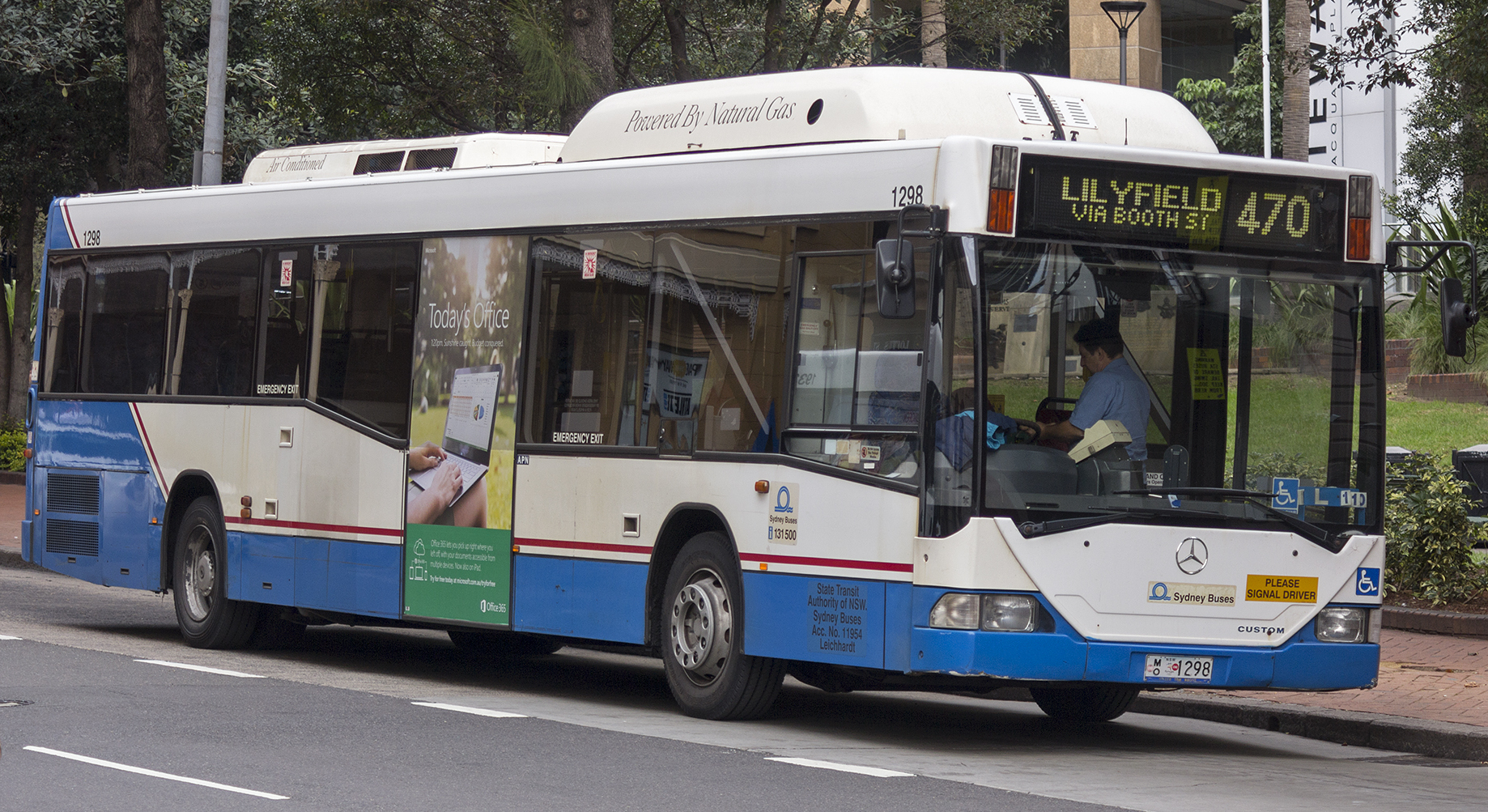
A Custom Coaches bodied Mercedes-Benz O405NH running on CNG, operated by Sydney Buses in Australia

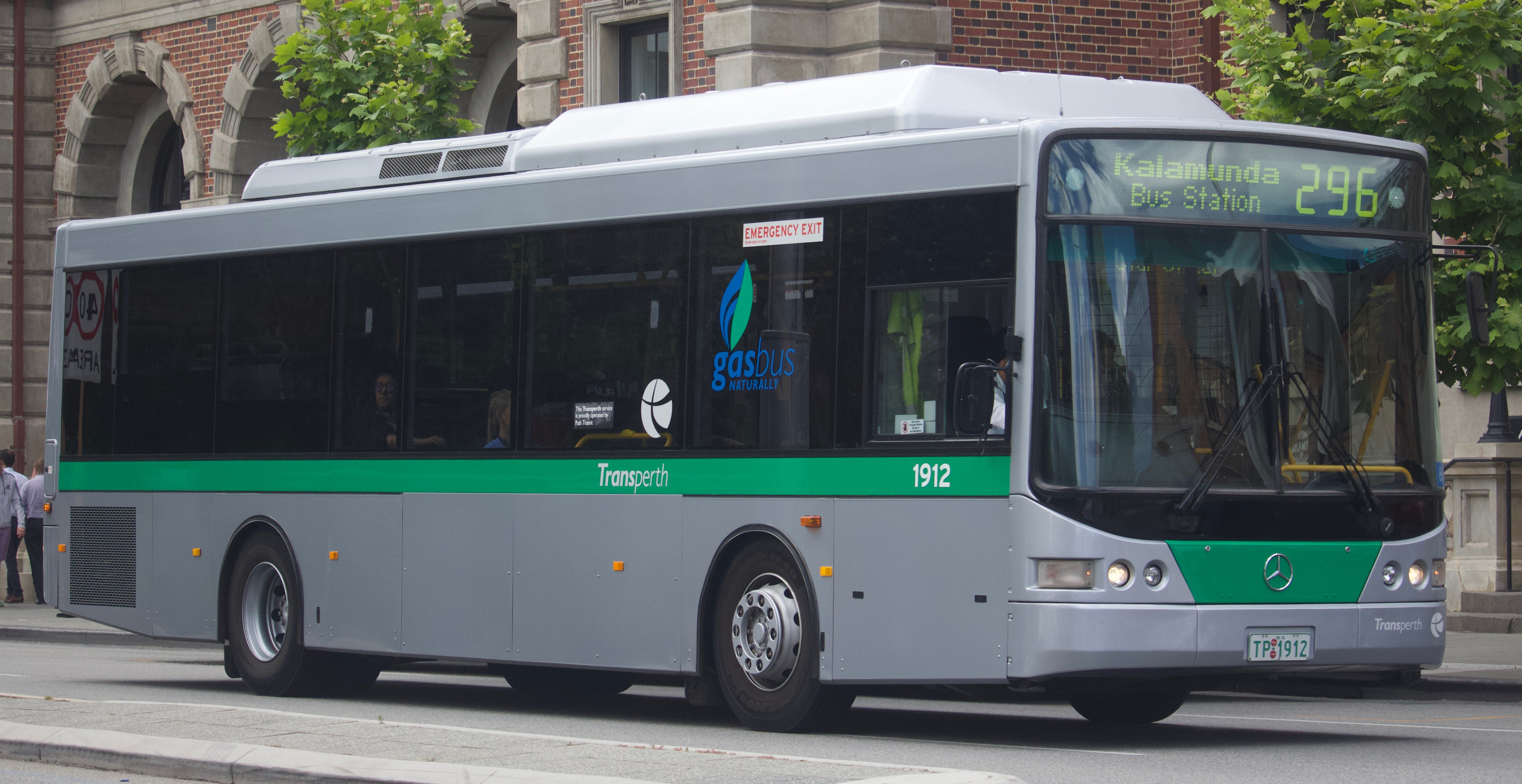
Transperth Mercedes-Benz OC500LE running on CNG

For a period of time, Brisbane Transport in Queensland, Australia adopted a policy of purchasing only CNG buses. Brisbane Transport has 215 Scania L94UB and 324 MAN 18.310 models as well as 30 MAN NG 313 articulated CNG buses. The State Transit Authority purchased 100 Scania L113CRB, 283 Mercedes-Benz O405NH and 254 Euro 5-compliant Mercedes-Benz OC500LE buses.

In the 1990s, Benders Busways of Geelong, Victoria trialled CNG buses for the Energy Research and Development Corporation.

Martin Ferguson, Ollie Clark and Noel Childs featured on The 7:30 Report raised the issue of CNG as an overlooked transport fuel option in Australia, highlighting the large volumes of LNG currently being exported from the North West Shelf in light of the cost of importing crude oil to Australia.
