= Sinoenergy =

Chinese natural gas company

Sinoenergy Corporation is a manufacturer of compressed natural gas (CNG), vehicle and gas station equipment as well as an operator of CNG stations in China. The company also manufactures a wide variety of pressure containers used in the petroleum and chemical, metallurgy, electricity generation and food and brewery industries. Sinoenergy was founded in July 2004 and is based in Qingdao, Shandong, China.
