= Cycling in Toronto =

Transport by bicycle in Toronto, Ontario, Canada

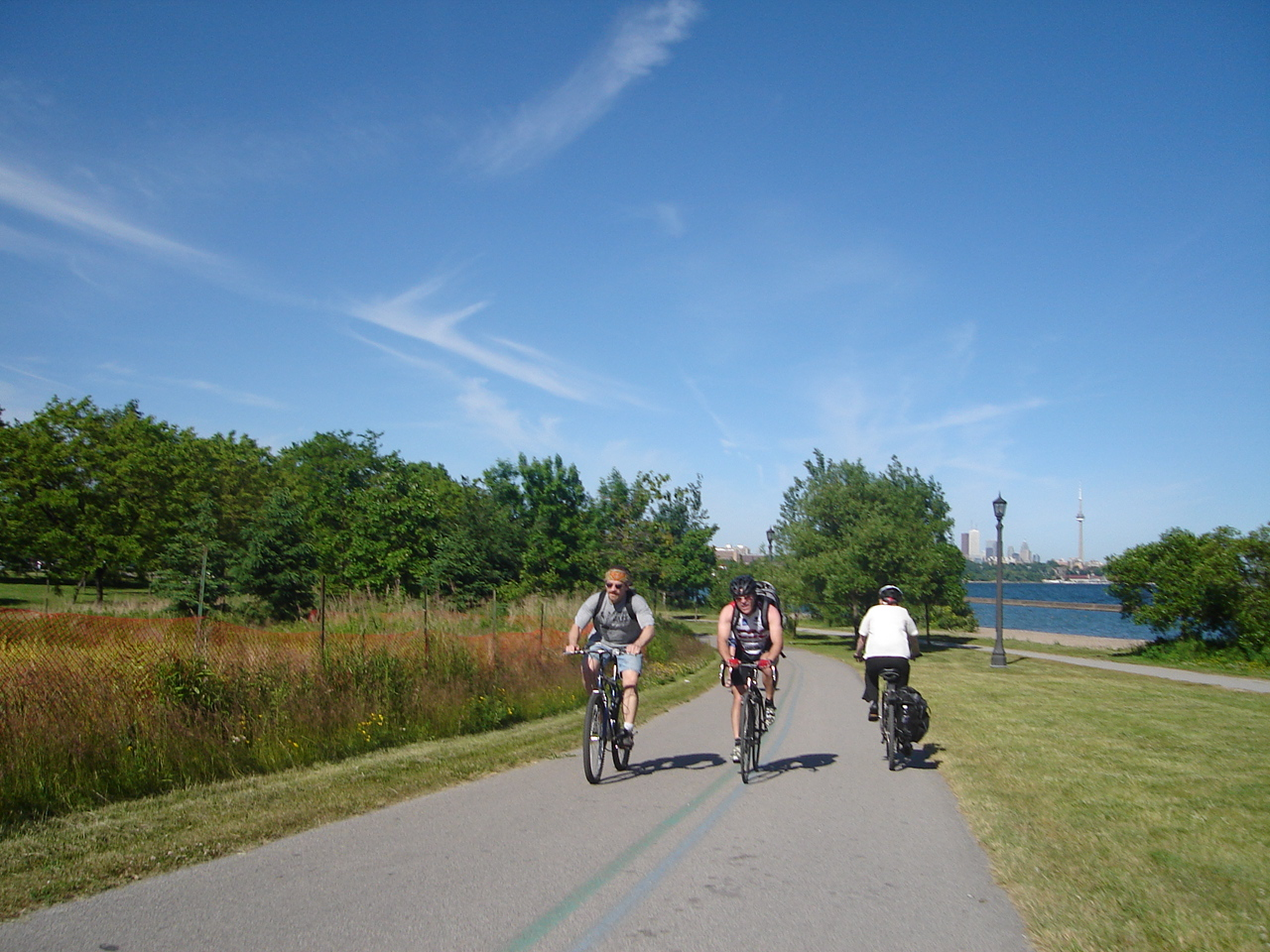
Cyclists at Toronto's Martin Goodman Trail, a mixed-use trail for cyclists and pedestrians.

Toronto, Ontario, like many North American cities, has slowly been expanding its purpose-built cycling infrastructure. The number of cyclists in Toronto has been increasing progressively, particularly in the city's downtown core. As cycling conditions improve, a cycling culture has grown and alternatives such as automobiles are seen as less attractive. The politics of providing resources for cyclists, particularly dedicated bike lanes, has been contentious, particularly since the 2010s.

== History ==
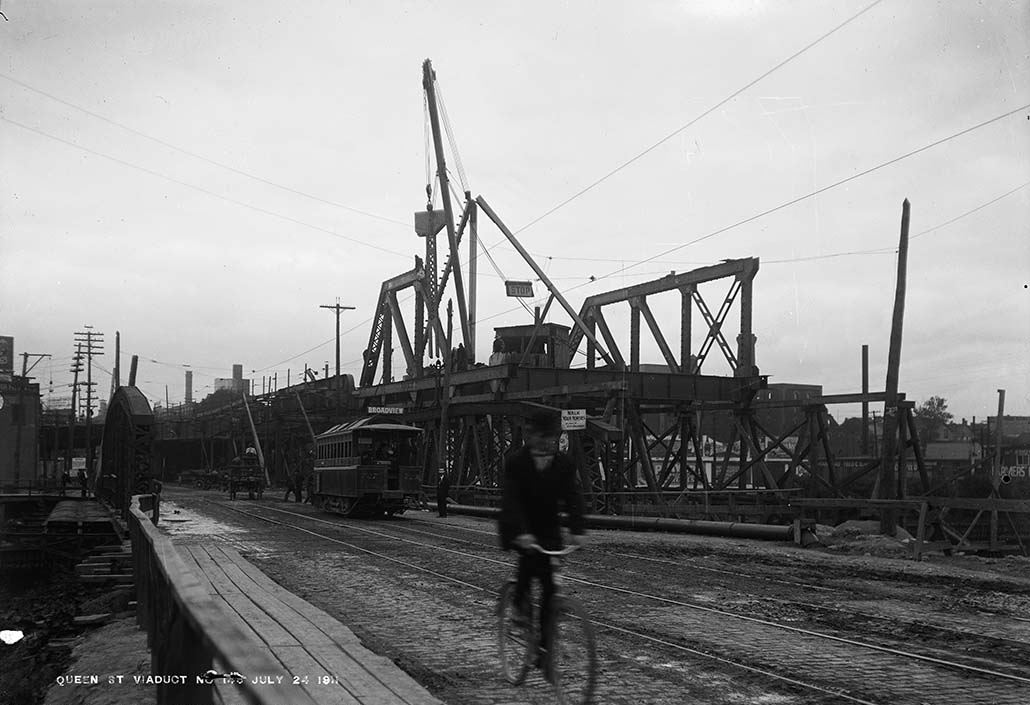
Penny-farthing and safety bicycles arrived in Toronto in the late-1800s.

Toronto was no exception when the penny-farthing, and later the safety bicycle, arrived in North American cities in the late 19th century. This predated the advent of the automobile. The roads at the time were not ideal for bicycle travel. With the advent of the automobile the romance of the bicycle faded. It wasn't until the 10-speed bike boom of the 1970s that use of the bicycle for transportation in Toronto regained some traction, including the creation of the Beltline Trail.

In 1975, the Toronto City Cycling Committee was established by the former City to promote cycling and safety initiatives. It was composed of cycling advocates, City Councillors and volunteers. In forming the committee, Council adopted the following policy statement: "Council recognizes that the bicycle, as an integral and efficient form of transportation and as a means of recreation, can make a significant contribution to the quality of City life; therefore, it is the policy of Council to implement programs that will promote and facilitate greater and safer use of the bicycle."

In 2001, Toronto City Council adopted the Toronto Bike Plan with the aim of doubling the number of cycling trips and reducing crashes and injuries by 2011.

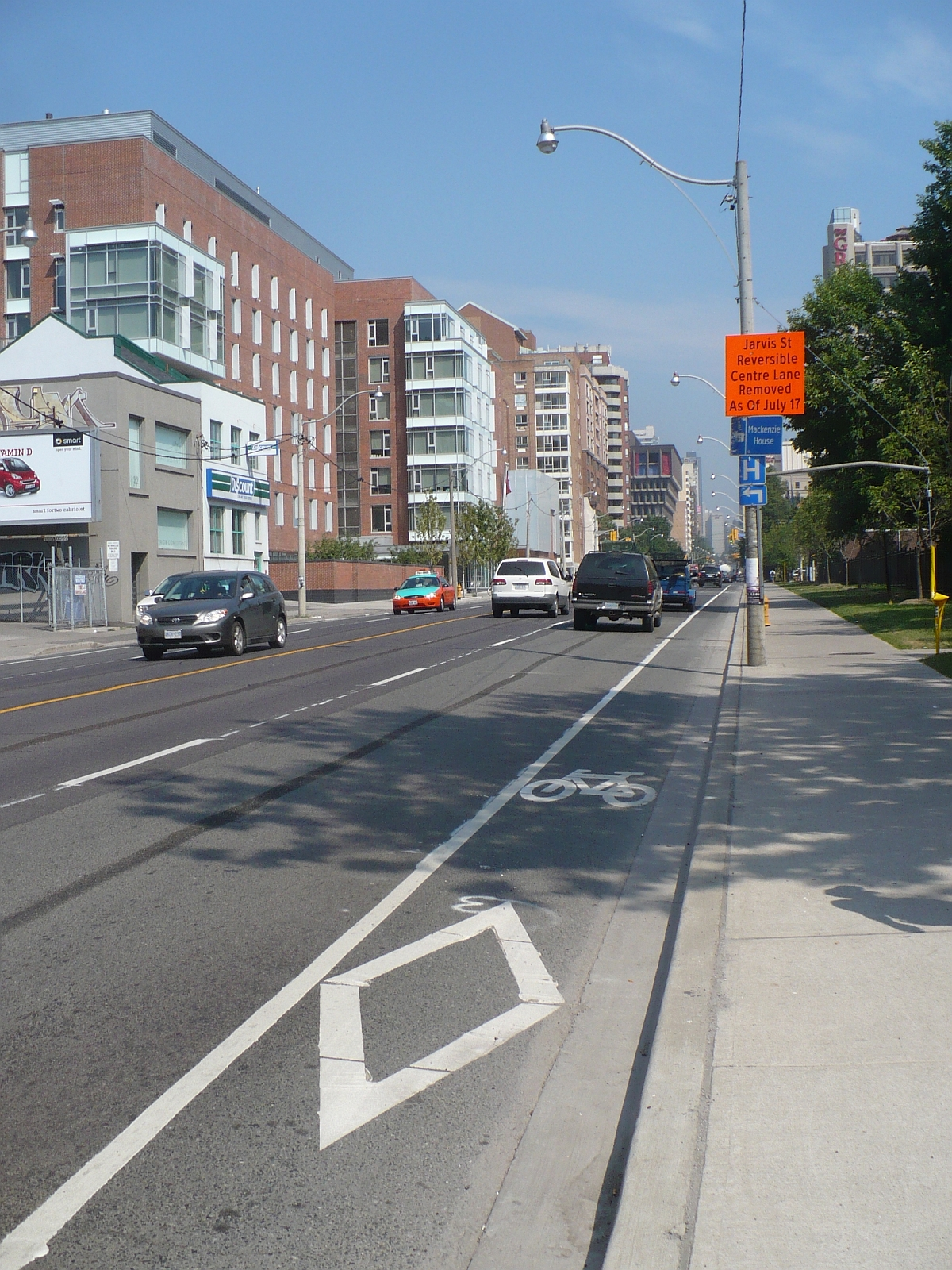
Bike lanes on Jarvis Street were installed in 2010, and removed again in 2012

On May 25, 2009, Toronto City Council voted 28–16 to remove the reversible centre commuter traffic lane on Jarvis Street and improve the streetscape by widening sidewalks, planting trees, installing heritage plaques, and implementing bicycle lanes. In 2011, after the election of new mayor Rob Ford, a new Council voted to remove the bicycle lanes and reinstate the previous configuration. The Council opted to direct cyclists to use the existing bicycle route along the parallel Sherbourne Street. On November 17, 2012, following removal of the bicycle lanes, the reversible centre lane reopened.

Starting in 2011, under Mayor Rob Ford, Bike Share Toronto began operating a bicycle-sharing system, with over 6000 bikes and 600 stations across the city. Since 2015, several major streets such as Bloor Street have gained segregated bike lanes, with lanes planned along Eglinton Avenue following the completion of Line 5 Eglinton construction work in the early 2020s.

During the COVID-19 pandemic, 40 km of bike lanes were installed across the city along major corridors as part of physical distancing measures in a project called ActiveTO. As with previous trial projects such as on Bloor Street in 2016, ActiveTO installations involved temporary barriers and minimal changes to street layout. These bike lanes were made permanent in Dec 2021, after results showed high ridership, increased safety and minimal travel time delays for drivers.

== Infrastructure and support ==
Following the 2001 Toronto Bike Plan, Toronto City Council has approved several updated plans including the 2016 10 Year Cycling Network Plan, and the 2021 Cycling Network Plan Update. This sets out a plan to create a citywide cycling network of on-road, off-road bikeways, signage and parking. The other major prong of the bike plan is education and promotion to reduce the number of collisions/falls and to increase the number of people who bike.

The Bike Plan is a major program to dramatically expand the network through on-road bike lanes, signed routes and off-road multi-use paths. The goal was that by 2011 any cyclist in the city proper should be within a five-minute ride of a designated bike route. The network is planned for 1000 km of bikeways including 500 km of on-street bike lanes, and another 250 km of off-road paved trails. As of 2022, around 750 kilometres of the 1000 km proposed bikeway network is in place, with 367 km of this on street.

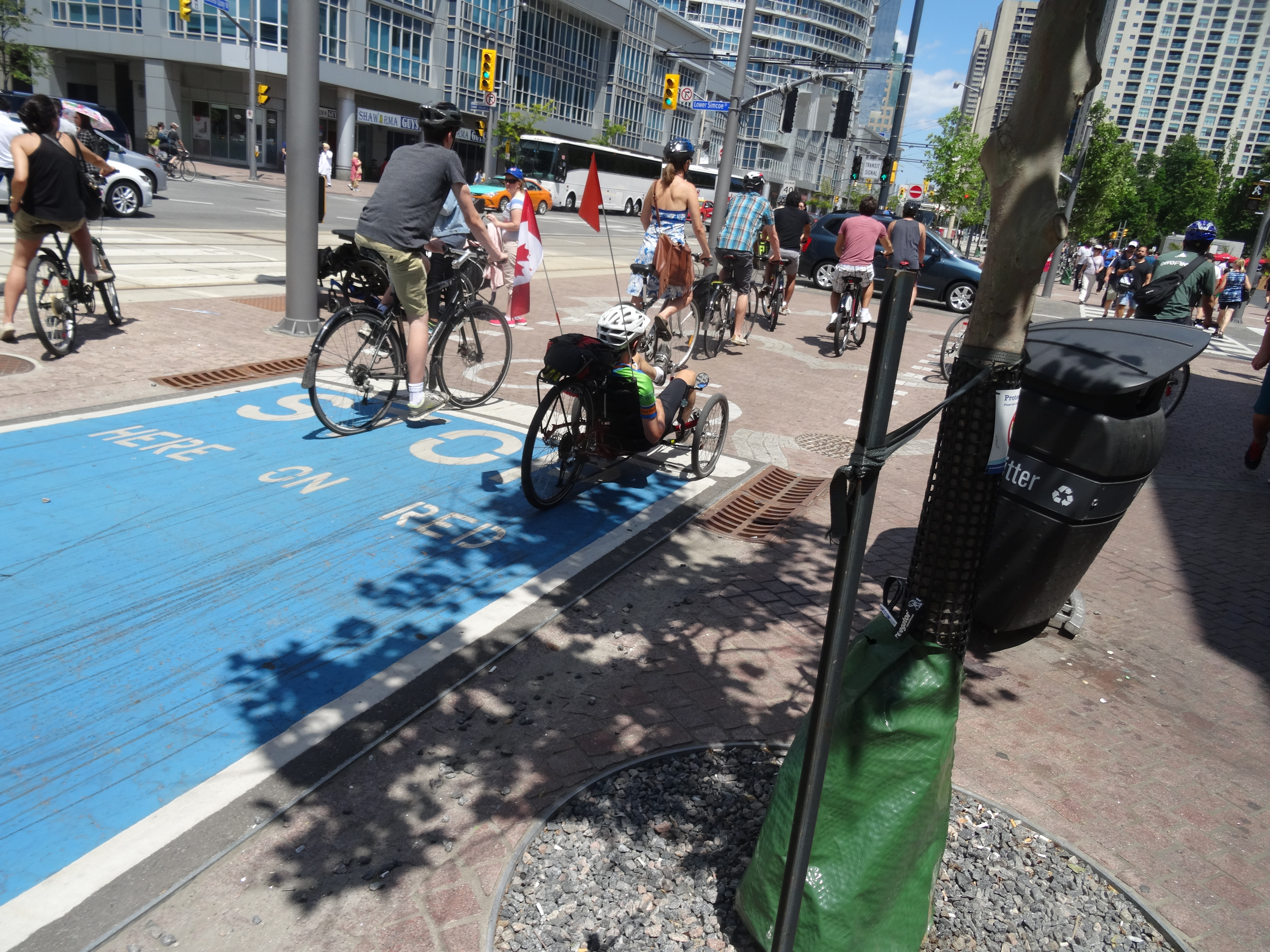
Bike lanes at Queens Quay. Bike lanes were introduced in order to protect cyclists.

Two major off-road paved trails along the Don and Humber river valleys provide a backbone for transport on the east and west side of the downtown area. The two trails are connected by the Martin Goodman Trail along the lakeshore as part of the larger Waterfront Trail that goes along Lake Ontario. All of these off-road trails are heavily used by cyclists but still have some issues with continuity and trail quality that keep them from being prime cycling transportation corridors.

The city has installed thousands of post and ring stands for on-street bike parking in the last few years.

=== Legality ===
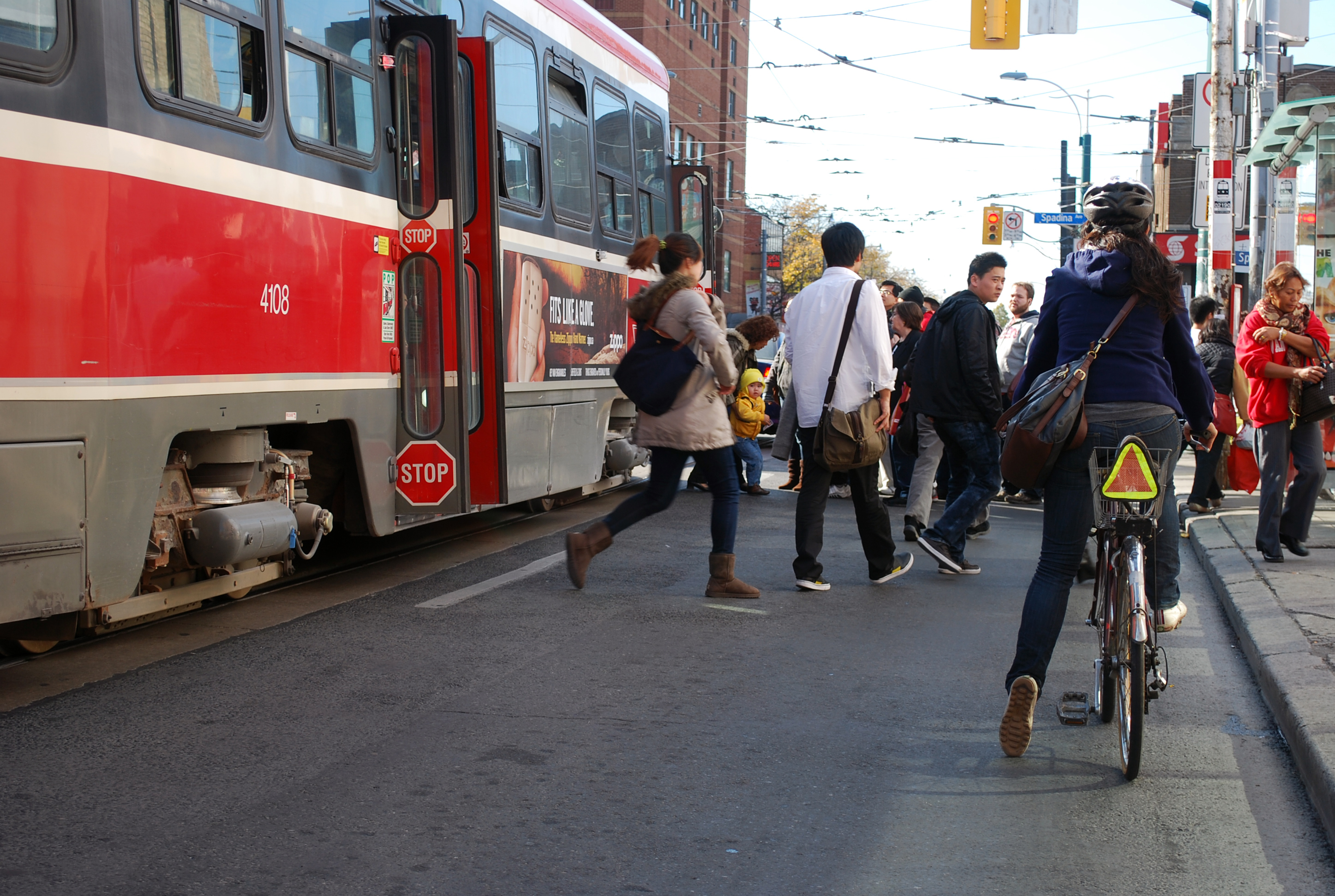
A cyclist stops for TTC streetcar passengers. Cycling is covered under the Highway Traffic Act.

Cycling as transportation is covered under the Ontario Highway Traffic Act.

=== Education ===
The City of Toronto offers CAN-BIKE cycling skills courses. CAN-BIKE's philosophy is to train cyclists of all levels how to ride safely as a vehicle in regular traffic, also known as vehicular cycling by proponents of John Forester.

A number of different organizations offer bike mechanic workshops, such as the Toronto District School Board, Community Bicycle Network, Bike Pirates, BikeSauce and Bikechain. Except the Toronto District School Board, all of these organisations also have public access tool use and bicycle repair and recycling, with different pay scales for shop use (depending on the organisation).

=== Bike Share Toronto ===
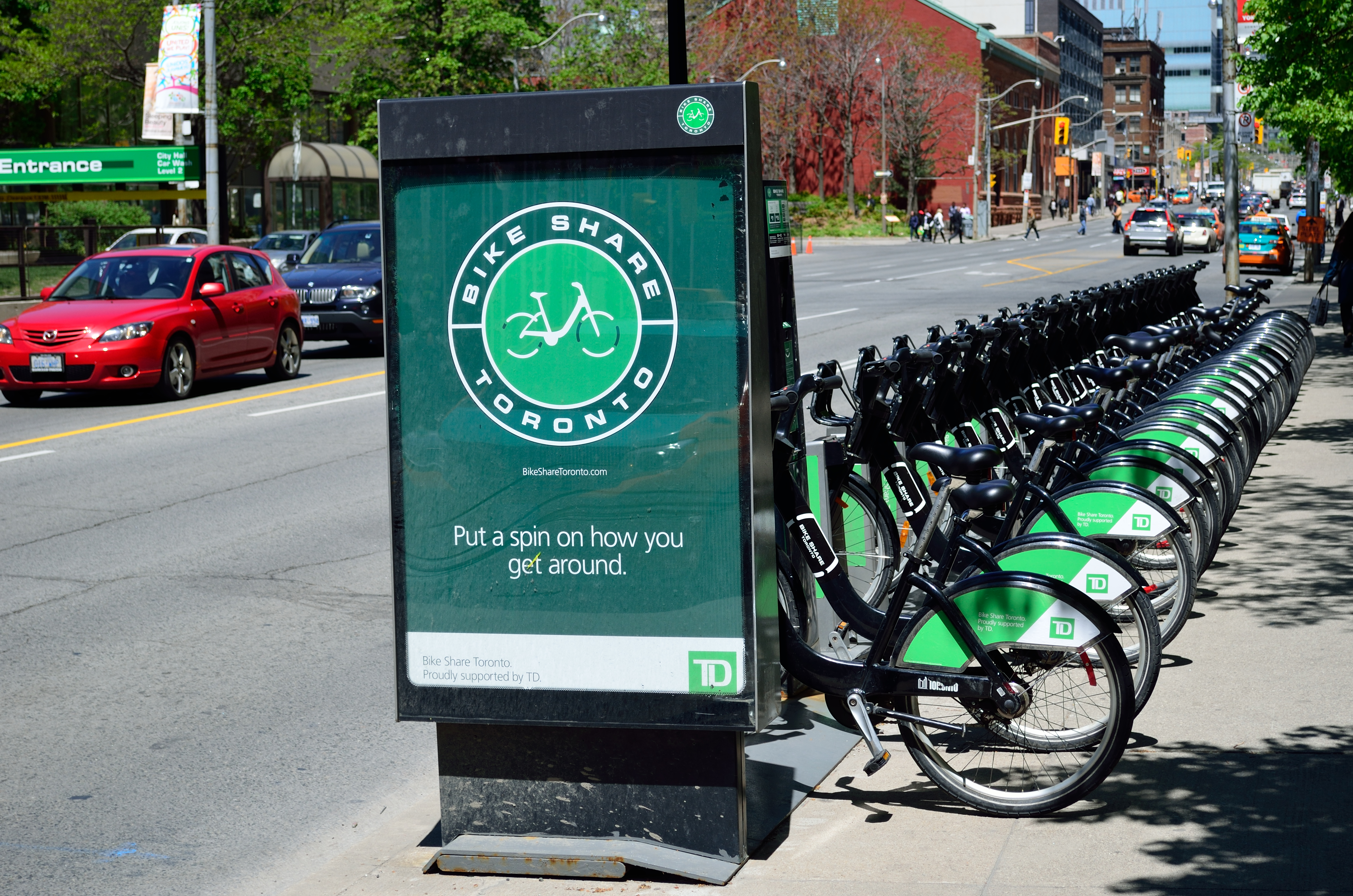
A Bike Share Toronto rental kiosk. The bicycle sharing system was launched in May 2011.

Toronto's bike share system—Bike Share Toronto—launched on May 3, 2011, as part of the Montreal-based Public Bike System Company's (PBSC) BIXI brand of bike shares. In 2014, the system was taken over by the Toronto Parking Authority following PBSC's financial difficulties, and was rebranded as Bike Share Toronto. The system covers over 200 square kilometres (80 square miles) of the city, with bike stations available within an area bounded by Finch Avenue in the north, Rouge Park in the east, Lake Ontario to the south, and to Long Branch to the west. Users can purchase yearly or monthly memberships and can then rent the bikes from any of the stations. Additional charges are incurred after the first half hour. Expansion of the system took place in the late 2010s, increasing the system to a total of 6850 bicycles and 625 stations. By 2023, the system had 756 stations and 8,970 bicycles (including 1,815 e-bikes) and served 5.7 million rides.

The system is the second bike sharing system in Toronto. The first was the Community Bicycle Network's popular BikeShare program which ran from 2001 to 2006 with approximately 150 bikes and 15 stations. It closed due to a lack of long-term grant funds and lack of alternative funding sources to cover all the costs, such as advertising revenues or membership fees.

=== Public transit ===
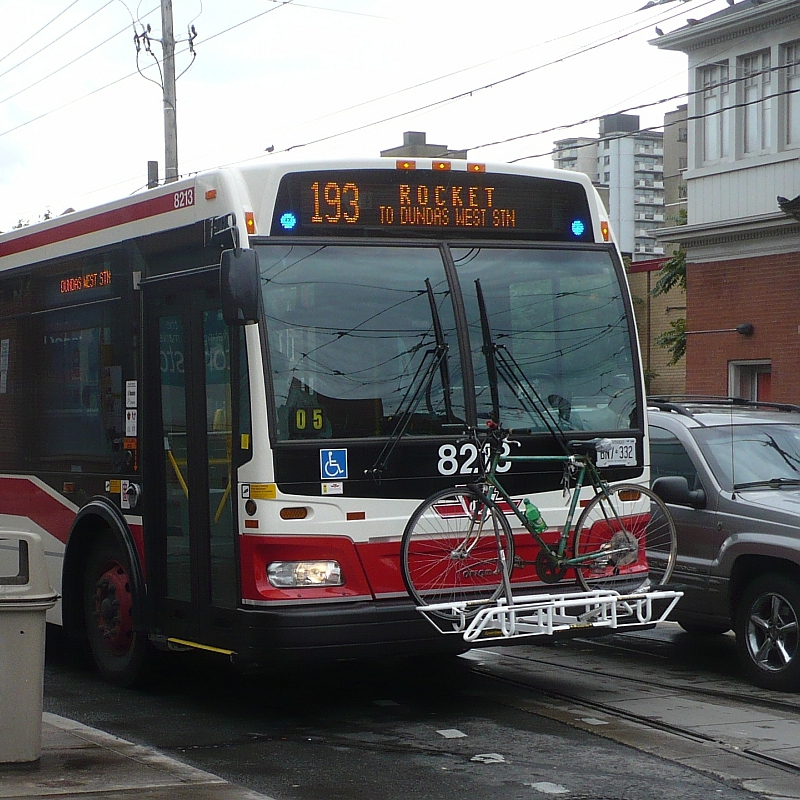
A TTC bus with a bicycle on its bicycle carrier. The TTC had bicycle carriers installed on nearly all buses in their fleet.

All TTC buses have bicycle racks. Bicycles are allowed on the subway outside of the morning and evening rush hours. The Toronto Bike Plan, in the "Cycling and transit" chapter, aims to improve accessibility to bikes on transit as well as parking at transit locations.

Additionally, GO Transit also provides bike racks on all their bus routes, and allows bicycles on their trains outside of weekday rush hours. As of 2008, folding bicycles are allowed at all times, including rush hour. Summer GO Train service to Niagara includes dedicated bicycle cars which have all seats on the bottom floor removed and replaced with bicycle racks.

== Organizations ==
Compared to many North American cities, Toronto has a well-established municipal government Cycling Office. It has been in charge of fulfilling the Toronto Bike Plan by adding bike lanes, hosting Bike Month, and CAN-Bike. The City previously had a Toronto Cycling Advisory Committee that existed to advise the Transportation Department and City Council on cycling issues. The committee was not re-established for the 2010-2014 Council term.

There are also a number of independent cycling organizations in Toronto providing advocacy, recreational and community economic development services:

- Advocacy:
  - Advocacy for Respect for Cyclists advocates on behalf of cyclists providing important information on legal issues as well as supporting memorials for cyclists killed while on their bike.
  - Formed in 2008, Cycle Toronto (formerly the Toronto Cyclists Union) is Toronto's only member-based cycling advocacy organization.
  - The Toronto Coalition for Active Transportation is a coalition of organizations interested in researching and advocating for better cycling and pedestrian infrastructure and policy in Toronto.
- Bicycle cooperatives:
  - There are about half a dozen bike co-ops in Toronto, including bikeSauce, Bike Pirates, and the Community Bicycle Network. These are non-profit assisted-self-service bike repair shops. Some also sell refurbished bicycles. For more information, see the list on the Bike Collective Network wiki.
- Recreational:
  - The Toronto Bicycling Network is Toronto's large recreational cycling organization, with many bike rides and trips throughout the year and a history of advocacy going back to the days when it had a seat on the Toronto Cycling Committee.
  - Both the Take the Tooker campaign and Bells on Bloor campaign pushed for a bike lane across Bloor Street. They also hosted the largest bike ride in Toronto with thousands of cyclists taking over Bloor Street every spring.

== Statistics ==
=== Number of cyclists ===
A 1999 Decima Research study showed that 48 percent of Torontonians were cyclists and 60% of households owned bicycles. During the peak summer months, cyclists in Toronto made more than three million trips per week, including over 1.6 million recreation trips. Approximately 20 percent of the population (388,000) are utilitarian cyclists, riding to work and school, going shopping, running errands or going visiting.

The largest age groups of utilitarian and recreational cyclists were the 18-34 and 35-39 age groups. Gender-wise cyclists split about 60 percent male and 40 percent female. 23 percent of utilitarian cyclists continue to cycle through the winter whereas only 5 percent of recreational cyclists do the same. Bicycle ownership and recreational cyclists levels were fairly level across the city. Utility cycling, however, is much higher in Central Toronto (comprising York, East York and Old Toronto). Utilitarian cyclists are much more concerned about careless drivers, poor road conditions and car doors opening in comparison to non-cyclists and recreational cyclists.

=== Safety ===
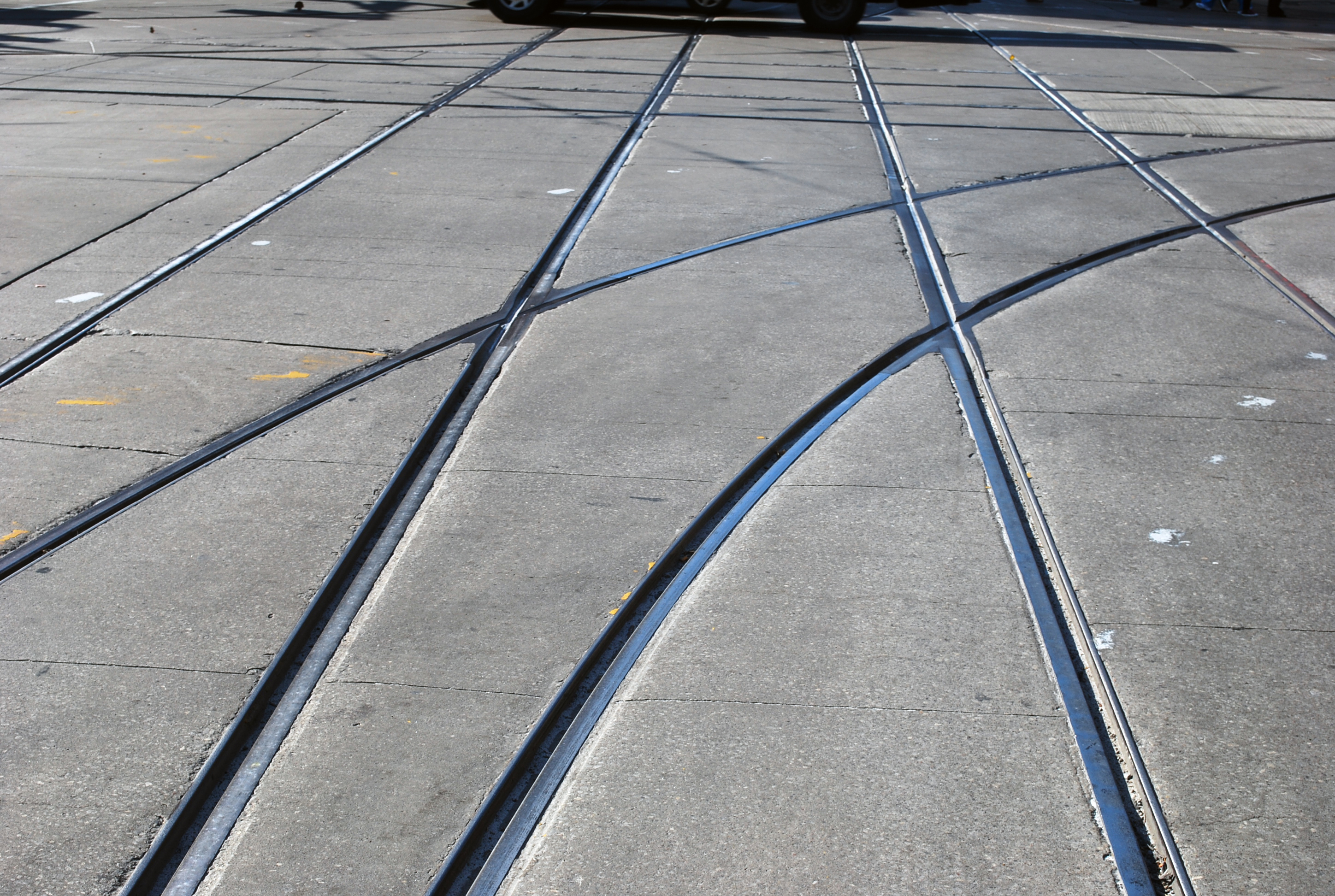
Cyclists in Toronto need to be careful when traversing over TTC streetcar track, as bicycle tires may get stuck in them.

The 2003 Toronto Bicycle/Motor-Vehicle Collision Study found that cycling collisions in Toronto were most frequent on arterial roads, particularly on central east–west routes where cycling volumes are high. The majority of collisions occurred at intersections and most of those involved motor-vehicle turning manoeuvres.

Away from intersections, collisions most often involved a motorist overtaking a cyclist, or opening a car door in the path of a cyclist. In the central area of the city, the most frequent type of collision involved a motorist opening their car door in the path of a cyclist. Almost 30% of the cyclists were cycling on the sidewalk immediately prior to their collisions.

== Tourism ==
The Toronto-Niagara Bike Train Initiative has helped connect Toronto cyclists with Niagara Region bike trails via Via Rail. The Waterfront Trail organization has been instrumental in getting a mostly-continuous bike trail across a large stretch of the north shore of Lake Ontario, including Toronto. It has also promoted the trail as an interesting route for cycle tourism.

== See also ==
- Cycling in Canada
- Toronto Donut Ride
