= TBN =

TBN may mean:

== Media ==
- Trinity Broadcasting Network, an international religious television network
- The Baseball Network, former US television network
- The Buffalo News, a newspaper

== Other ==
- The Barter Network, a commercial trading network
- Toronto Bicycling Network, a recreational cycling organization
- Total base number, an indicator for the alkalinity of lubricant oil
- Trombone, a musical instrument
- Waynesville–St. Robert Regional Airport
