= Advocacy for Respect for Cyclists =

Advocacy group in Toronto, Canada

- Type: Nonprofit
- Industry: Cycling
- Founded: 1996; Toronto, Ontario
- Headquarters: Toronto, Ontario, Canada
- Area served: Toronto
- Number of employees: 10 regular volunteers
- Website: respectcyclists.org

Advocacy for Respect for Cyclists (ARC) is a Toronto advocacy group formed in 1996. A group of cyclists felt a pressing need for an organization to advocate on behalf of the needs of cyclists after a period of time where two cyclists were killed by trucks and another two arrested on a Critical Mass ride. ARC was initially formed to lobby for a coroner's inquest and to help in the defense of the two cyclists arrested at Critical Mass. It has since expanded to provide support and legal advice to cyclists involved in accidents, to educate on cyclists' rights, and to hold direct actions aimed at changing society's dependence on the automobile.

== Coroner's report ==
In 1996, two cyclists were killed on the streets of Toronto, Erin Krauser and Martha Kennedy. With calls from ARC and other activists, the City began a coroner's investigation. Along with representatives of Toronto Police, Ontario's Ministry of Transportation, the City of Toronto, the Toronto Transit Commission and the trucking industry, injury prevention professionals, ARC's volunteers sat on the committee to examine the conditions for the deaths of these cyclists.

The Coroner's report, titled "A Report on Cycling Fatalities in Toronto 1986–1996: Recommendations for Reducing Cycling Injuries and Death", was released in 1998. The points of the report that ARC felt were the most likely to reduce cyclists' injuries and death were revisions to the Highway Traffic Act, in particular that cyclists have the right of way over cars and pedestrians the right of way over cyclists; the creation of comprehensive on-street bike lanes and off-street trails; and side guards on large trucks to reduce the chances of cyclists being 'sucked' in by the large wheels.

== Report card ==
In 2003, ARC began producing a 'report card' on the conditions for cyclists in Toronto. It graded the city and the municipal government for efforts in improving cycling infrastructure.

== Mission ==
ARC's mission is:

- Lobbying and education on issues of cyclists’ rights.
- Legal defense, support, and advice for survivors of car-bike collisions, and for cyclists unfairly charged with traffic offenses.
- Direct action and grassroots agitation directed at changing our society’s dependence on the automobile.

== See also ==
- Cycling in Toronto
- Toronto Bicycling Network
- Cycle Toronto (formerly the Toronto Cyclists Union)
