= Toronto-Niagara Bike Train =

The Toronto-Niagara Bike Train (known in short as "The Bike Train") is an initiative in Southern Ontario allowing cyclists to travel by train on Via Rail to destinations across Ontario including Toronto, Niagara Falls, St. Catharines, and North Bay, as well as the city of Montreal in Quebec. 2009 saw an expansion of the Bike Train Initiative, with new routes and more weekends of service.

The Bike Train initiative is independently coordinated, promoted, and ticketed service, utilizing existing Via Rail passenger trains, with an additional baggage car containing bike racks for 56 bicycles. Each passenger ticket for scheduled Bike Train departures includes both a passenger seat and a bike rack reservation.

The Bike Train initiative was developed in response to the growing tourism demand and economic opportunity for improved transportation access for cyclists between Toronto and the Niagara Region.

== History ==
Project founder Justin Lafontaine conceptualized the idea for the Toronto-Niagara Bike Train Initiative during a trip to the Niagara Region in April 2006. On that trip, he accompanied the Waterfront Regeneration Trust and several others from the region on their annual Lake Ontario Waterfront Trail cycle tour from Niagara-on-the-Lake, Ontario to Grimsby, Ontario. Impressed with the many trails, diverse landscapes, towns, cities and attractions, he began planning another trip to the region.

When discussing the opportunities for cycle tourism with a fellow rider, Justin discovered that there was no convenient transportation option for cyclists between Toronto and the Niagara Region; the existing train service did not provide baggage capacity, and buses usually require bikes to be boxed prior to loading. This led him to Via Rail Canada and other partners to discuss the potential to introduce a Bike Train service – a concept that garnered support from government contacts, tourism organizations, small businesses, media and the public.

A project proposal was subsequently developed for the Ontario Ministry of Tourism - Investment Development Office and funding for the Pilot Year of the Toronto-Niagara Bike Train Initiative was announced in January 2007.

In 2008, The Bike Train received further funding support from the Ontario Ministry of the Environment and the Friends of the Greenbelt Foundation.

In 2009, with the support from the Ontario Trillium Foundation, Friends of the Greenbelt Foundation and the Ontario Ministry of Tourism the Bike Train expanded to two new routes. The Ontario North route took passengers from Toronto to North Bay using the Ontario Northland's passenger rail service for a pilot weekend in August. The new Montreal - Toronto route provided daily service between Canada's two biggest cities.

== Partners and supporters ==
=== Previous funding partners ===
- Ontario Ministry of Tourism
- Friends of the Greenbelt Foundation
- Ontario Trillium Foundation

=== Lead organizations ===
- Transportation Options
- Waterfront Regeneration Trust
- Niagara-on-the-Lake Chamber of Commerce

=== Project partners ===
- City of Toronto government
- Via Rail Canada
- Ontario Northland Railway

=== Promotional partners ===
- Ontario Wine Council
- Pedal Magazine
- NOW Magazine
- Destination Ontario

=== Legal advisor ===
- Michael Carey, Lawyer, Macdonald Sager Manis LLP Cabuna

=== Other supporters ===
- Brock University
- City of St. Catharines, Ontario
- Cycle Ontario
- Grimsby Chamber of Commerce
- Grimsby Downtown Improvement Area
- Grimsby Economic Development Committee
- I Bike T.O.
- Niagara Falls Downtown BIA
- Niagara Falls Tourism
- Niagara Freewheelers Bicycle Touring Club
- Niagara Fruit Education Centre
- Niagara Parks Commission
- Regional Municipality of Niagara
- Regional Niagara Bicycling Committee
- Toronto Metropolitan University
- Toronto Coalition for Active Transportation (TCAT)
- Toronto Cyclists Union
- Tourism Toronto
