= Bike Share Toronto =

Canadian bicycle-sharing system

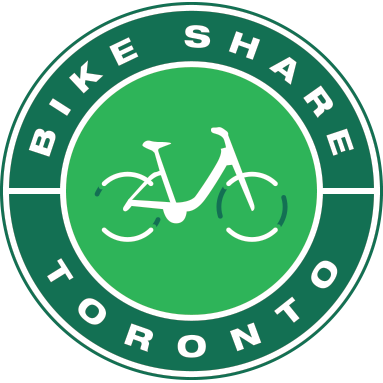

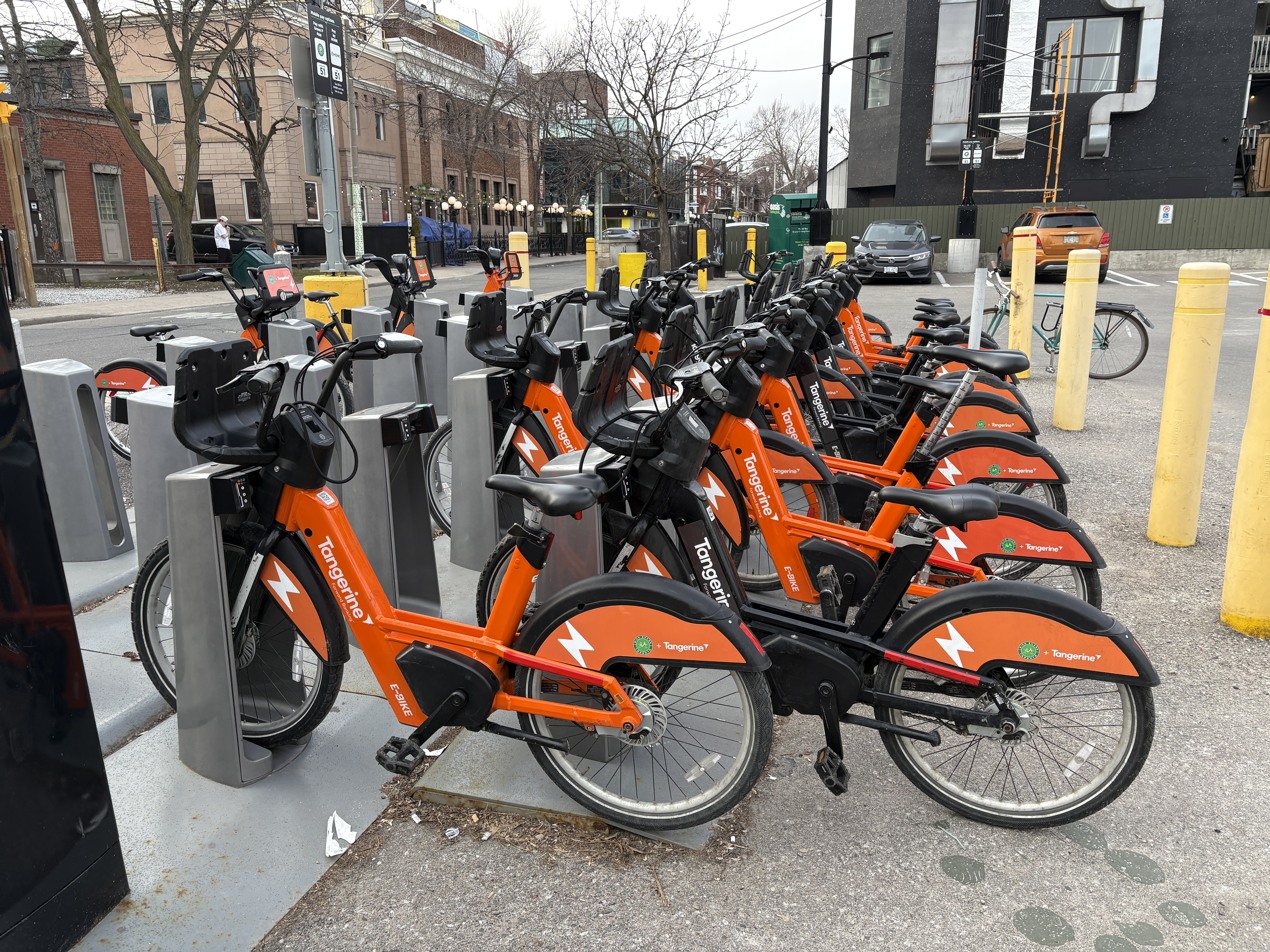
- E-bikes at an electric charging station

Overview
- Owner: Toronto Parking Authority
- Locale: Toronto, Canada
- Transit type: Bicycle-sharing system
- Number of stations: 1060
- Annual ridership: 7.8 million (2025)
- Website: bikesharetoronto.com

Operation
- Began operation: May 3, 2011 (as Bixi Toronto)
- Operator: Shift Transit
- Number of vehicles: 10,400 bikes (including 2,100 e-bikes)

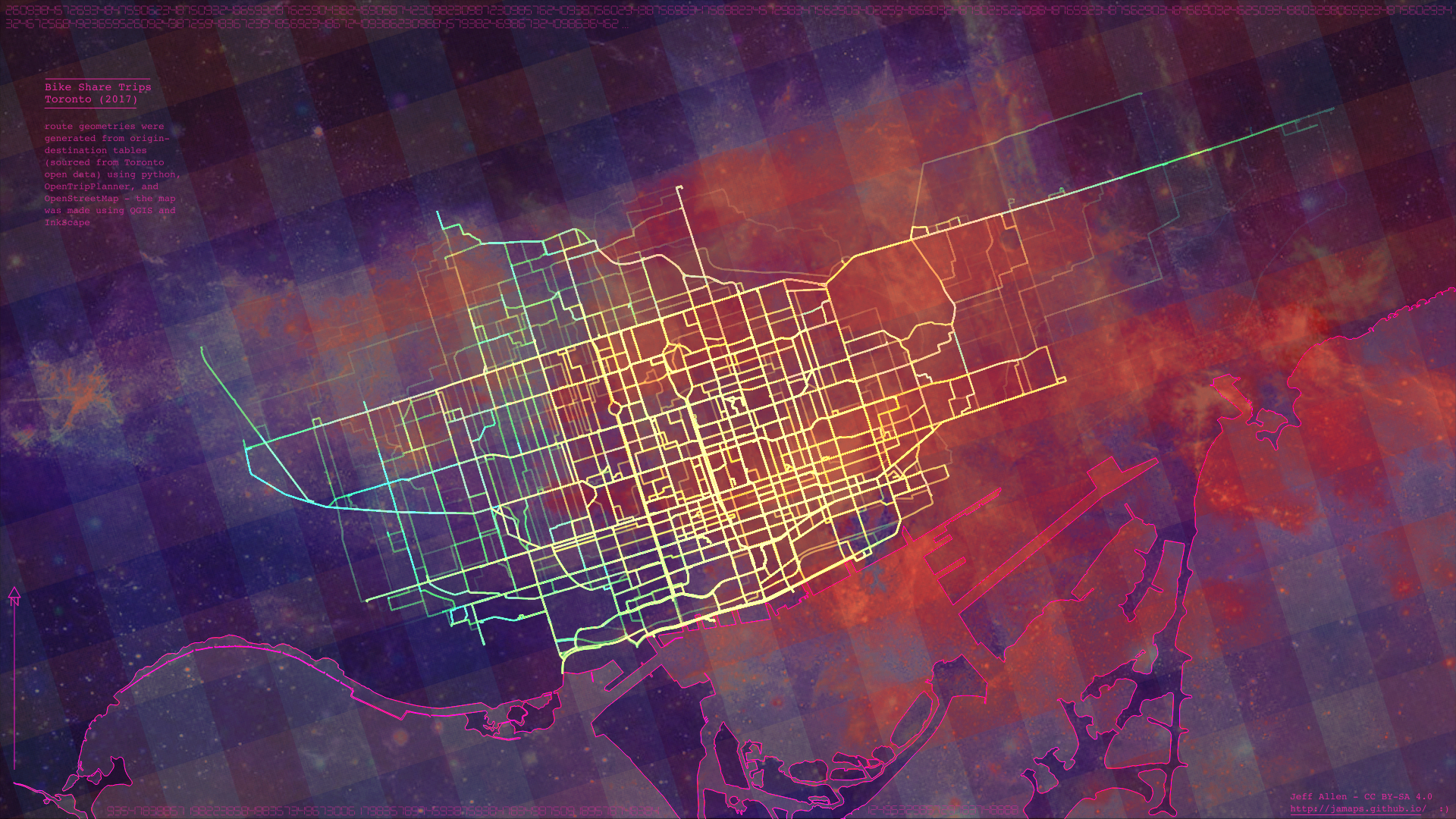
All Bike Share trips in Toronto in 2017

Bike Share Toronto is a bicycle-sharing system in Toronto, Ontario, operated by the Toronto Parking Authority (TPA). The system consists of over 10,400 bicycles and over 1000 stations in all 25 wards of the city.

The system was launched in 2011 by PBSC Urban Solutions under the BIXI brand and was taken over by the City of Toronto through the Toronto Parking Authority in 2014. The system is currently sponsored by Tangerine Bank. Since 2016, the system has been gradually expanded, with ridership increasing to a high of 7.8 million rides in 2025.

== History ==
Bike Share Toronto launched in 2011 as BIXI Toronto, with 80 stations centred around the downtown core of Toronto and 1,000 bicycles. The system was operated by PBSC.

In 2013, PBSC announced that it was unable to pay back $3.9 million of a $4.5 million loan from the City of Toronto and filed for bankruptcy. The City decided to cover the loan by diverting money from an automated public-toilets program. The City then took control of the bike-share program, and April 1, 2014, the Toronto Parking Authority (TPA) took control of the system, and renamed it to Bike Share Toronto. The new operator of the system was Alta Bicycle Share (now Motivate).

A planned expansion of 22 stations for the 2015 Pan Am/Parapan Am Games was abandoned. The original stations operated on a hybrid platform; software was supplied by 8D and hardware came from PBSC. Later, each company developed its own full system of hardware and software, no longer supporting integration of components with other vendors. As a result, all existing stations would have to be replaced or retrofitted.

=== System expansion ===
Bike Share Toronto has grown from a small downtown system into a citywide network in three broad phases: a run of downtown expansions funded by other levels of government in the late 2010s, a push into the suburbs during the COVID-19 pandemic, and a four-year growth plan from 2022 to 2025 that brought the system to all 25 wards and shifted much of its growth to e-bikes.

==== Downtown growth (2016–2019) ====
The first major expansion, in June 2016, doubled the system to 200 stations and 2,000 bicycles. It was funded by $4.9 million from Metrolinx and $1.1 million in Section 37 funds. The TPA chose PBSC to supply the new bicycles and stations, and to retrofit the existing stations to work with them. On April 1, 2017, day-to-day operation passed to Shift Transit, a PBSC partner company, while the TPA kept ownership of the system.

The system then grew every year. With $4 million from the Government of Canada and the City of Toronto, the August 2017 expansion brought the system to 270 stations and 2,750 bikes, and the August 2018 expansion to 360 stations and 3,750 bikes. A further 105 stations and 1,250 bikes followed in 2019. Over these years the system's footprint stayed largely within the downtown core.

==== Suburban expansion (2020–2021) ====
In June 2020 the TPA announced the system's first large move beyond downtown: 160 stations and 1,850 bicycles in areas such as North York and Scarborough. This expanded the service area to over 200 square kilometres (80 square miles), with stations in 20 of the city's 25 wards. The expansion also brought the system's first 300 e-bikes, intended to make hilly areas and longer trips easier to ride.

The larger network arrived as demand for the system rose sharply during the pandemic. In 2021 Bike Share Toronto began work on a plan for its next phase of growth.

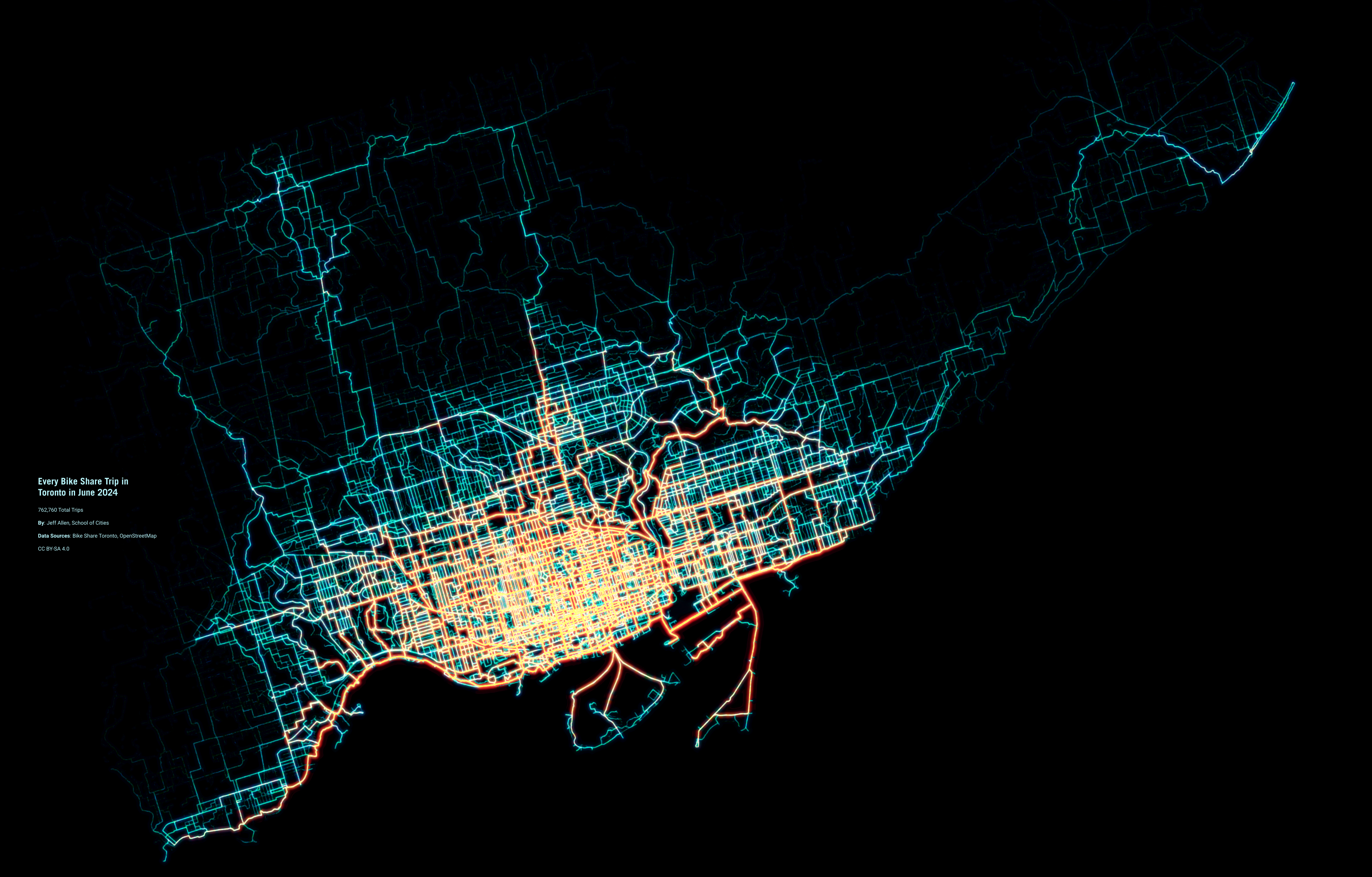
Visualization of every Bike Share trip in Toronto in June 2024, by the School of Cities

==== Four-year growth plan (2022–2025) ====
In 2022 the TPA announced a four-year growth plan to take the system from 625 stations and 7,165 bikes to more than 1,000 stations and 10,000 bikes (including 2,500 e-bikes) by 2025. The plan also aimed to reach all 25 wards and to improve first and last mile connections and equitable access to the system. Early growth under the plan focused on adding stations. The 2022 equipment purchase added 13 stations, 225 e-bikes and 100 classic bikes, and 122 stations were added in 2023.

From 2024 the plan's emphasis shifted to electrification. That year the system added 70 solar stations and 335 e-docks, which charge e-bikes while they are docked, reaching 862 stations.

By the end of the plan in 2025, Bike Share Toronto had stations in all 25 wards, two more than a year earlier, along with about 10,400 bikes (up 9%) and 1,375 e-docks (up 39%). E-bikes made up about a fifth of the fleet, at 2,117 bikes. The system also reached the Toronto Islands for the first time, with a seasonal deployment that ran from May to October.

With the four-year plan complete, the TPA board approved a growth strategy to 2030. It calls for adding 5,700 solar docks and 1,660 e-docks over five years, along with 2,550 more e-bikes. In its first year, 2026, the strategy concentrates new solar stations along major transit corridors such as Line 1 Yonge–University, in the Financial District and waterfront, and in Scarborough.

=== Ridership ===
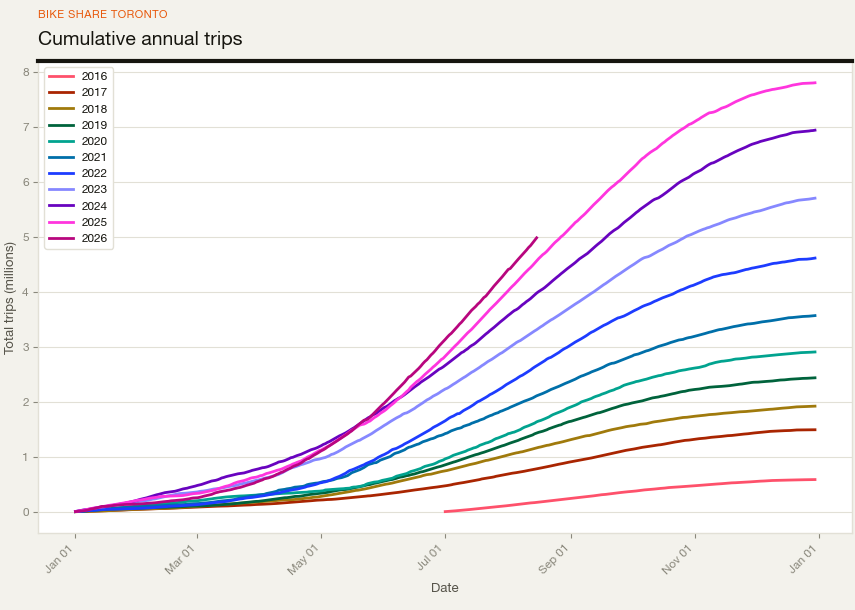
Cumulative annual trips, June 2016 – August 2026

Ridership is measured in the number of trips taken. A trip is counted whenever a bicycle is undocked and re-docked.

Annual ridership has risen in every year since the system was rebranded, growing from roughly 667,000 trips in 2015 to 7.8 million in 2025. Ridership more than tripled between 2019, the last full year before the COVID-19 pandemic, and 2025.

In July 2025 the system recorded more than one million trips in a single month for the first time, a mark it passed again in August.

Electric bicycles account for a disproportionate share of trips relative to their share of the fleet. E-bikes made up about a fifth of the bicycles in service in 2025 but generated roughly 19 per cent of trips and were ridden more than twice as often per bicycle per day as conventional bikes. E-bike trips rose from about 89,000 in 2022 to approximately 1.1 million in 2024.

The system reported approximately 231,000 first-time riders in 2025, an increase of about 39 per cent over the previous year, and casual (non-member) trips made up roughly 27 per cent of the total. A seasonal deployment of 250 bicycles and four stations on the Toronto Islands, operating between May and October 2025, accounted for about 216,000 trips.

The Toronto Parking Authority's 2030 growth strategy anticipates ridership roughly doubling again by the end of the decade.

Bike Share Toronto ridership
Year	Ridership	Average daily ridership	Growth
2015	667,000	1,827	N/A
2016	834,235	2,285	25%
2017	1,492,369	4,089	79%
2018	1,922,955	5,268	29%
2019	2,439,517	6,684	27%
2020	2,911,308	7,976	19%
2021	3,575,182	9,795	23%
2022	4,620,469	12,659	29%
2023	5,713,141	15,652	24%
2024	6,953,094	19,050	22%
2025	7,812,520	21,404	12%

== Payment and Pricing ==
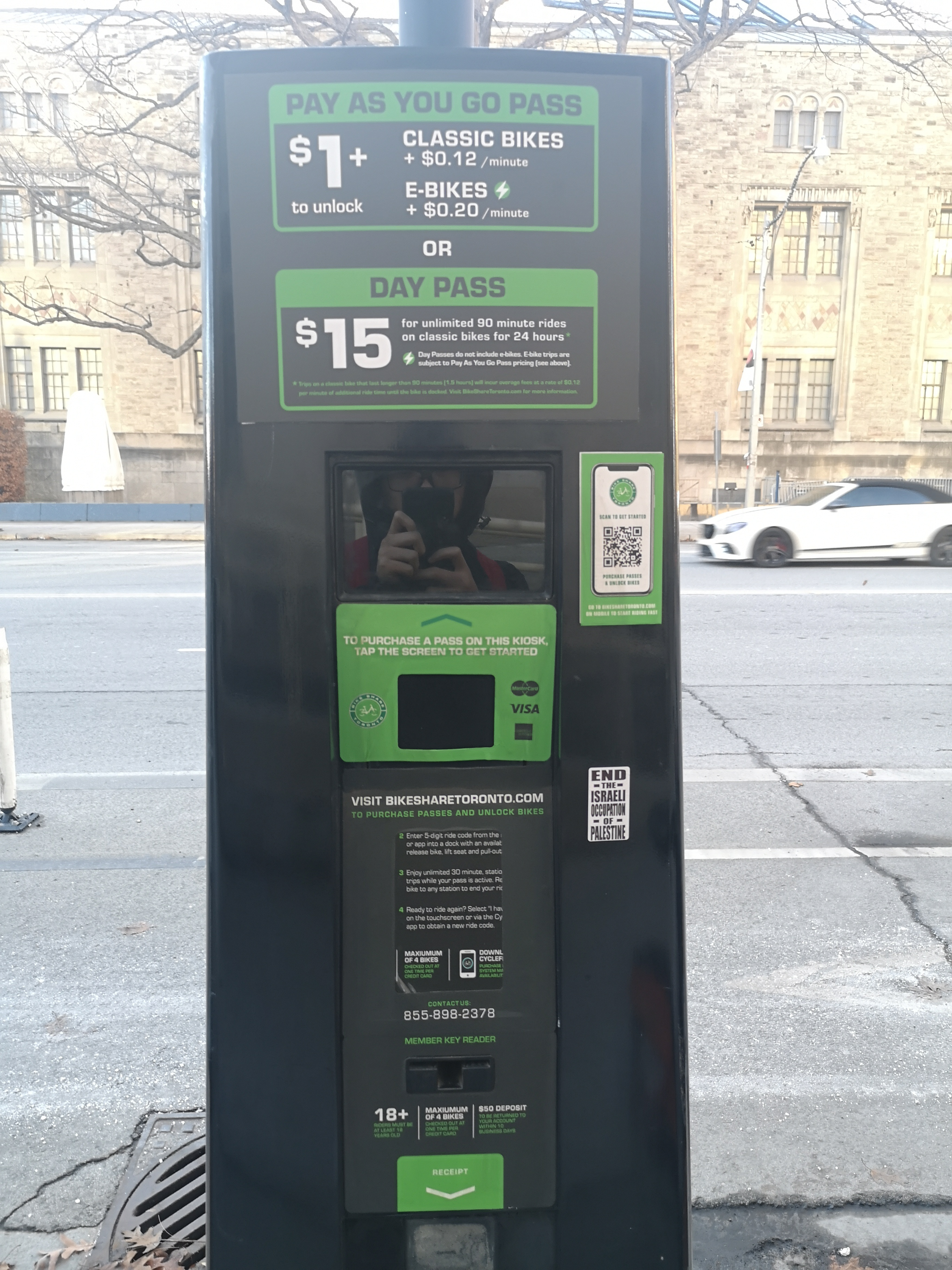
Payment Kiosk 2023

Payment can done via a payment kiosk installed at each station, by key card at each dock, through their mobile app, or through their mobile website. As of 2026, the primary mode of payment is via the mobile app and website. Many stations no longer have payment kiosks.

Riders who have no membership or pass must pay a $1 unlock fee. After which, they will be charged a fee based on duration of use. The fees are $0.12/min for a classic bicycle and $0.20/min for an e-bike. A 24-hour pass may also be purchased for $15, which allows for unlimited 90 minute rides on classic bikes.

Annual memberships are also available. There are two tiers, the Annual 30 which allows for unlimited 30 minute trips at $105/year, and the Annual 45 which allows for unlimited 45 minute trips at $120/year. Both tiers only provide unlimited trips on classic bicycles, but halves the rates of e-bikes to $0.10/min.

Exceeding the duration limit will incur overage fees. These fees are priced at the normal rates the riders pay for classic and e-bike usage. It is recommended that riders dock and undock another bike often to reset this duration.

=== Reduced Fare Pass Program ===
Subsidized Toronto Community Housing tenants are eligible for the Annual 30 plan for a reduced price of $5, while market rate tenants are eligible for a 20% discount off annual membership rates. Ontario Disability Support Program recipients may qualify for annual memberships, where the e-bike per-minute fee is reduced to 0.

=== Corporate and Student Discounts ===
Employees of registered companies or students and faculty members from registered schools can receive a 20% discount to their membership rates.

== Bikes ==
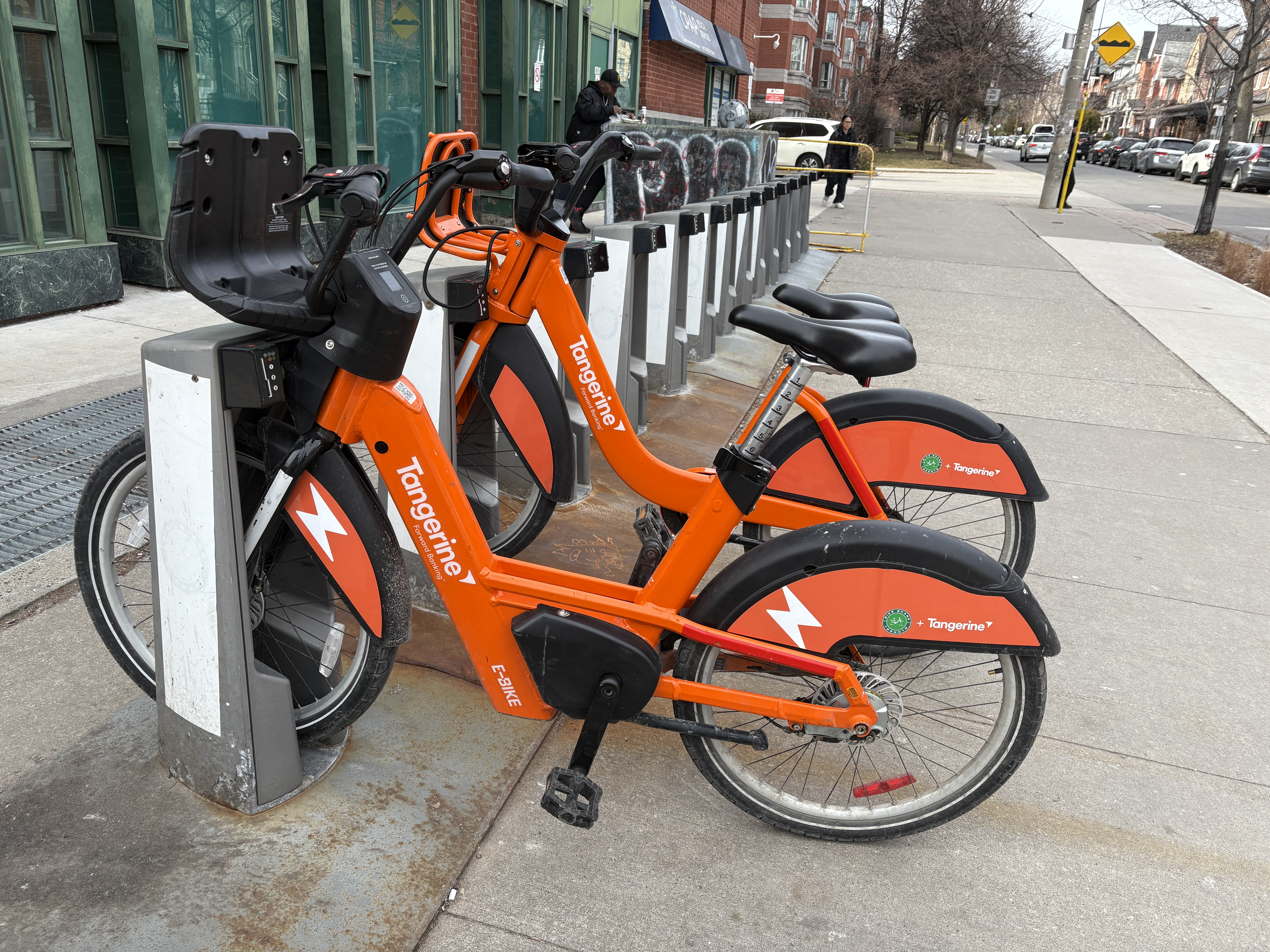
Bike Share Toronto "E-fit" model with "Iconic" model at a docking station

The bicycles are utility bicycles; they have a step-through frame with an upright seating position. They are equipped with internal hub gears, drum brakes, fenders, chain guard, generator lights, and a front rack. The conventional bikes are PBSC's "Iconic" model.

Starting in 2020, PBSC's "E-fit" e-bikes were introduced into the system through a pilot project. All the bikes have been configured with three-speed hubs. The e-bike rollout started with 300 pedal-assist electronic bikes. By 2024, there were 1600 e-bikes in the system. In 2025, 500 more e-bikes were added. "Next Generation Astro" e-bikes were introduced into the system in 2026. These bikes are single speed, with 24" wheels. They include phone holders, and a new basket design.

== Mobile apps ==
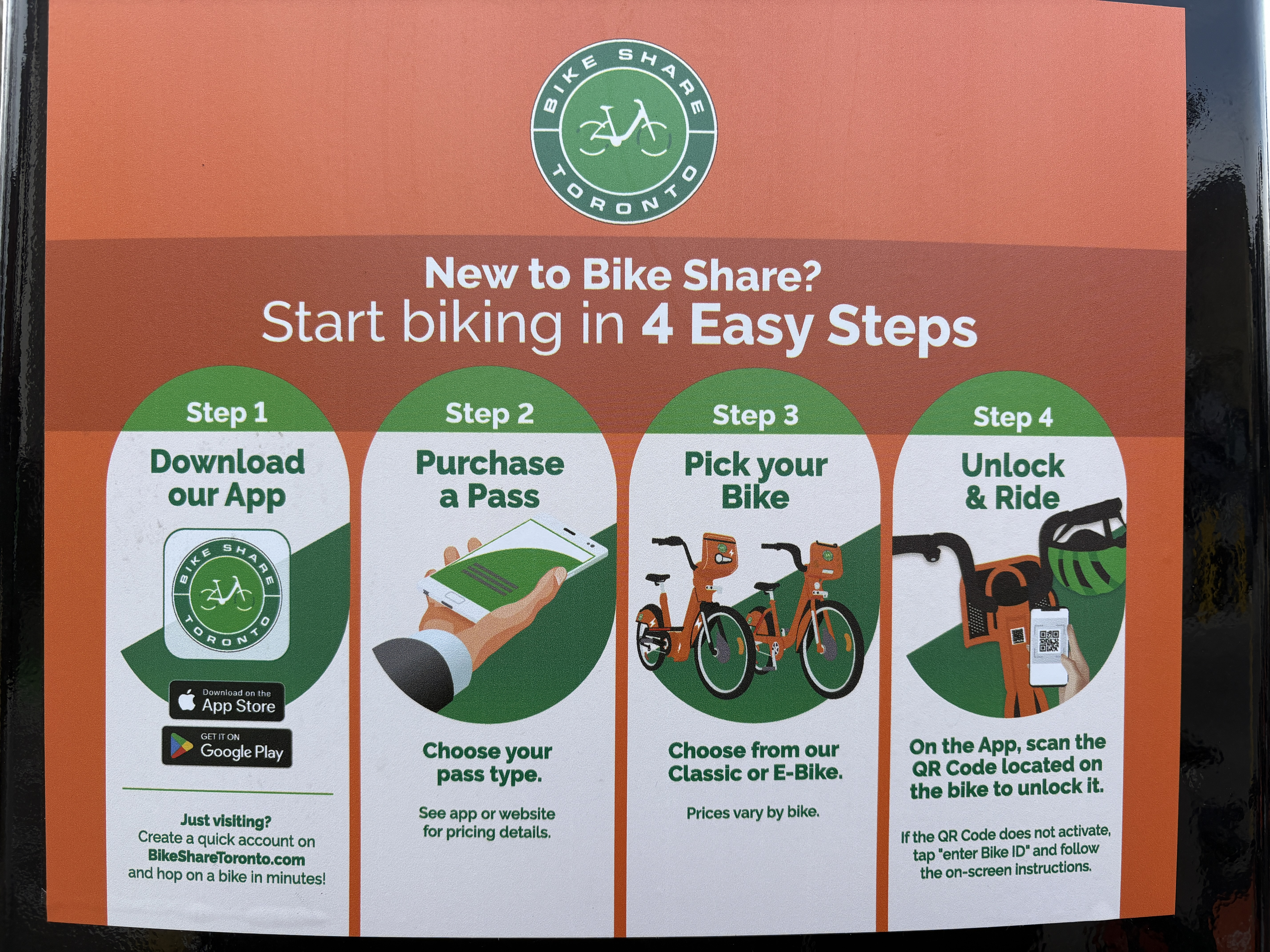
Sign on kiosk telling users to download app to ride

A mobile app can be used to rent bikes, instead of using the payment kiosk at stations. Until 2024, the officially-recommended mobile app was the "PBSC" app (formerly named "CycleFinder"). A competing app, called Transit, also works.

In 2024, Bike Share Toronto announced a new official app, simply titled "Bike Share Toronto," developed by Lyft Urban Solutions. The app includes a map of Toronto's bike lane network, along with filters for showing which stations have bikes, electric bikes, and docks available. It also includes a page where riders can view their past rides and ridership stats.

== Sponsorship and Promotions ==
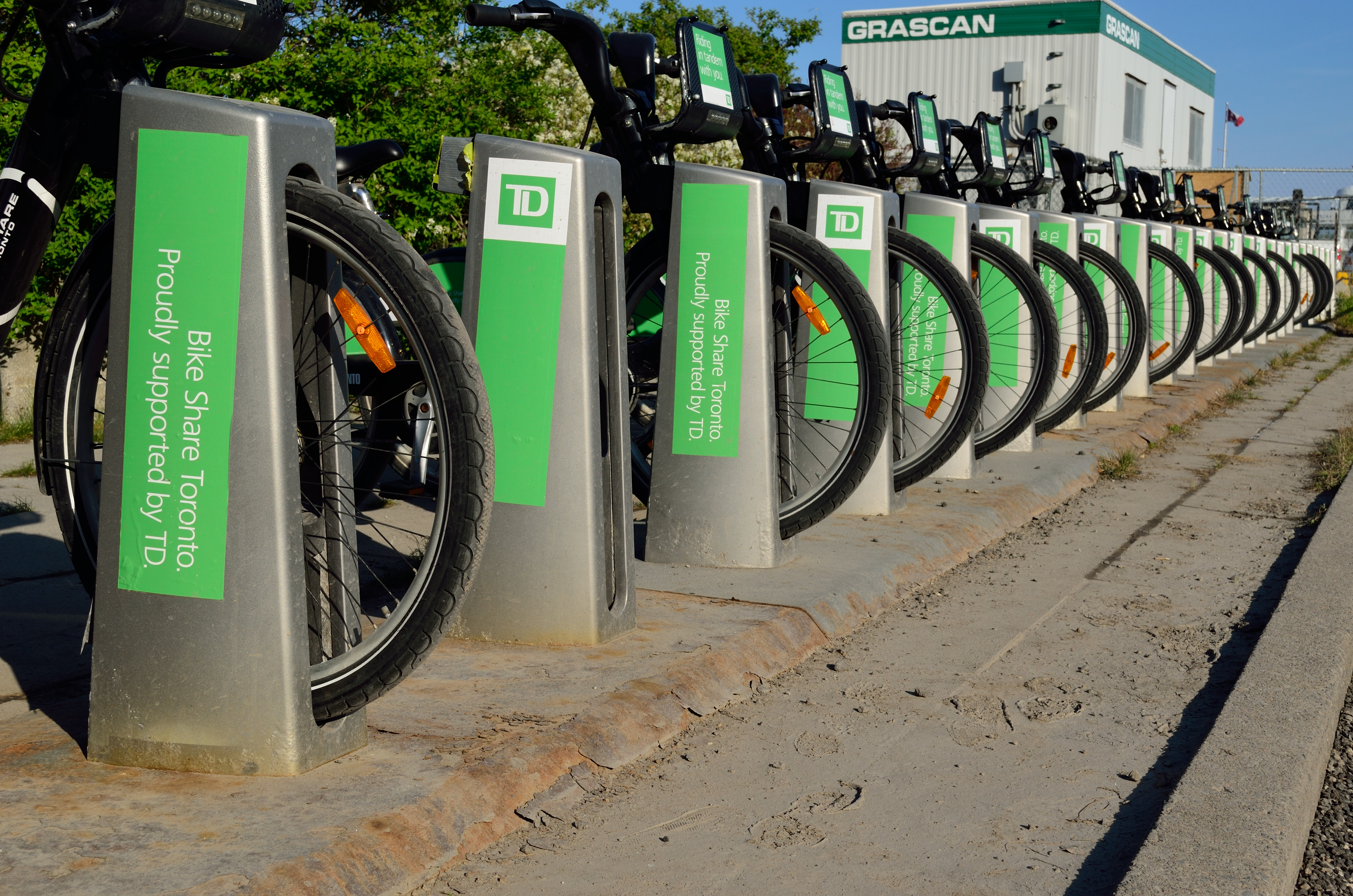
TD logos on bike racks

Between late 2014 and 2016, TD Canada Trust sponsored Toronto Bike Share, covering "all operating costs" at a cost of $750,000 a year. This sponsorship was not renewed. In 2020, the TPA signed a 3-year deal with Bell Media (Astral) for advertising rights at stations. The TPA also stated that they were investigating the potential of a systemwide corporate sponsor, similar to other systems like Santander Cycles in London.

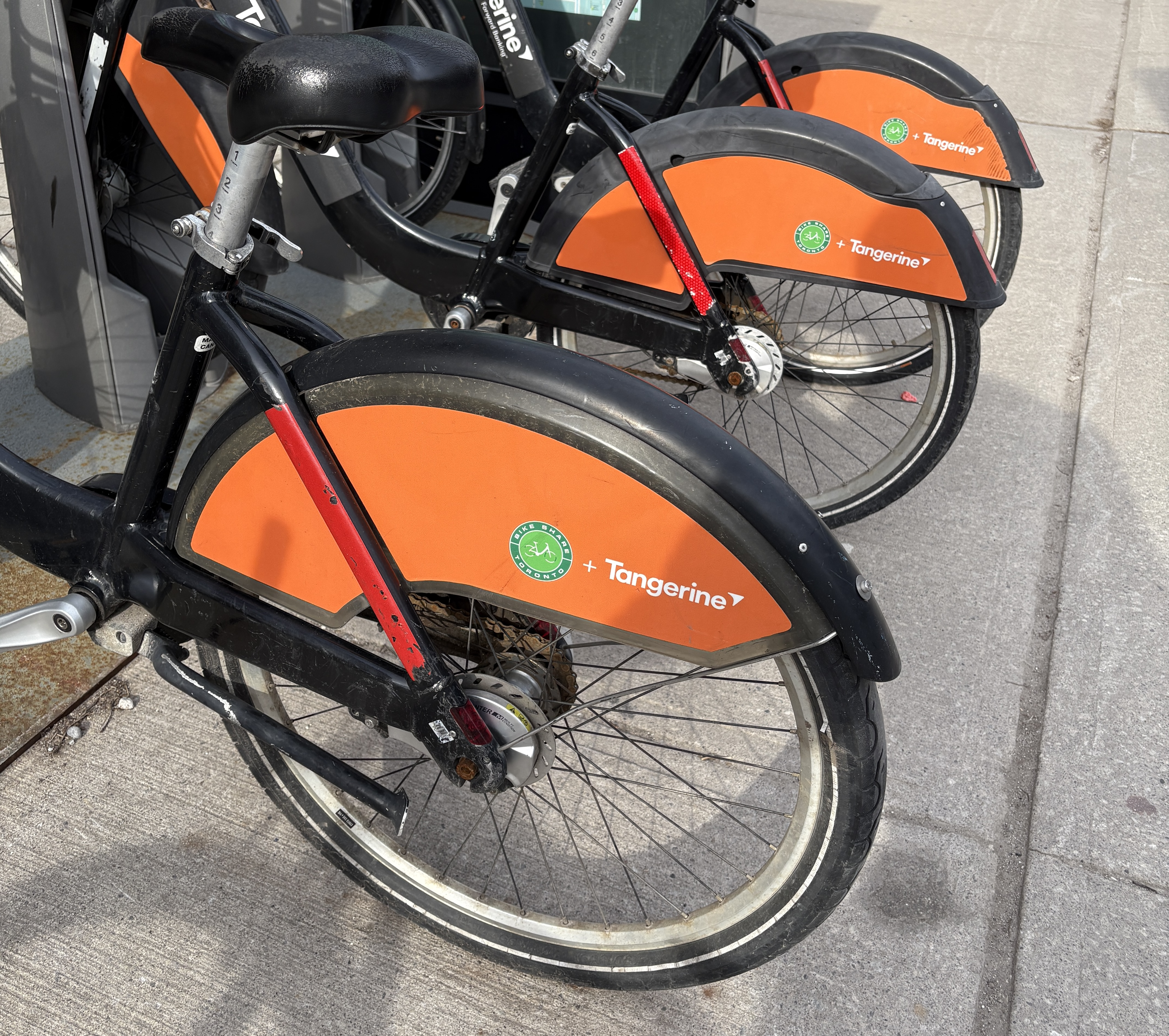
"Iconic" bikes with Tangerine Bank branding

In May 2023, it was announced that Tangerine Bank had signed a five year sponsorship agreement with Bike Share Toronto. This would help fund initiatives included in a 4-year growth plan, with Tangerine Bank customers receiving rewards for using the system.

=== Free Ride Wednesdays ===
In June 2017, Toronto Mayor John Tory announced a "Free Ride Wednesdays" program, which allowed anyone to take free trips of up to 30 minutes on every Wednesday in July 2017. There were no limits to the number of trips per day. Fees applied only if any one single trip exceeded 30 minutes. Free Ride Wednesdays were also held in June 2018 and August 2019. Afterwards, Bike Share Toronto signed a multi-year sponsorship agreement with CAA in order to cover future Free Ride Wednesdays.

== See also ==
- Cycling in Toronto
