= G. Jason Bergenske =

American businessman (born 1985)

- Born: Gary Jason Bergenske; September 10, 1985 (age 39); Winter Park, Florida, US
- Occupation: Businessman
- Awards: Forbes magazine Young Entrepreneur 2010; Inc. (magazine) 2023 Inc. (magazine) 2024

Gary "Jason" Bergenske (born September 10, 1985) is an American businessman. In 2006, he founded the company Bergenske Enterprises, Inc. of which he is the president and chief executive officer.

In 2010, Bergenske was featured in Forbes magazine.

== Bergenske Enterprises, Inc. ==
Bergenske Enterprises, Inc. is a company headquartered in Winter Park, Florida of which G. Jason Bergenske currently holds as the president and chief executive officer while owning 100% of the corporations shares. Bergenske Enterprises, Inc. is best known for the ownership of the national company The Barter Network, as The Barter Network was opened as a private company in 2006 by Bergenske Enterprises, Inc. but then later sold to Equitrade international in 2016. Bergenske Enterprises, Inc. is best known now for the ownership of the national company MoveitPro™ Software.

== MoveitPro Software ==
Bergenske in 2011 began developing MoveitPro Software, which was under development for four years prior to being released for sale. MoveitPro Software has now become the leading software for moving and storage companies in the United States.

In November 2022, Jason Bergenske was featured on "The SaaS Podcast" as a guest of Omer Khan. In this he reveals how the company MoveitPro Software has now surpassed over $5m in ARR (Annual Recurring Revenue) and still growing.

In 2023 MoveitPro Software was recognized as No. 3314 of the fastest growing companies in the entire United States by the Inc.5000. https://www.inc.com/profile/moveitpro-software

In 2024 MoveitPro Software was recognized as No.159 of the fastest growing companies in the southeast United States by the Inc. Regionals https://www.inc.com/profile/moveitpro-software

== The Barter Network ==
Bergenske opened The Barter Network from his existing headquarters for Timeless Productions in June 2006. In March 2007, The Barter Network moved to its own stand-alone office building located in Winter Park, Florida. On July 1, 2010, Bergenske reported that the company reached the 700 member mark. In December 2016, The Barter Network was sold to Equitrade International headquartered in Atlanta, Georgia.
