= Toronto Donut Ride =

The Donut Ride is an informal Toronto road cycling tour run every Saturday and Sunday, as well as public holidays. Typical summer numbers range from 100 to 125 riders forming a large pack, and weather permitting, the ride continues year-round and often sees a dozen riders even in mid-winter. The ride is known for being fairly fast paced, often reaching speeds of about 50 kilometres per hour (31 mph) on straightaways. It is also known for being fairly unforgiving; riders who are dropped from the pack are on their own.

== History ==
The tour was first organized in 1976 as the team ride of the Scarborough Cycling Club, affiliated with a bike store in Scarborough, two of the primary organizers being Roger Keiley and Barry Hastings. As the ride grew in popularity it moved to a new starting point more centralized in Toronto, although still somewhat east of the core. It remained associated with a bike store for some time, and was insured by the Ontario Cycling Association. A serious accident in the 1990s led to the entire group being sued, and since then the ride is completely unofficial. Although the ride often took place four times a week during the summers of the mid-1990s (including an extended 160 km run up to the Holland Marsh—the "Marsh Ride"—on Wednesdays), it is now primarily a weekend and holiday affair.

Over the years the ride has hosted many notable Canadian cyclists, including legendary Toronto guru Mike Barry and his son Michael Barry (of US Postal, T-Mobile, and Columbia, Sky), Jocelyn Lovell, the Hansen Brothers, and others.

Local cyclists and filmmakers Aryeh Smith and Stephane Marcotte collaborated to develop a documentary about The Donut Ride in 2007.

== Ride route ==
The current route starts at 9AM at the corner of Eglinton and Laird, in the parking lot of a former donut shop – hence the ride's name (currently Tim Hortons on north west corner). Only a small number of the eventual pack starts at the shop, however, with riders joining all along the route, notably from a church just past the starting point, and from the bridge carrying Eglinton Avenue over Bayview Avenue.

The tempo is easy early on, with riders chatting as the pack heads north and out of the city. The normal route follows Bayview northward to Sheppard Avenue. The ride winds through a number of smaller streets before turning onto Bathurst for a short period and then around a ramp onto Highway 7, a major six-lane highway, where the talking stops as the tempo picks up rather dramatically. The main high-speed portion continues from here across to Langstaff Road and then heading north on Keele St. Here the pack fragments, as the cross wind and rolling hills on Keele take their toll. Usually riders in the front group sprint for a line which is painted on the road on the outskirts of King City.

Several routes branch off from here, including a shorter 87 km route across King Road, a middle distance route along Bloomington Road, and a longer and much more challenging hillier route further north on Keele and back on Dufferin. There are six traditional routes from 83 km to 122 km. The ride meets up again after turning east to Yonge Street for a stop at Gramma's Oven, a small Polish bakery just south of King Road in Oak Ridges.

After the stop, at around 11:00am, the ride continues eastward with several additional return routes centered on either Kennedy Leslie St./Don Mills Rd. The return portion of the ride starts slow, but is followed by a higher speed section culminating in a sprint at 60+ km/h on Leslie just north of Major Mackenzie and a sprint on Kennedy just north of Unionville. The ride slows as it reaches the northern end of the city and the traffic signals once again become an issue. Oddly, the ride does not end at the starting point, but a location only a kilometer away to the southwest. Most riders have already split off from the main peloton by this point, though, making their way home by the shortest route once the main portion of the ride is over.

Route Maps

- Short Route
- Medium Route
- Long Route

== Tips for riders ==
- The group passes by the Bayview subway station on the Sheppard Line at about 9:15am.
- Many riders from the north meet at the Petro Canada at Yonge and Crestwood Rd. The ride picks them up about 9:30am.
- A final group, mostly from the western side of the city, joins at the corner of Langstaff (old Highway 7) and Keele, at about 9:45am.
- In-city speeds are fairly low, but as the pack builds it becomes large enough to essentially ignore traffic signals and settle into a steady mid-30s.
- Once the ride exits the city around Highway 7, the speed quickly picks up into the high 40s.
- The pack normally starts to split up on Keele St, where a series of rolling hills drops the weaker riders, who form their own packs to continue. It's easier to hang in with the group on the return portion of the ride, which is downhill and frequently has a tailwind – allowing the peloton to attain speeds of 45–55 km/h.

== See also ==
- Donut Ride Toronto website
- Cycling in Toronto
- Toronto Bicycling Network
