= Cycle Toronto =

- Established: 2008; Toronto, Ontario
- Type: Charity
- Purpose: Cycling advocacy
- Location: Centre for Social Innovation, 192 Spadina Ave, Office 215, Toronto, Ontario, M5T 2C2, Canada
- Region served: Toronto
- Members: 3000 (2018)
- Key people: Michael Longfield, Executive Director; Ashley Quan, President, Board of Directors
- Staff: 5
- Volunteers: 100 regular volunteers, 100 others
- Website: Cycle Toronto
- Formerly called: Toronto Cyclists Union until 2012

Cycle Toronto is a Canadian cycling advocacy and charity organization based in Toronto, Ontario. Founded in 2008 as the Toronto Cyclists Union, the group adopted its current name in 2012 and became a registered charity in 2021. Cycle Toronto host public education and safety workshops, organizes cycling events, and publishes the Toronto Cycling Handbook.

== History ==
A number of cycling activists had talked about starting an advocacy and lobbying organization for Toronto over the years, similar to the Active Transportation Alliance in Chicago or Transportation Alternatives in New York City. In 2007, David Meslin did a research trip of cycling advocacy organizations across North America and returned with a presentation. Toronto cycling activists soon began the organizing work of forming the Toronto Cyclists Union, a membership-based cycling advocacy group, which launched as the Toronto Cyclists Union in 2008.

At the organization's 2012 annual general meeting (AGM), members voted in favour of a motion put forward by the Board of Directors to change the name of the organization to Cycle Toronto.

In April 2021, Cycle Toronto announced that they had become a charity.

Year	Members	Annual Report
2008	374	
2009	513	
2010	1049	link
2011	1863	link
2012	2276	link
2013	2253	link
2014	2865	link
2015	3054	link
2016	2500	link
2017	3000	link
2018	3000	link
2019		link
2024		link

== See also ==
- Advocacy for Respect for Cyclists
- Cycling in Toronto
- Toronto Bicycling Network
