= Community Bicycle Network =

- Company type: Nonprofit
- Industry: Cycling
- Founded: 1993; Toronto, Ontario
- Defunct: 2017
- Headquarters: 761 Queen Street West, Toronto, Ontario, Canada
- Area served: Central Toronto
- Key people: Sherri Byer, Coordinator; Herb van den Dool, President
- Number of employees: Approx. 4 (+20 regular volunteers, 50 others)
- Website: Official Site

The Community Bicycle Network (CBN) existed to provide a network for bike recycling clubs and other community economic development projects in Toronto. It was founded in 1993 and closed down in 2017.

== Non-profit Bike Shop ==
CBN operated as a bicycle cooperative much like similar organizations like Bikes Not Bombs in Massachusetts and Our Community Bikes in Vancouver, BC. Its for-profit operations helped to support other non-profit projects in the community. The main activity of the bike shop was to collect donated bikes from individuals, condominiums, small business and the City of Toronto, and refurbish the bikes for resale. CBN also offered up the space for individuals to rent tools and fix their bikes with mechanic help. CBN's bike mechanic workshops were popular, with courses offered throughout the year and for specific topics. Other services CBN offered include bike and trailer rentals.

== History ==
CBN underwent a number of transitions throughout its history. It started out as a network of bike recycling clubs and a location to house such organizations as Transportation Options and the Latin American Bike Club. Over time most of the bike clubs folded and some of the other organizations either spun off to become independent or folded themselves. CBN transitioned to host Bikeshare as its main operation. CBN was popularly known for the Bikeshare program that functioned as a bicycle-lending library across Central Toronto with 16 hubs from 2001 to 2006. For its time it was North America's largest and most popular bike-sharing program with 150 bikes, 16 hubs and 400 active members. Bikeshare, however, failed to gain long-term financial support from private or government funders despite much effort. In 2006 Bikeshare was shelved. It was at this point that CBN transitioned to a non-profit bike shop while still maintaining a focus on its mission of refurbishing bikes and providing bike education to the community. At the end of 2017, CBN officially closed down.
