= The Barter Network =

- Company type: Private Company
- Industry: Barter & Alternative currency
- Founded: 2006
- Headquarters: Winter Park, Florida, United States
- Key people: G. Jason Bergenske, President & CEO
- Products: Financial services
- Revenue: ▲US $4.2 Million (2010)
- Website: www.TheBarterNetwork.net

The Barter Network is a commercial trading network of companies in the United States founded in 2006 by Bergenske Enterprises, Inc. of which G. Jason Bergenske, President and CEO owns 100% of the corporation's shares. The Barter Network has expanded to include over 700 companies, which trade with one another using a medium of exchange known as a trade dollar.

== Operation ==
Upon joining the TBN network, members agree to accept TBN Trade Dollars, instead of USD legal tender, when they sell to another TBN member. Trade dollars are electronically transferred—via telephone or internet—by the seller from the buyer’s trade dollar account. Members of The Barter Network (TBN) also agree to offer their goods and services at the same prices they charge in cash transactions.

== History ==
The Barter Network originally opened its doors in 2006 in Sanford, Florida just outside Orlando. In November 2007 they outgrew their offices and moved to Winter Park, Florida.

== Corporate governance ==
- G. Jason Bergenske, Chief Executive Officer

== Growth ==
Their trade volume for 2006 was $786K.
Their trade volume for 2007 was $1.06 million in 2007.
Their trade volume for 2008 was $1.8 million, an increase of 58% over $1.06 million in 2007.
Their trade volume for 2009 was $2.7 million
Their trade volume for 2010 was $4.2 million.

== Tax implications ==
In the United States, it is generally not possible to avoid income taxes by bartering one's services. According to the IRS, "The fair market value of goods and services exchanged must be included in the income of both parties." The barter in many cases must be reported on Form 1099-B and Schedule C.

== Industry associations ==
- International Drive Chamber of Commerce.
- Central Florida International Chamber of Commerce
- World Connect Chamber of Commerce

== See also ==
- List of international trade topics
- Local currency
- Local Exchange Trading System
- Natural economy
- Private currency
