= Toronto Parking Authority =

Canadian municipal parking services company

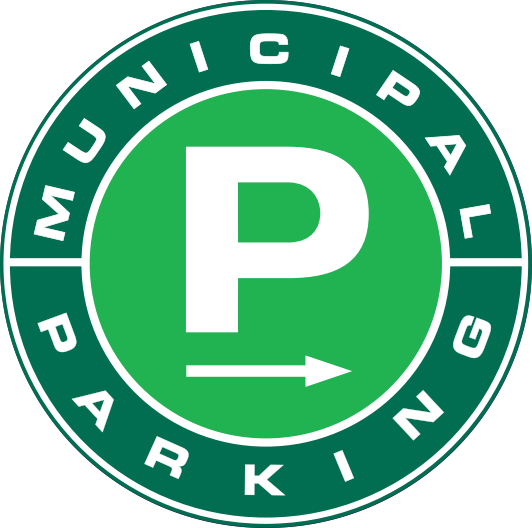
- Type: Municipally owned corporation
- Industry: Parking
- Predecessor: Parking Authority of Toronto
- Founded: 1998
- Headquarters: 33 Queen Street East, Toronto, Ontario, Canada
- Key people: Hartley Lefton (Chair)
- Services: Parking lots, bicycle sharing
- Owner: City of Toronto
- Divisions: Bike Share Toronto
- Website: greenp.com

The Toronto Parking Authority (TPA), commonly known as Green P for its green-colour branding, is a municipal parking services company owned by the City of Toronto. The TPA was established in 1998 with the merger of parking operations in the area of the former Metropolitan Toronto. A municipal parking authority in the pre-amalgamation City of Toronto was first set up in 1952, taking over management of parking from the police.

The TPA operates off-street parking lots and parking garages, on-street metered parking, and Toronto's bicycle-sharing system, named Bike Share Toronto. It is one of the largest operators of municipal parking services in North America and is 100% self-sustaining through parking user fees and other sources, returning 75% of its annual net operating income to the City of Toronto, totaling $1.5 billion since 1992.

== Operations ==
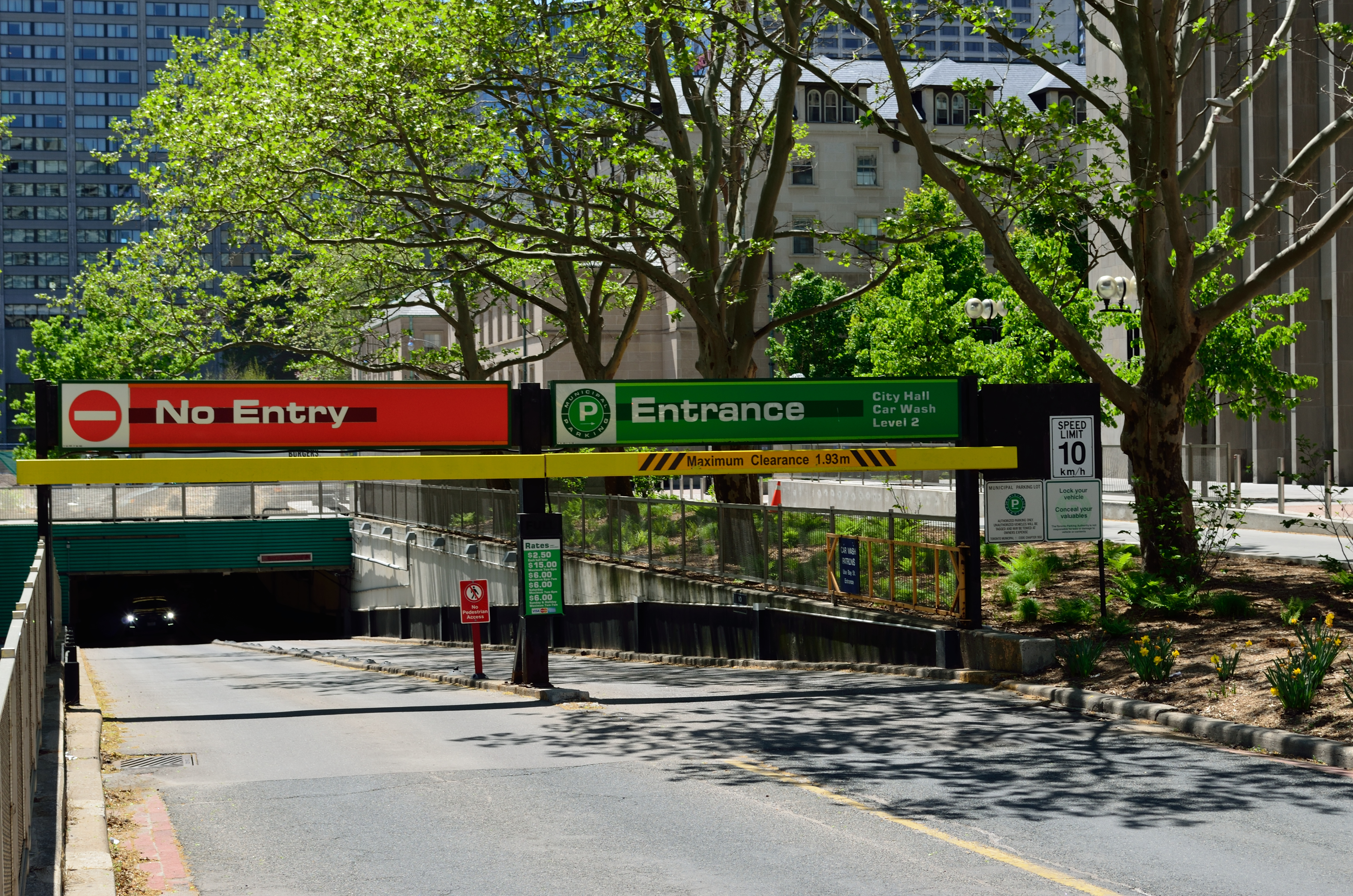
Entrance to the Toronto City Hall garage under Nathan Phillips Square

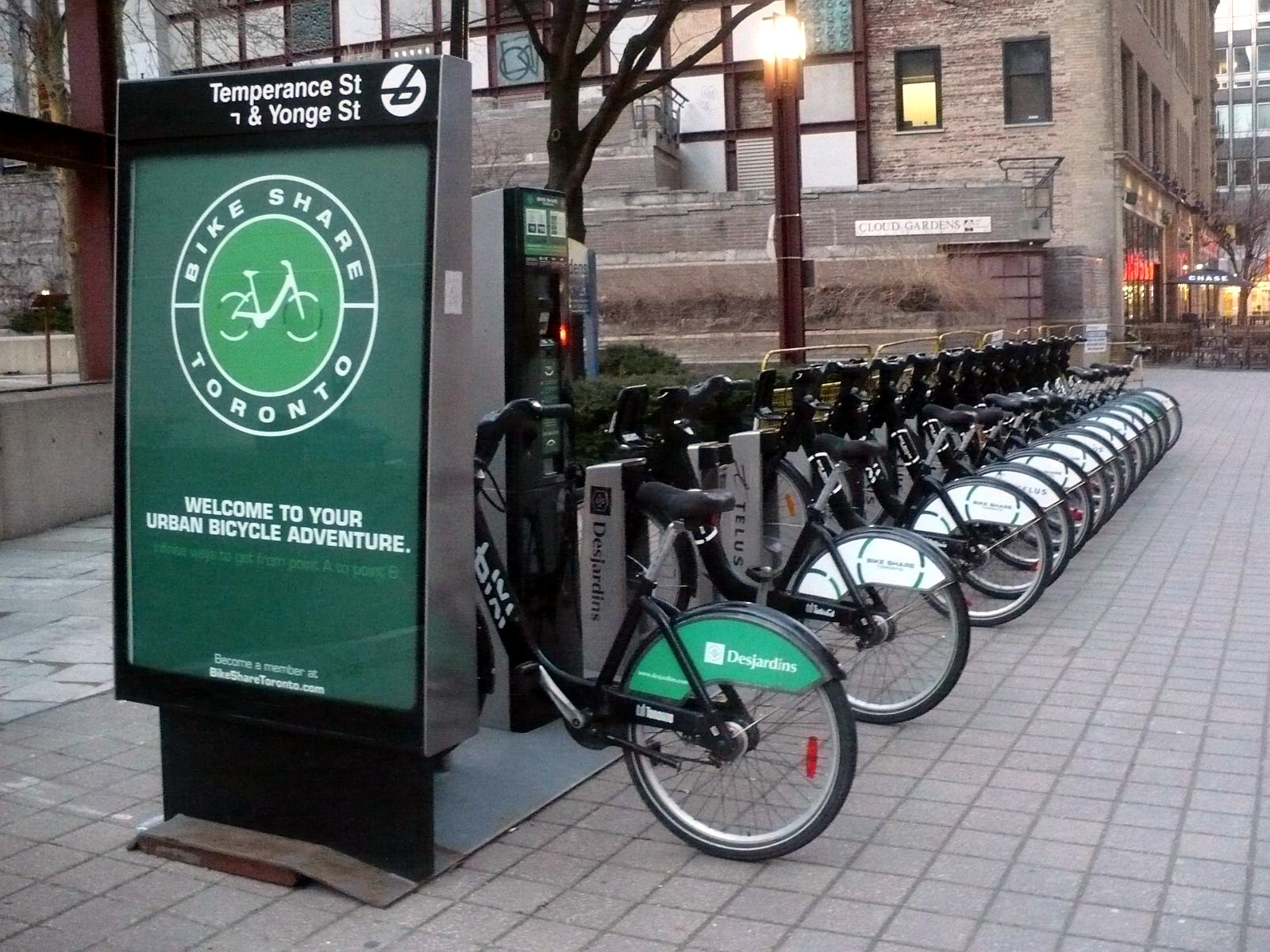
A Bike Share Toronto station

The TPA operates around 59,000 parking spaces divided into 3 categories – off-street parking lots and garages, on-street metered parking, and joint venture managed lots across Toronto.

21,000 of these spaces are located in over 300 off-street parking lots and garages, with the largest parking garage being the 2,027 space Toronto City Hall underground parking garage at Nathan Phillips Square. Parking lots that are operated by the Toronto Parking Authority are marked by green signs with their signature P in the middle, hence the name 'Green P' parking.

The TPA also manages and operates parking facilities under contract for the Toronto Transit Commission, with around 13,000 spaces located at 17 TTC stations, including at Pioneer Village and Highway 407 stations in the City of Vaughan (making them the only TPA facilities outside Toronto), although the lots at Vaughan Metropolitan Centre station are privately operated. The largest TTC parking lot is the combined parking lot for Finch Station, with over 3,200 spaces.

The TPA operates and maintains Toronto's bicycle-sharing system, which is known as Bike Share Toronto. The TPA took over from Public Bike System Company (PBSC) in 2013, when they ran into financial difficulties. Since then, ridership has grown exponentially with the system now covering 200 square kilometres (80 square miles) of the Greater Toronto Area with 6,850 bikes at 625 stations and 12,000 docking points.

== Enforcement ==
Enforcement of parking rules in TPA's lots is carried out by TPA's own parking enforcement officers. Customers who fail to pay, or who park for longer than the amount of time that they purchased, may be issued an official police tag for each parking violation.

== See also ==
- Bike Share Toronto – bike-sharing program run by TPA
