= Toronto Coalition for Active Transportation =

The Centre for Active Transportation
- Company type: Nonprofit
- Industry: Active transportation: Cycling and Pedestrians
- Founded: 2006; Toronto, Ontario
- Headquarters: Toronto, Ontario, Canada
- Area served: Toronto
- Key people: Nancy Smith Lea, Director
- Number of employees: 6
- Website: Official Site

The Centre for Active Transportation (TCAT) was originally formed in 2006 as "Toronto Coalition for Active Transportation". The organization was renamed in 2011. The TCAT plan for active transportation emerged from consultation with environmental, health and transportation groups from across Toronto.

== Activities ==
TCAT's work includes conducting active transportation research, developing resources, and offering programming.

TCAT's activities include the Bike Summit conferences (2008, 2009), the Complete Streets Forums (2010–2015), a series of Complete Streets research publications (2012–2015), the Complete Streets game (2013, 2018), the "Bike Lanes, On-Street Parking and Business" economic impact reports (2009–2017), launching the Scarborough Cycles community bicycle hub (2015–2019), and the development of several community portraits and participatory plans as part of the Active Neighbourhoods Canada partnership (2013–2020).
