= Toronto Bicycling Network =

- Company type: Club
- Industry: Cycling
- Founded: 1983; Toronto, Ontario
- Headquarters: Toronto, Ontario, Canada
- Area served: Greater Toronto
- Number of employees: 0
- Website: Official Site

The Toronto Bicycling Network (TBN) is Toronto's largest recreational cycling organization. It was formed in 1983 by cycling enthusiasts Richard Aaron and Norm Myshok. By 1998, the TBN had grown to almost 800 members.

== See also ==
- Cycling in Toronto
- Toronto Donut Ride
