= U.S. Bicycle Route 30 =

Long-distance bicycle route in the United States

U.S. Bicycle Route 30

Route information
- Length: 628.57 mi (1,011.59 km)
- Existed: 2018–present

North Dakota section
- Length: 87.470 mi (140.769 km)
- West end: US 12 at the Montana-North Dakota state line near Marmarth, ND
- East end: US 12 at the South Dakota state line

Wisconsin section
- Length: 269 mi (433 km)
- West end: USBR 45, Mississippi River Trail at the Minnesota state line near Bluff Siding, WI
- East end: Lake Express Terminal, Milwaukee, WI

Ohio-Pennsylvania section
- Length: 272.1 mi (437.9 km)
- West end: USBR 25 Michigan state line at Toledo, OH
- Major intersections: USBR 25 in Toledo, OH; USBR 21 in Cleveland, OH
- East end: State Bicycle Route 517 at the New York state line near Ripley, NY

Location
- Country: United States
- States: North Dakota, Wisconsin, Ohio, Pennsylvania

Highway system
- United States Bicycle Route System; List
| ← USBR 23 | USBR 35 → |

U.S. Bicycle Route 30 (USBR 30) is an east–west U.S. Bicycle Route. As of August 2021, it consists of three segments, running though North Dakota, Wisconsin, Ohio, and Pennsylvania in the United States.

== Description ==
Lengths
| | mi | km |
|---|---|---|
| ND | 87.470 | 141 |
| WI | 269 | 433 |
| OH | 225.6 | 363 |
| PA | 46.5 | 75 |
| Total | 628.57 | 1,012 |

The western segment of USBR 30 follows U.S. Route 12 and the historic Yellowstone Trail through the southwesternmost corner of the North Dakota for about 87 miles (140 km) running between the state lines with Montana and South Dakota. The middle segment runs across Wisconsin for 269 miles (433 km) from the Mississippi River near Winona, Minnesota, to the Lake Express ferry terminal in Milwaukee, where it will eventually cross Lake Michigan to Muskegon, Michigan. It consists of the Hank Aaron State Trail, Glacial Drumlin State Trail, Capital City State Trail, 400 State Trail, Elroy-Sparta State Trail, La Crosse River State Trail, Great River State Trail, New Berlin Trail, and the Oak Leaf Trail. The eastern segment follows the North Coast Inland Trail and local roads across northern Ohio and BikePA Route Z across Pennsylvania's Erie Triangle along the coast of Lake Erie. When fully complete, USBR 30 is expected to run across much of the country running from New Hampshire's Seacoast at USBR 1, incorporating a ferry crossing across Lake Michigan to a future junction with USBR 76 near West Yellowstone, Montana, running through New Hampshire, Vermont, New York, Pennsylvania, Ohio, Michigan, Wisconsin, Minnesota, South Dakota, North Dakota, and Montana along the way.

== History ==
USBR 30 was first designated by the American Association of State Highway and Transportation Officials (AASHTO) in September 2018 along BikePA Route Z in Pennsylvania. In the fall of 2020, AASHTO designated the segment in Wisconsin, which runs from the Mississippi River at the Minnesota state line to Lake Michigan in Milwaukee. A few months later, AASHTO designated the portion in North Dakota, following the historic Yellowstone Trail, a historic auto trail that once connected Plymouth, Massachusetts, and Seattle by road with Yellowstone National Park. In May 2021, the eastern section was extended across northern Ohio to the Michigan state line.

== Auxiliary routes ==
=== USBR 230 (Wisconsin) ===
U.S. Bicycle Route 230
- Location: Rock Springs–Dane County, WI
- Existed: 2020–present

USBR 230 is a loop off USBR 30 in Wisconsin. It provides a non-ferry alternative to the Merrimac Ferry on its parent route when it is not in operation.

=== USBR 230 (Ohio) ===
U.S. Bicycle Route 230
- Location: Fremont–Rocky River, OH
- Length: 78.1 mi (125.7 km)
- Existed: 2021–present

USBR 230 is a spur off USBR 30 along the southern shore of Lake Erie in Ohio.
