= United States Bicycle Route System =

US national cycling route network

- 1978, 2009, and 2023 route markers

System information
- Length: 18,953 mi (30,502 km)
- Formed: 1978

Highway names
- US Routes: U.S. Bicycle Route nn (USBR nn)

System links
- United States Bicycle Route System; List

The United States Bicycle Route System (abbreviated USBRS) is the national cycling route network of the United States. It consists of interstate long-distance cycling routes that use multiple types of bicycling infrastructure, including off-road paths, bicycle lanes, and low-traffic roads. As with the complementary United States Numbered Highways system for motorists, each U.S. Bicycle Route is maintained by state and local governments. The USBRS is intended to eventually traverse the entire country, like the Dutch National Cycle Routes and the United Kingdom's National Cycle Network, yet at a scale similar to the EuroVelo network that spans Europe.

The USBRS was established in 1978 by the American Association of State Highway and Transportation Officials (AASHTO), the same body that coordinates the numbering of Interstate highways and U.S. Routes. The first two U.S. Bicycle Routes were established in 1982 and remained the only two until 2011. Steady growth and interest in the system has followed since. As of November 2022, 29 parent routes and 24 child routes extend 18,953 miles (30,502 km) across 34 states and the District of Columbia. The system, once fully connected, is projected to encompass over 50,000 miles (80,000 km) of bike routes.

== Layout ==
Like United States Numbered Highways and many national routing systems, the U.S. Bicycle Route system is designed to roughly follow a grid. Mainline routes are the major cross-country routes and are represented with one- or two-digit numbers. Even-numbered routes are planned to primarily run east–west, with low-numbered routes in the north and high-numbered routes in the south. Odd-numbered routes will primarily run north–south, with low-numbered routes starting in the east and ascending in number toward the west. Three-digit numbers are assigned to auxiliary routes, with the last two digits denoting the parent that the auxiliary connects to. Much like other routing systems, the grid is sometimes violated; for example, U.S. Bicycle Route 76 (USBR 76) is projected to turn to the north in Colorado and end in Oregon as opposed to California, south of (and temporarily concurrent with) USBR 20 but far north of USBR 50. As with auxiliary Interstate Highways, two distinct U.S. Bicycle Routes in two different states along the same mainline route may share the same three-digit number without any plan to connect the routes. The first example of this repetition occurred in 2021 with the approval of USBR 230 in Ohio, which is not intended to connect to an existing USBR 230 in Wisconsin.

The existing USBR 1 will be the easternmost route, though USBR 5 will run farther east of it in Virginia and the Carolinas. The westernmost and northernmost routes are USBR 97 and USBR 8, respectively, both of which are in the state of Alaska, but USBR 97 also enters Washington. Outside of Alaska, the westernmost route is expected to be USBR 95 and the northernmost USBR 8. USBR 90 is expected to be the southernmost route. Despite the analogy the system has to the U.S. Highway system, the USBRS's route numbers do not necessarily trace the same route as the corresponding U.S. Highway number; for example, while USBR 1 will run close to the East Coast and thus parallel U.S. Route 1 (US 1), the projected route of USBR 10 generally follows US 2.

In order for a route to qualify as a U.S. Bike Route, it needs to connect two or more states, connect multiple U.S. Bike Routes, or connect a U.S. Bike Route with a national border.

== History ==
The USBRS was established in 1978 by AASHTO for the purpose of "facilitat[ing] travel between the states over routes which have been identified as being more suitable than others for cycling."

The first routes were defined in 1982: U.S. Bicycle Route 1 (USBR 1) from North Carolina to Virginia, and the stretch of USBR 76 from Illinois through Kentucky to Virginia. These two routes remained the only routes in the system until 2011. In the interim, only minor routing changes had been made in Virginia.

AASHTO established a new task force in 2003 to study expansion of the system. The task force included state and federal highway officials and representatives from bicycling organizations. In October 2008, AASHTO approved a national-level corridor and route designation plan. Other organizations involved in the effort include state departments of transportation, the Federal Highway Administration (FHWA), and the Adventure Cycling Association.

In 2009, the U.S. House of Representatives proposed moving the U.S. Bicycle Route System under the authority of the FHWA as part of a new Office of Livability. In 2009, the FHWA published a new edition of the Manual on Uniform Traffic Control Devices that introduces a revised U.S. Bicycle Route shield. Compared to the 2003 edition, the new design swaps the bicycle symbol and route number.

In early May 2011, the first major expansion of the system was made. Five new parent routes, two child routes, and one alternate route were created, along with modifications to the existing routes in Virginia and the establishment of USBR 1 in New England.

- U.S. Bicycle Route 1 now has an additional run from the state of Maine to New Hampshire.
- U.S. Bicycle Route 1A is a sea-side alternate route for USBR 1 in Maine.
- U.S. Bicycle Route 8 runs from Fairbanks, Alaska, along the Alaska Highway, to the Canadian border.
- U.S. Bicycle Route 108 runs from its parent route in Tok, Alaska, to Anchorage.
- U.S. Bicycle Route 208 follows the Haines Highway from the Alaska Marine Highway terminal in Haines to the Canadian border.
- U.S. Bicycle Route 20 runs from the St. Clair River through the state of Michigan to Lake Michigan.
- U.S. Bicycle Route 87 follows the Klondike Highway from the Alaska Marine Highway terminal in Skagway to the Canadian border.
- U.S. Bicycle Route 95 follows the Richardson Highway from Delta Junction, Alaska to the Alaska Marine Highway terminal in Valdez.
- U.S. Bicycle Route 97 is entirely within Alaska, and it runs from Fairbanks, through Anchorage, to Seward.

In 2012, the FHWA approved the use of an alternative U.S. Bicycle Route marker design on an interim basis. The alternative design departs from the longstanding "acorn" shape in favor of a Reuleaux triangle placed over a green background. The FHWA gave 17 states interim approval to use the alternative design before formally incorporating it into the Manual on Uniform Traffic Control Devices in 2023.

Across 2013, several other additions to the system were made. After approval in 2012, signage for USBR 45 in Minnesota was completed in the summer. An expansion of USBR 76 into Missouri was signed in October, and both Tennessee and Maryland entered the system on November 5 with USBR 23 and USBR 50, respectively. Florida has also begun planning on four bicycle routes, including its stretch of USBR 1 and USBR 90.

== List of routes ==
As of November 2022, there are 31 official parent routes in varying stages of completion. In areas where a specific route has not been approved by AASHTO, there is only a prioritized corridor. The 24 existing subsidiary and alternate routes are grouped with their one- or two-digit parents. Approved or signposted routes are located in the District of Columbia and 33 states: Alaska, Arizona, California, Connecticut, Delaware, Florida, Georgia, Kentucky, Idaho, Illinois, Indiana, Kansas, Maine, Maryland, Massachusetts, Michigan, Minnesota, Missouri, Nevada, New Hampshire, New York, North Carolina, North Dakota, Ohio, Oklahoma, Pennsylvania, Tennessee, Utah, Vermont, Virginia, Washington, Wisconsin, and West Virginia. Ohio has the most of any state, with eight active routes total.

Route number	States with approved routes	States within corridor	Official length		Formed	Notes
Route number	States with approved routes	States within corridor	(mi)	(km)	Formed	Notes
USBR 1	Maine, New Hampshire, Massachusetts, Maryland, District of Columbia, Virginia, North Carolina, Georgia, Florida	Maine, New Hampshire, Massachusetts, Rhode Island, Connecticut, New York, New Jersey, Pennsylvania, Delaware, Maryland, Washington, D.C., Virginia, North Carolina, South Carolina, Florida	1,820.401	2,930	1982	One of the original routes.
USBR 1A	Maine	Maine	135	217	2011	Seaside alternative to USBR 1 in Maine.
USBR 201	Delaware, Maryland	Delaware, Maryland	105.1	169	2020	
USBR 501	Maine	Maine	327	526	2019	
USBR 7	Vermont, Massachusetts, Connecticut	Vermont, Massachusetts, Connecticut	380.6	613	2015	
USBR 8	Alaska	Alaska, Minnesota, Wisconsin, Michigan	290.94	468	2011	The northernmost route in the system, USBR 8 was approved from Fairbanks to the Canadian border, following Alaska Route 2 along the Richardson and Alaska highways. A second section will run from USBR 10 in Minnesota to USBR 10 in Michigan.
USBR 108	Alaska	Alaska	302	486	2011	A spur of USBR 8 that follows Alaska Route 1 from Tok to Anchorage, at a junction with USBR 97.
USBR 208	Alaska	Alaska	39	63	2011	A spur of Route 8 that follows the Haines Highway.
USBR 10	Washington, Idaho, Michigan	Michigan, Wisconsin, Minnesota, North Dakota, Montana, Idaho, Washington	663.6	1,068	2014	Northernmost planned route in the contiguous United States, roughly following the U.S. Route 2 highway.
USBR 110	Idaho	Idaho	29.8	48	2017	
USBR 210	Idaho	Idaho	33.6	54	2017	
USBR 310	Washington	Washington	1.2	2	2018	
USBR 410	Idaho	Idaho	50	80	2017	
USBR 610	Washington, Idaho	Washington	2.1	3	2018	Extended into Idaho in 2023.
USBR 11	Maryland, West Virginia, Pennsylvania, New York	North Carolina, Virginia, Maryland, Pennsylvania, New York	170.3	274	2014	This route generally parallels U.S. Route 11. The first section was established in Maryland on November 24, 2014.
USBR 15	Georgia, Florida	New York, Pennsylvania, Maryland, West Virginia, Virginia, North Carolina, Georgia, Florida	106.2	171	2018	First segment from Fitzgerald, Georgia, to Florida state line approved in 2018. The second segment from the Georgia state line to USBR 90 in Madison, Florida was approved in 2018.
USBR 20	Michigan, Minnesota, Washington,	Michigan, Wisconsin, Minnesota, North Dakota, Montana, Idaho, Washington, Oregon	575.7	926	2011	Routing in Washington has been approved from Lewis and Clark Trail State Park to Idaho state line at Clarkston, Washington; Michigan section approved from the international Bluewater Ferry to Canada in Marine City, Michigan, and is planned to incorporate the Lake Michigan Carferry crossing between Ludington, Michigan and Manitowoc, Wisconsin.
USBR 21	Kentucky, Georgia, Ohio, Tennessee	Ohio, Kentucky, Tennessee, Georgia	1,043.4	1,679	2015	
USBR 121	Tennessee				2023	Chattanooga to Nashville.
USBR 221	Georgia	Georgia	12.6	20	2018	Originally established in 2015 as USBR 321; renumbered in 2018.
USBR 421	Georgia	Georgia	38.8	62	2018	Originally established in 2015 as USBR 521; renumbered in 2018.
USBR 621	Georgia	Georgia			2016	
USBR 23	Kentucky, Tennessee	Kentucky, Tennessee, Alabama	262.5	422	2013	The planned route takes it through northern Alabama. Route in Tennessee was approved in 2013. Kentucky route was approved in 2018.
USBR 25	Ohio	Michigan, Ohio, Kentucky, Tennessee, Mississippi, Alabama	308.2	496	2021	Planned to run from north of Detroit, Michigan south to Mobile, Alabama.
USBR 225	Ohio	Ohio	2.3	4	2021	
USBR 30	Pennsylvania, Wisconsin, North Dakota, Ohio	New Hampshire, Vermont, New York, Pennsylvania, Ohio, Michigan, Wisconsin, Minnesota, South Dakota, North Dakota, Montana	628.6	1,012	2018	First segment established in 2018. Planned to incorporate the Lake Express ferry crossing on Lake Michigan between Muskegon, Michigan and Milwaukee, Wisconsin. Follows the North Coast Inland Trail in Ohio.
USBR 230	Ohio	Ohio	78.1	126	2021	Coastal alternative to USBR 30 following the coast of Lake Erie. First auxiliary route in the system to share its number with another route in another state.
USBR 230	Wisconsin	Wisconsin	40.02	64	2020	Provides a non ferry alternative to USBR 30 in a part of Wisconsin when the Merrimac Ferry is not in service.
USBR 35	Michigan, Indiana	Michigan, Indiana, Kentucky, Tennessee, Mississippi	856.95	1,379	2012	Planned to run from Sault Ste. Marie, Michigan to USBR 45 on the Mississippi River in Mississippi or Louisiana. Michigan portion dedicated on May 19, 2012. Indiana portion approved in September 2015. Northbound route through downtown Charlevoix, Michigan, added in 2018.
USBR 35A	Indiana	Indiana	30.4	49	2015	
USBR 235	Indiana	Indiana	122.1	197	2021	
USBR 36	Indiana, Illinois, Pennsylvania	Oregon, Idaho, Wyoming, South Dakota, Iowa, Wisconsin, Illinois, Indiana, Michigan, Ohio, Pennsylvania, New Jersey, New York	471.60	759	2014	Segment from Chicago to the Michigan state line established in 2014. Segment through Pennsylvania added in 2018. Planned to stretch from eastern Oregon to New York City.
USBR 37	Illinois	Michigan, Wisconsin, Illinois	57.4	92	2014	Currently runs from the Wisconsin–Illinois state line south to Chicago. Planned to begin at USBR 10 near the border with Michigan's Upper Peninsula. Originally planned as part of USBR 66.
USBR 40	Washington	Washington, Idaho, Montana, Wyoming, Nebraska, Iowa, Illinois, Indiana, Ohio, West Virginia, Pennsylvania, Maryland, Washington, D.C.	1.9	3.1	2021	Established in Washington in 2021, comprising a short section from Tekoa, Washington, to the Idaho state border along Washington State Route 274. Planned to follow the Great American Rail-Trail from La Push, Washington, to Washington, D.C.
USBR 41	Minnesota	Minnesota	315	507	2016	Established in Minnesota in 2016. Runs from the Canada–US border in Minnesota south to the Mississippi River and USBR 45.
USBR 44	Ohio	Ohio, Indiana, Illinois, Iowa	196.1	316	2021	Planned to run from USBR 36 south of Toledo, Ohio to Davenport, Iowa.
USBR 45	Minnesota Wisconsin	Minnesota, Wisconsin, Iowa, Illinois, Kentucky, Tennessee, Missouri, Arkansas, Mississippi, Louisiana	726	1,168	2012	Planned to incorporate the Mississippi River Trail and run from northern Minnesota south to New Orleans, Louisiana, it is unclear whether this route will primarily run along either the west bank or east bank of the Mississippi River. Route was approved May 21, 2012.
USBR 50	District of Columbia, Maryland, Pennsylvania, West Virginia, Ohio, Indiana, Nevada, California	Washington, D.C., Maryland, Pennsylvania, West Virginia, Ohio, Indiana, Illinois, Missouri, Kansas, Nebraska, Colorado, Utah, Nevada, California	1,500.65	2,415	2013	Planned to be one of the longest routes, stretching from Cape Henlopen State Park in Delaware through Washington, D.C. in the east to near San Francisco, California.
USBR 50A	Ohio	Ohio	32.3	52	2015	
USBR 51	Arkansas	Minnesota, Iowa, Missouri, Arkansas, Louisiana	88.5	142	2024	Planned to run from USBR 10 in Minnesota to USBR 45 west of New Orleans.
USBR 55	Kansas	North Dakota, South Dakota, Iowa, Nebraska, Kansas, Oklahoma Texas	288	463	2024	Planned to run from USBR 10 in North Dakota south to USBR 84 near Lubbock, Texas.
USBR 66	Missouri, Kansas, Oklahoma, California	Illinois, Missouri, Kansas, Oklahoma, Texas, New Mexico, Arizona, California	1,117.2	1,798	2018	Planned to roughly follow the decommissioned U.S. Route 66 highway from Chicago, Illinois to Los Angeles, California. Originally planned to continue north to Wisconsin on what is now planned as USBR 37.
USBR 70	Utah	Colorado, Utah, Arizona, Nevada, California	450	724	2015	Planned to run from USBR 76 in Colorado to USBR 66 in California.
USBR 76	Virginia, Kentucky, Illinois, Missouri, Kansas	Virginia, Kentucky, Illinois, Missouri, Kansas, Colorado, Wyoming, Montana, Idaho, Oregon	2,358.7	3,796	1982	One of the two original routes, this is planned to be expanded to the longest route, running from the existing eastern terminus near the Atlantic Ocean in Virginia west to the Pacific Ocean west of Eugene, Oregon. The number refers to 1776 and the U.S. bicentennial year 1976 when this was the "Bikecentennial" route. Like USBR 1, unofficial signs exist in places along the route, which is officially only from Virginia to Missouri. Route approved and signed in Missouri in October 2013. The Kansas segment was realigned in 2018, shortening the route by 7 miles (11 km).
USBR 176	Virginia	Virginia	17	27	2016	
USBR 77	Utah	Montana, Idaho, Utah	349.8	563	2021	Planned to run from USBR 76 and USBR 30 in Montana to USBR 70 in Utah.
USBR 677	Utah	Utah	40.6	65	2021	
USBR 877	Utah	Utah	88.8	143	2021	
USBR 79	Utah	Idaho, Nevada, Utah, Arizona	269.3	433	2015	Planned to run from USBR 36 in Idaho to USBR 90 near Phoenix, Arizona.
USBR 679	Utah	Utah	9.4	15	2021	
USBR 80	Arkansas Tennessee	North Carolina, Tennessee, Arkansas, Oklahoma	725.5	1,168	2022	Planned to run from North Carolina coast to Oklahoma City.
USBR 81	Washington	Washington	103.4	166.4	2021	Planned to run from the Canada border to USBR 20 in Washington. Washington section approved from Asotin to the Spokane–Whitman county line near Latah.
USBR 281	Washington	Washington, Idaho	23.1	37	2021	Washington section approved from Idaho state line near Uniontown to Pullman, with short section in Clarkston.
USBR 85	California	California, Oregon, Washington	788.5	1,269	2024	
USBR 87	Alaska, Washington	Alaska, Washington, Oregon, California	14	23	2011	The middle route of three serving the three West Coast states and Alaska. It is planned to use the Alaska Marine Highway to connect USBR 95 north of Los Angeles, California to Skagway, Alaska. Currently, the only approved route follows the Klondike Highway.
USBR 90	Florida, Arizona	Florida, Alabama, Mississippi, Louisiana, Texas, New Mexico, Arizona, California	997.04	1,605	2014	The southernmost route, running from near Jacksonville, Florida west to San Diego, California. The first section was established in Florida on November 24, 2014. The section through Arizona was approved on September 24, 2015.
USBR 90A	Florida	Florida	23.6	38	2014	
USBR 95	Alaska, Washington, California	Alaska, Washington, Oregon, California	792.1	1,275	2011	USBR 95 currently runs from Delta Junction, Alaska to Valdez, via the Richardson Highway. It is planned to follow the Alaska Marine Highway from Valdez to Bellingham, Washington, and then it will go south to San Diego, California. It is expected to incorporate the Pacific Coast Bicycle Route.
USBR 97	Alaska, Washington	Alaska, Washington	566.7	912	2011	The westernmost route in the system, USBR 97 lies in Alaska and Washington. It connects Fairbanks, Anchorage and Seward via the Seward and Parks highways to Discovery Bay, Washington. It is planned to extend south along the US 101 corridor to USBR 95 near the Oregon border.

== List of prioritized corridors ==
Below is an incomplete list of prioritized corridors, "50-mile-wide areas where a route may be developed":

Route number	Locale	Notes
USBR 5	Virginia, North Carolina, South Carolina, Georgia	Planned to run from USBR 76 in Virginia south to USBR 1 Savannah, Georgia. It will run east of USBR 1.
USBR 9	New York	Planned to run from the Canada–US border in New York to New York City. Initially planned to be designated USBR 3.
USBR 14	Montana, Idaho, Washington	Missoula, Montana to Seattle, Washington vicinity.
USBR 48	Utah, Nevada	Planned to run from Salt Lake City, Utah to USBR 50 near Reno, Nevada.
USBR 65	North Dakota, South Dakota, Nebraska, Kansas, Oklahoma, Texas	Planned to run from USBR 10 in North Dakota south to USBR 84 near Lubbock, Texas.
USBR 75	Colorado, New Mexico, Texas	Planned to run from USBR 76 in Colorado to USBR 90 in El Paso, Texas.
USBR 84	South Carolina, Georgia, Alabama, Mississippi, Arkansas, Texas, New Mexico	Planned to run from the South Carolina coast to near El Paso, Texas.

== See also ==
- TransAmerica Bicycle Trail
- TransCanada Trail
- Adventure Cycling Route Network
- EuroVelo
- Numbered-node cycle network, a contrasting international system that encourages users to take arbitrary routes

U.S. state bicycle route systems:

- List of BicyclePA bicycle routes
- Delaware Bicycle Route 1
- List of bicycle routes in North Carolina
- List of Georgia State Bicycle Routes
- List of New York State Bicycle Routes
