= U.S. Bicycle Route 80 =

Cycle route in the United States

U.S. Bicycle Route 80

Route information
- Length: 177.5 mi (285.7 km)
- Existed: 2022–present

Major junctions
- East end: USBR 45/MRT at the Tennessee state line (Big River Crossing)
- West end: Big Dam Bridge in North Little Rock (Part of the Arkansas River Trail)

Location
- Country: United States
- States: North Carolina, Tennessee, Arkansas, Oklahoma

Highway system
- United States Bicycle Route System; List
← USBR 79	USBR 81 →

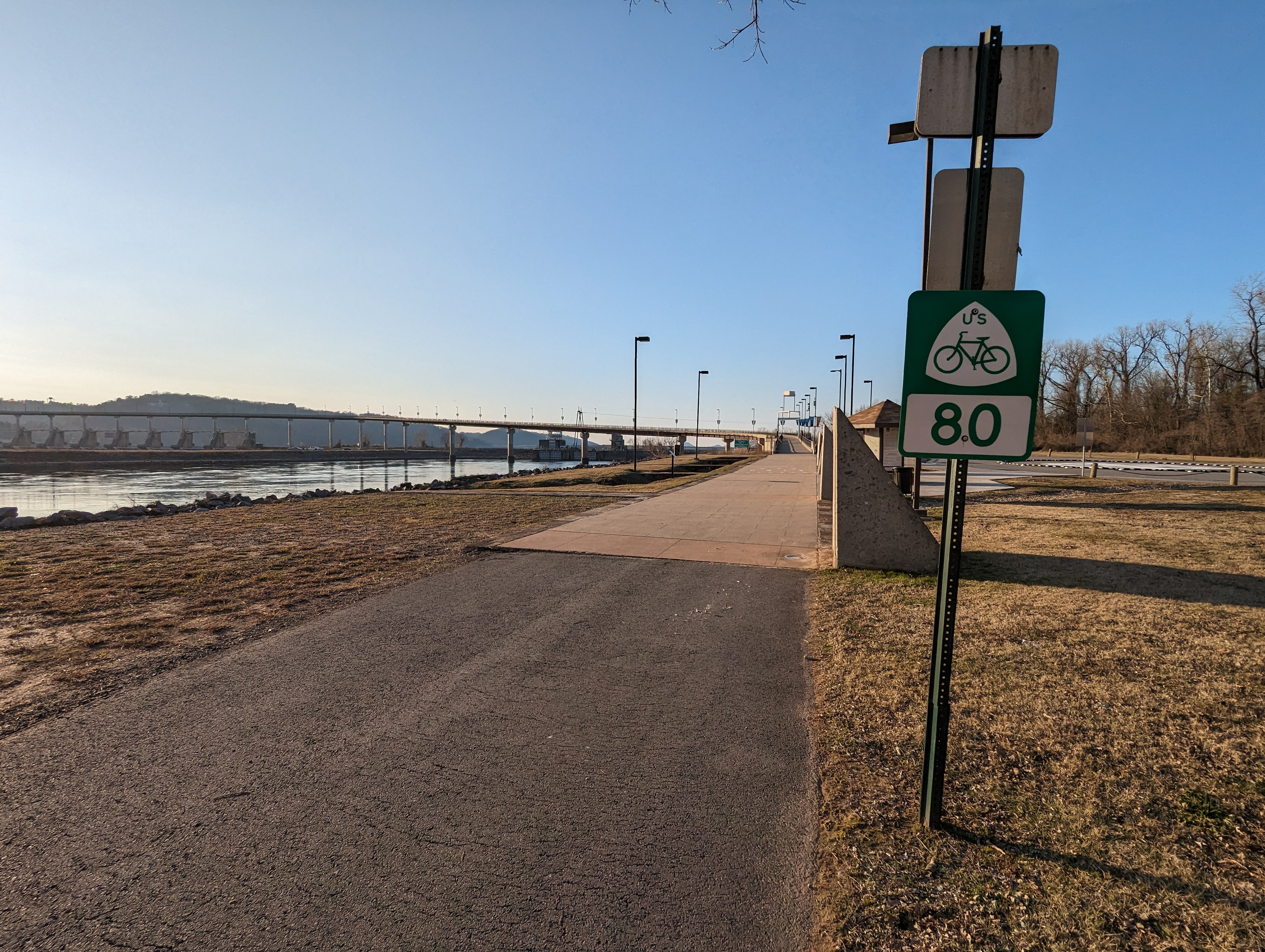
Western terminus of US Bike Route 80 at the Big Dam Bridge in North Little Rock, Arkansas.

U.S. Bicycle Route 80 (USBR 80) is an east–west United States Bicycle Route that travels through North Carolina, Tennessee, Arkansas, and Oklahoma in the United States.

== Route description ==
Lengths
	mi	km
NC	0	0
TN	548	882
AR	177.5	286
OK	0	0
Total	725.5	1,168

Currently, the route is only signed in Arkansas, with approximately 177 miles signed between Little Rock and West Memphis

=== Arkansas ===
USBR 80 begins in Crittenden County at the Tennessee state line over the Mississippi River on the Harahan Bridge, also known as the Big River Crossing. It follows this along with the Mississippi River Trail (USBR 45) west towards West Memphis, closely paralleling US 70/79 on a grade-separated trail. It turns onto South Loop Road and follows this roadway until turning north onto Port Road/Dabbs Avenue/Avalon Street. The route turns west onto Rainer Road and leaves West Memphis proper by turning south onto Waverly Road.

USBR 80 continues along this road through southern Crittenden County, turning onto Lake Rest Road and joining Arkansas Highway 147. South of Anthonyville, the route turns onto Arkansas Highway 50 and then turns southbound onto US Route 79.

The vast majority of USBR 80 follows US Route 79 (westwardly) through St. Francis, Lee, Monroe, Prairie, and Arkansas Counties, including the cities of Hughes, Marianna, Clarendon, and Stuttgart.

In Stuttgart, USBR 80 briefly turns south onto Leslie Street then turns west onto Washington Street, then north onto Burkle Street. Burkle Street very quickly becomes US Route 165, which turns west. It briefly re-enters Prairie County and then into Lonoke County. In England, Arkansas, USBR 80 continues to follow US 165 to the north for a few blocks and then turns west along Arkansas Highway 161. Both AR 161 and USBR 80 turn north near the Arkansas River around the same time they enter Pulaski County.

Near Scott, Arkansas, AR 161 ends at US 165, but the roadway locally continues as Walkers Corner Road. USBR 80 follows this road northward and then turns west onto Faulkner Lake Road. Once entering the city limits of North Little Rock, this road changes names to Lynch Drive. USBR briefly joins US 70 (Broadway Street) and then continues straight on Washington Avenue (US 70 turns to the right away from Washington Avenue). Turning onto Riverfront Drive, USBR 80 follows this road for about a block and then joins the Arkansas River Trail on a dedicated pathway, paralleling the Arkansas River across from Little Rock.

USBR 80 as well as the Arkansas River Trail briefly join River Road until it ends and once again becomes a paved trail. The route continues westward along the Arkansas River towards Burns Park and eventually ends at the Big Dam Bridge.

== History ==
The Arkansas Department of Transportation announced in 2022 that USBR 80 had been designated throughout the aforementioned route. ARDOT has signed the route since that point and finished doing so around 2024.
