= U.S. Bicycle Route 23 =

Long-distance bicycle route in the United States

U.S. Bicycle Route 23

Route information
- Length: 262.5 mi (422.5 km)
- Existed: 2013–present

Major junctions
- North end: USBR 76 at Tanner, Kentucky
- South end: Alabama State Line at Ardmore, Tennessee

Location
- Country: United States
- States: Kentucky, Tennessee

Highway system
- United States Bicycle Route System; List
← USBR 21	USBR 30 →

U.S. Bicycle Route 23 (USBR 23) is a north-south United States Bicycle Route that travels through Middle Tennessee and the Pennyroyal Plateau region of Kentucky in the United States.

The Tennessee segment was designated on October 17, 2013 as the first national bicycle route in the state. The Kentucky segment was designated May 2019.

== Kentucky ==
The route in Kentucky covers 108.7 miles (174.9 km). Within Kentucky the route is named the Cave Country Bike Tour. The northernmost portion of the route runs along the eastern portion of the TransAmerica Trail's Mammoth Cave Loop route.

== Tennessee ==
In Tennessee the route covers 153.8 miles (247.5 km).

=== Spurs ===
- Spur to Natchez Trace is a 3.43-mile (5.52 km) connector to the Natchez Trace Parkway.
- Spur to Henry Horton State Park is 15.44-mile (24.85 km) alternative route to Henry Horton State Park.
