= U.S. Bicycle Route 21 =

Long-distance bicycle route in the United States

U.S. Bicycle Route 21

Route information
- Length: 1,043.4 mi (1,679.2 km)
- Existed: 2015–present

Major junctions
- North end: USBR 30 in Cleveland
- USBR 44 from Massillon to near Wooster, OH; USBR 50 from Columbus to Xenia, OH; USBR 25 from Cincinnati to Aberdeen, OH; USBR 76 in Berea, KY; SBR 90 in LaFayette, GA; SBR 5 near Rockmart, GA; SBR 35 in Atlanta, GA
- South end: Atlanta, GA near the North Avenue station (MARTA)

Location
- Country: United States
- States: Ohio, Kentucky, Tennessee, Georgia

Highway system
- United States Bicycle Route System; List
← USBR 20	USBR 23 →

U.S. Bicycle Route 21 (USBR 21) is a north–south United States Bicycle Route that travels through Ohio, Kentucky, Tennessee, and Georgia in the United States.

== Route description ==
Lengths
	mi	km
OH	366.9	590
KY	265.3	427
TN	250.4	403
GA	160.8	259
Total	1,043.4	1,679

=== Ohio ===
USBR 21 begins at a junction with USBR 30 at Edgewater Park in Cleveland. From Cleveland to Cincinnati, it runs along the Ohio to Erie Trail, concurrent with State Bicycle Route 1, which mostly consists of off-road multi-purpose trails such as the Ohio and Erie Canal Towpath Trail and Little Miami Scenic Trail. There are additional overlaps with USBR 44 Massillon to near Wooster and with USBR 50 from Columbus to Xenia. Past Cincinnati, the route resumes along the Ohio River Trail, concurrent with USBR 25, to the Kentucky state line at Aberdeen.

=== Kentucky ===
Across the Ohio River from Aberdeen in Maysville, USBR 21 continues along the Bluegrass Tour route to the Tennessee state line near Middlesboro. It intersects with USBR 76, one of the first U.S. Bicycle Routes, at Berea.

=== Tennessee ===
USBR 21 runs from Cumberland Gap National Historical Park to Chattanooga.

=== Georgia ===
USBR 21 follows the Silver Comet Trail for 52 miles (84 km) from Cedartown to Smyrna.

== History ==
The American Association of State Highway and Transportation Officials (AASHTO) approved the southern segment of USBR 21 in Georgia in 2015 as the first U.S. Bicycle Route in the state. In May 2019, AASHTO approved the northern segment through Kentucky, which was extended in May 2021 through Ohio to its northern terminus in Cleveland. In 2022, the route was extended through Tennessee, connecting the two segments.

== Auxiliary routes ==
=== U.S. Bicycle Route 221 ===
U.S. Bicycle Route 221
- Location: Chickamauga and Chattanooga National Military Park
- Length: 12.3 mi (19.8 km)
- Existed: 2015–present

U.S. Bicycle Route 221 (USBR 221) was originally established in 2015 as USBR 321, but was renumbered to USBR 221 in 2018. It connects to Chickamauga and Chattanooga National Military Park.

=== U.S. Bicycle Route 421 ===
U.S. Bicycle Route 421
- Location: Mountain Cove Farms
- Length: 38.7 mi (62.3 km)
- Existed: 2015–present

U.S. Bicycle Route 421 (USBR 421) was originally established in 2015 as USBR 521, but was renumbered to USBR 421 in 2018. It connects to Mountain Cove Farms.

=== U.S. Bicycle Route 621 ===
U.S. Bicycle Route 621
- Location: Rome, Georgia
- Length: 25.5 mi (41.0 km)
- Existed: 2016–present

U.S. Bicycle Route 621 (USBR 621) connects to Rome, Georgia.
