= U.S. Bicycle Route 20 =

Long-distance bicycle route in Michigan

U.S. Bicycle Route 20

Route information
- Length: 579.8 mi (933.1 km)
- Existed: 2011–present

Washington segment
- Length: 77.9 mi (125.4 km)
- West end: Columbia–Walla Walla county line near Waitsburg, Washington
- Major intersections: USBR 81 in Clarkston, Washington
- East end: Southway Bridge at Idaho state line in Lewiston, Idaho

Minnesota segment
- Length: 314 mi (505 km)
- West end: Red River at I-94 bridge in Moorhead, Minnesota
- East end: Hester Park on the Mississippi River north of downtown St. Cloud, Minnesota

Michigan segment
- Length: 314 mi (505 km)
- West end: with US 10 at SS Badger in Ludington, Michigan (currently)
- East end: near M-29 at the Bluewater Ferry in Marine City, Michigan

Location
- Country: United States
- States: Washington, Minnesota, Michigan

Highway system
- United States Bicycle Route System; List
← USBR 11	USBR 21 →

U.S. Bicycle Route 20 (USBR 20) is a U.S. Numbered Bicycle Route that is planned to run from the Oregon Coast to Marine City, Michigan. As of 2021, sections of the route in Washington state and Michigan have been approved by the American Association of State Highway and Transportation Officials (AASHTO), comprising 387 miles (623 km).

== Route description ==
Lengths
	mi	km
WA	77.9	125.4
MN	187.9	302.4
MI	314.0	505.3
Total	579.8	933.1

=== Washington ===
The route runs 77.9 miles (125.4 km) from the Columbia–Walla Walla county line near Lewis and Clark Trail State Park to the Idaho state line at Clarkston, Washington, following U.S. Route 12.

=== Minnesota ===
The section of USBR 20 in Minnesota is 187.9 miles (302.4 km). It starts at the North Dakota border at Moorhead and the Red River. From there it is on roads and trails to Pelican Rapids. It merges with the Heart of the Lakes Trail to Maplewood State Park, and then to Fergus Falls on a section of the North Country Trail. It continues on the Central Lakes Trail to Osakis and then the Lake Wobegon Regional Trail and on to the Mississippi River at St. Cloud.

=== Michigan ===
USBR 20 in Michigan is 314 miles (505 km). The route connects with ferries on both sides of Michigan's Lower Peninsula. In Marine City in the east, it meets the Bluewater Ferry which connects to Sombra, Ontario, Canada. In the west, it connects to the Lake Michigan Carferry from Ludington, Michigan, to Manitowoc, Wisconsin.

== History ==
On May 4, 2011, AASHTO voted to approve the Michigan Department of Transportation's application for designation of the 310-mile-long (500 km) Michigan segment of the route.

The Washington section was approved by AASHTO in August 2021.

The Minnesota section was announced by Adventure Cycling Association on June 28, 2022.

The remaining sections of the route are not yet well-defined, but it is planned to run through Idaho, Montana, North Dakota, and Wisconsin as well as Washington, Minnesota, and Michigan.

== Images ==
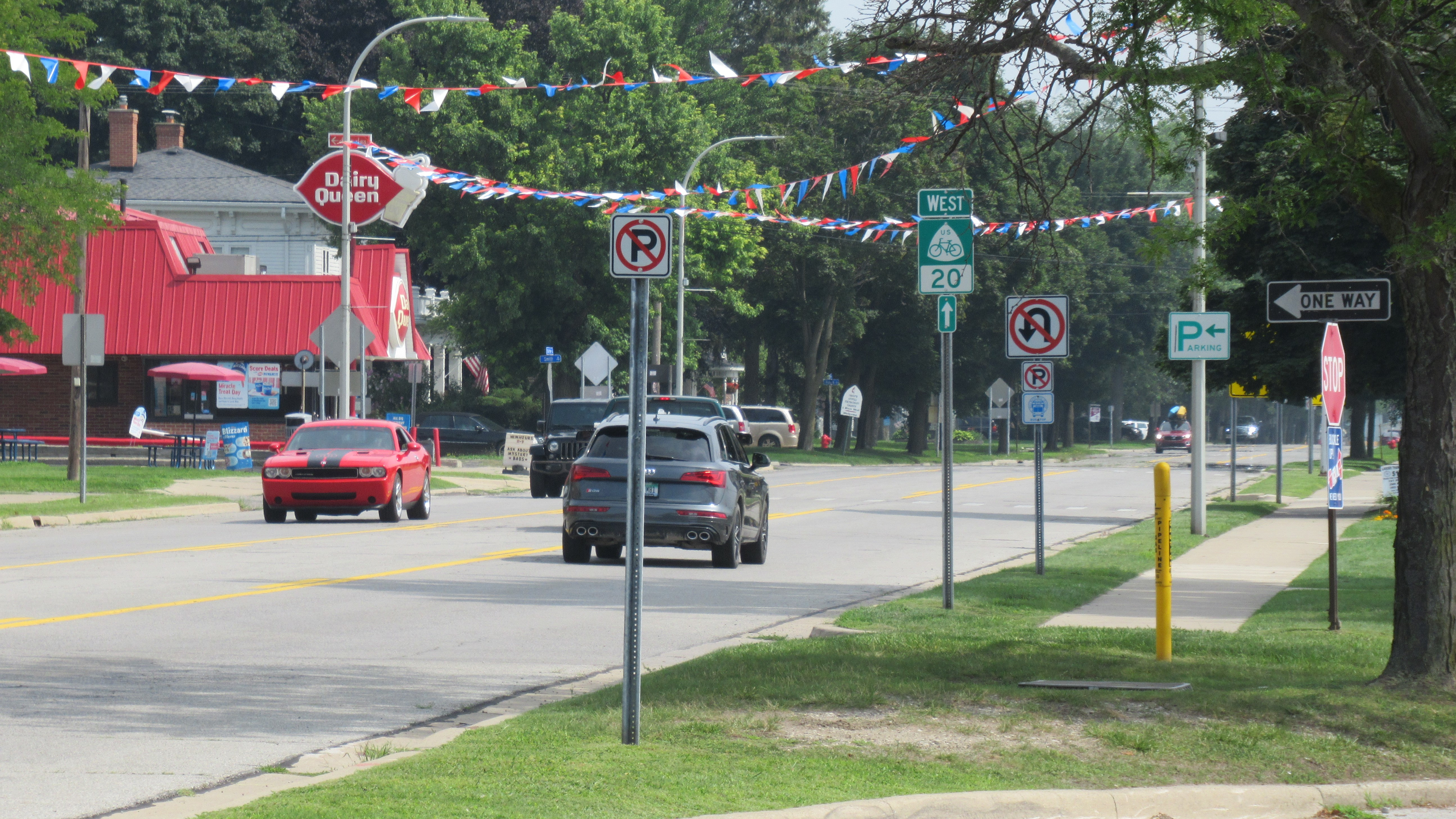
USBR 20 in Algonac along M-29

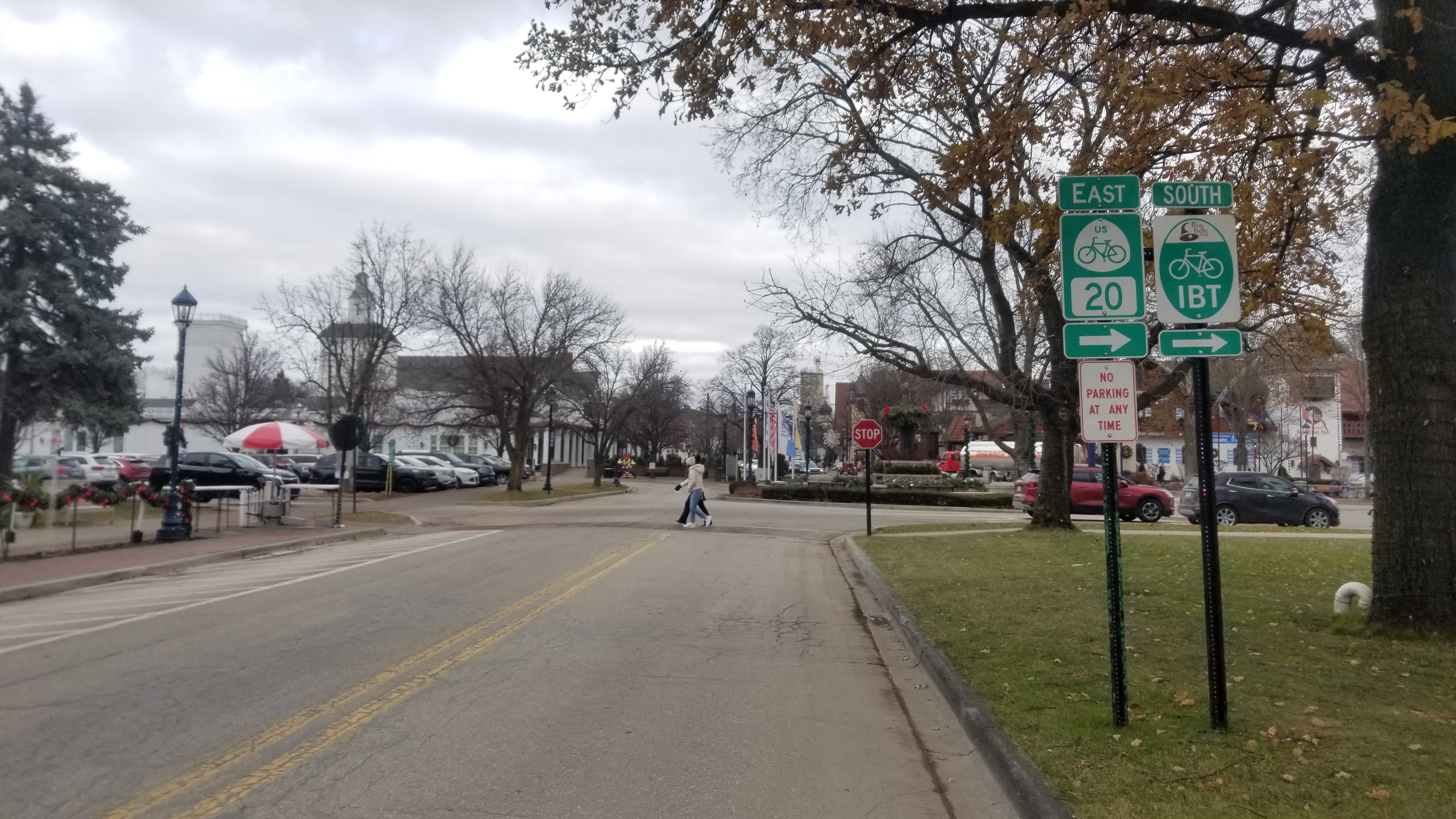
The Iron Belle Trail in Frankenmuth

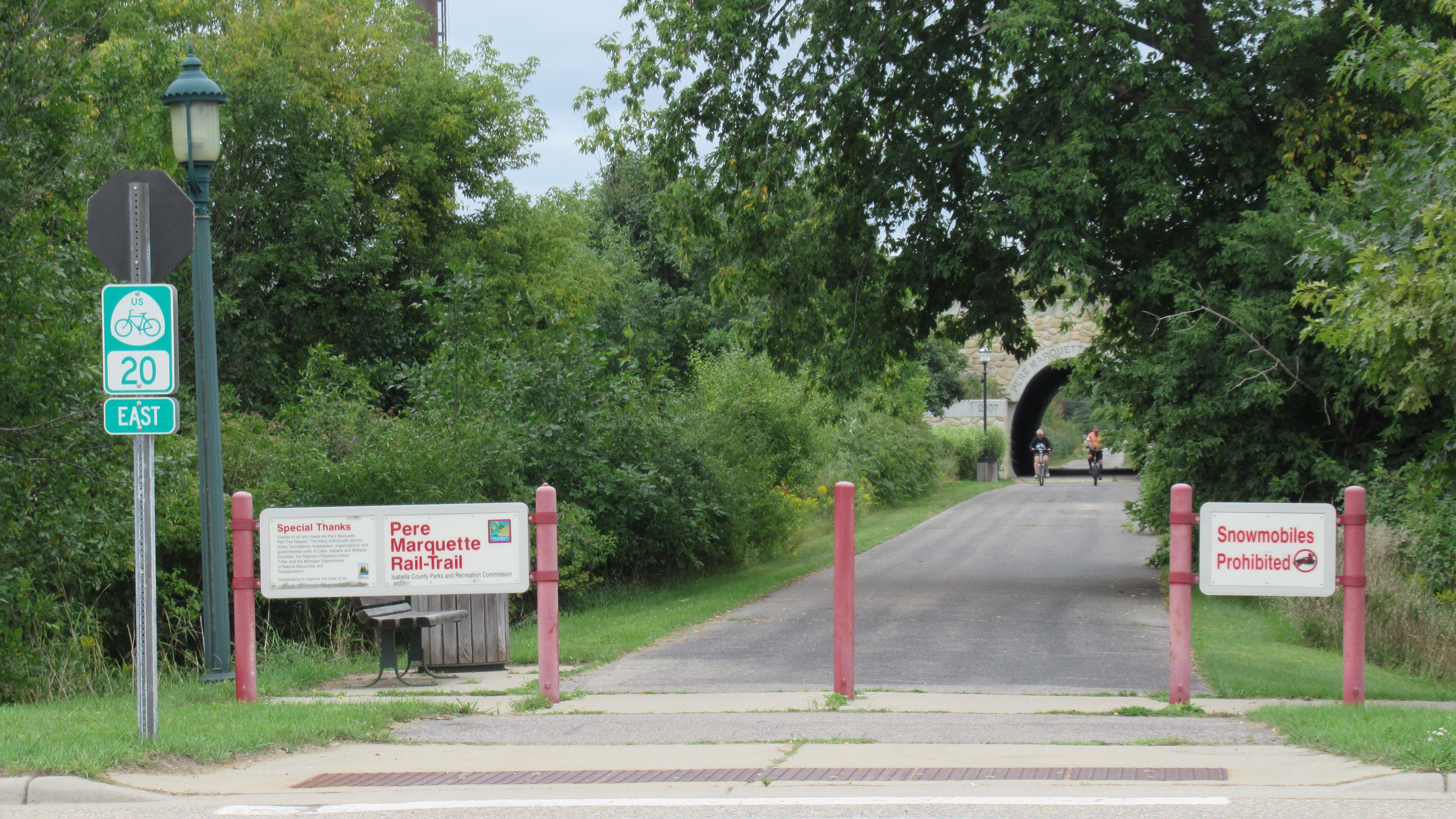
Pere Marquette Rail Trail in Clare

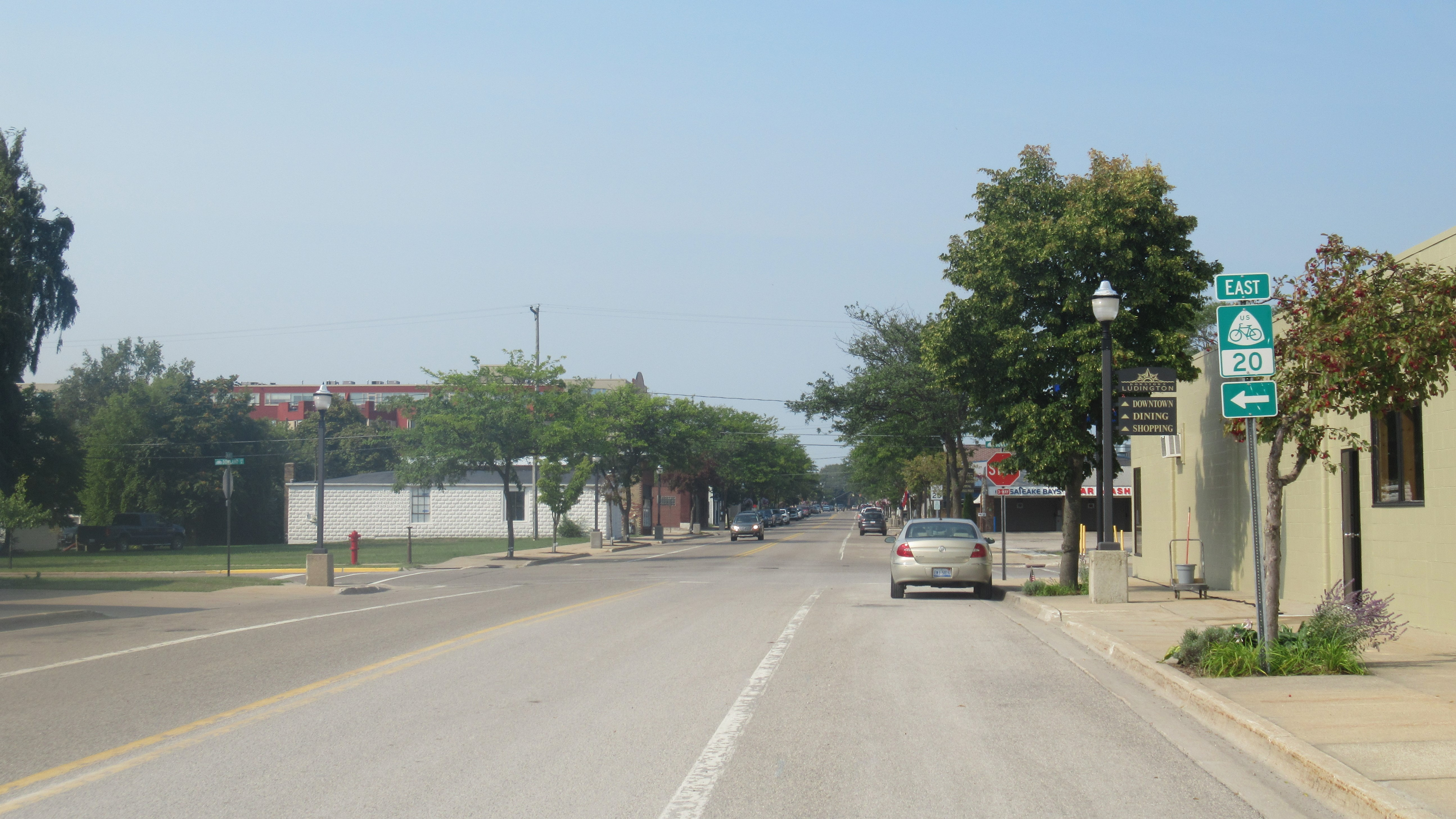
USBR 20 in Ludington
