= U.S. Bicycle Route 1 =

Cross-country bicycle route

U.S. Bicycle Route 1

Route information
- Length: 1,820.401 mi (2,929.651 km)
- Existed: 1982–present

Southern segment
- Length: 783.901 mi (1,261.566 km)
- South end: Key West, FL
- Major intersections: USBR 90 near St. Augustine, FL
- North end: South Carolina border/Savannah River near Clyo, GA

Middle segment
- Length: 575.3 mi (925.9 km)
- South end: South Carolina border near Laurinburg, NC
- Major intersections: USBR 76 near Richmond, VA; USBR 50 in Washington, D.C.
- North end: BicyclePA Route J Pennsylvania border near Freeland, MD

Massachusetts segment
- Length: 38 mi (61 km)
- South end: Boxford, MA
- North end: Salisbury, MA

Northern segment
- Length: 423.2 mi (681.1 km)
- South end: Seabrook, NH
- North end: Canada–US border near Calais, ME

Location
- Country: United States
- States: Florida, Georgia (southern segment); North Carolina, Virginia, District of Columbia, Maryland (middle segment); Massachusetts (small segments inside the state); New Hampshire, Maine (northern segment)

Highway system
- United States Bicycle Route System; List
| ← USBR 97 | USBR 7 → |

U.S. Bicycle Route 1 (often called U.S. Bike Route 1, abbreviated USBR 1) is a cross-country bicycle route that runs the length of the United States eastern seaboard from Florida to Maine. It is one of the two original U.S. Bicycle Routes, the other being U.S. Bicycle Route 76.

AASHTO recognizes the segments in Florida, Georgia, North Carolina, Virginia, Maryland, Massachusetts, New Hampshire, and Maine as being the only "official" segments of USBR 1. The other segments, even if signed or mapped, have not yet been submitted by the states to AASHTO for formal inclusion or recognition in the U.S. Bicycle Route system. The New Hampshire and Maine sections of USBR 1 were approved in May 2011, with the New Hampshire section following the East Coast Greenway. Also approved was an alternate route, U.S. Bicycle Route 1A, that runs closer to the coast through a portion of Maine. Florida and Massachusetts segments were established in November 2014. Georgia's segment was designated in May 2019.

In Georgia, State Bicycle Route 95 is planned to be incorporated into USBR 1.

== Route description ==
Lengths
| | mi | km |
|---|---|---|
| FL | 583.951 | 939.778 |
| GA | 199.95 | 321.79 |
| NC | 200 | 320 |
| VA | 274 | 441 |
| DC | 7 | 11 |
| MD | 94.3 | 151.8 |
| MA | 38 | 61 |
| NH | 26.2 | 42.2 |
| ME | 397 | 639 |
| Total | 1,726.101 | 2,777.890 |

=== Communities ===
The following communities are serviced by the route:

Florida

- Key West
- Jacksonville

Georgia

- Effingham County
- Chatham County
- Liberty County
- McIntosh County
- Glynn County
- Camden County
- Charlton County

North Carolina

- Laurinburg
- Southern Pines
- Sanford
- Apex
- Cary
- Raleigh
- Oxford
- Henderson

Virginia

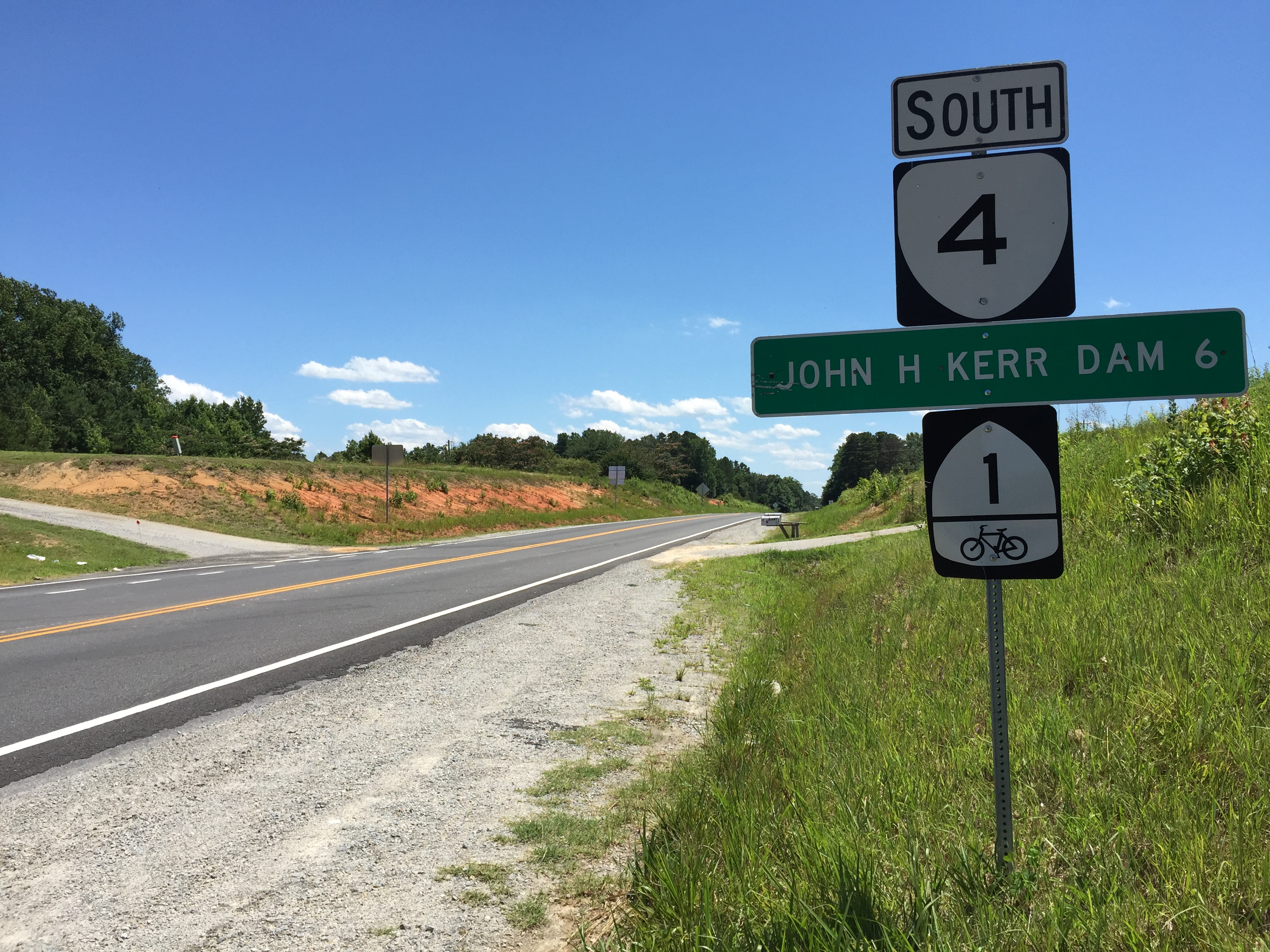
Sign for USBR 1 along Virginia State Route 4 in Virginia, June 2017

- John H. Kerr Dam
- Victoria
- Burkeville
- Richmond
- Ashland
- Fredericksburg
- Chatham Heights
- Leeland
- Tacketts Mill
- Aden
- Springfield
- Occoquan
- Lorton
- Fort Belvoir
- Mount Vernon
- Alexandria
- Arlington

Massachusetts

- Boston
- Malden

New Hampshire

- Portsmouth

Maine

- Portland
- Augusta
- Bangor
- Calais

== U.S. Bicycle Route 1A ==
Coastal Route
- Location: Brunswick – Bucksport, Maine
- Length: 135 mi (217 km)
- Existed: 2011–present

U.S. Bicycle Route 1A is an alternate route to USBR 1 in Maine, following the Atlantic coast between Brunswick and Bucksport.

== See also ==
- East Coast Greenway
