= U.S. Bicycle Route 76 =

Long-distance bicycle route

U.S. Bicycle Route 76
- TransAmerica Bike Route

Route information
- Length: 2,358.7 mi (3,796.0 km)
- Existed: 1982–present

Major junctions
- West end: Near Towner, Colorado; Oregon Coast (proposed)
- USBR 66 in Marshfield, MO; USBR 23 in Tanner, KY; USBR 21 in Berea, KY; USBR 1 in Ashland, VA
- East end: Yorktown, Virginia

Location
- Country: United States
- States: Kansas, Missouri, Illinois, Kentucky, Virginia

Highway system
- United States Bicycle Route System; List
← USBR 70	USBR 79 →

U.S. Bicycle Route 76 (USBR 76) is a cross-country bicycle route east of Colorado in the United States. It is one of the two original U.S. Bicycle Routes, the other being U.S. Bicycle Route 1. USBR 76 runs from the Midwestern state of Kansas to the eastern seaboard state of Virginia. It is also known as the TransAmerica Bike Route and is contained within the TransAmerica Bicycle Trail.

A spur, U.S. Bicycle Route 176, was established in Virginia in 2016.

== History ==
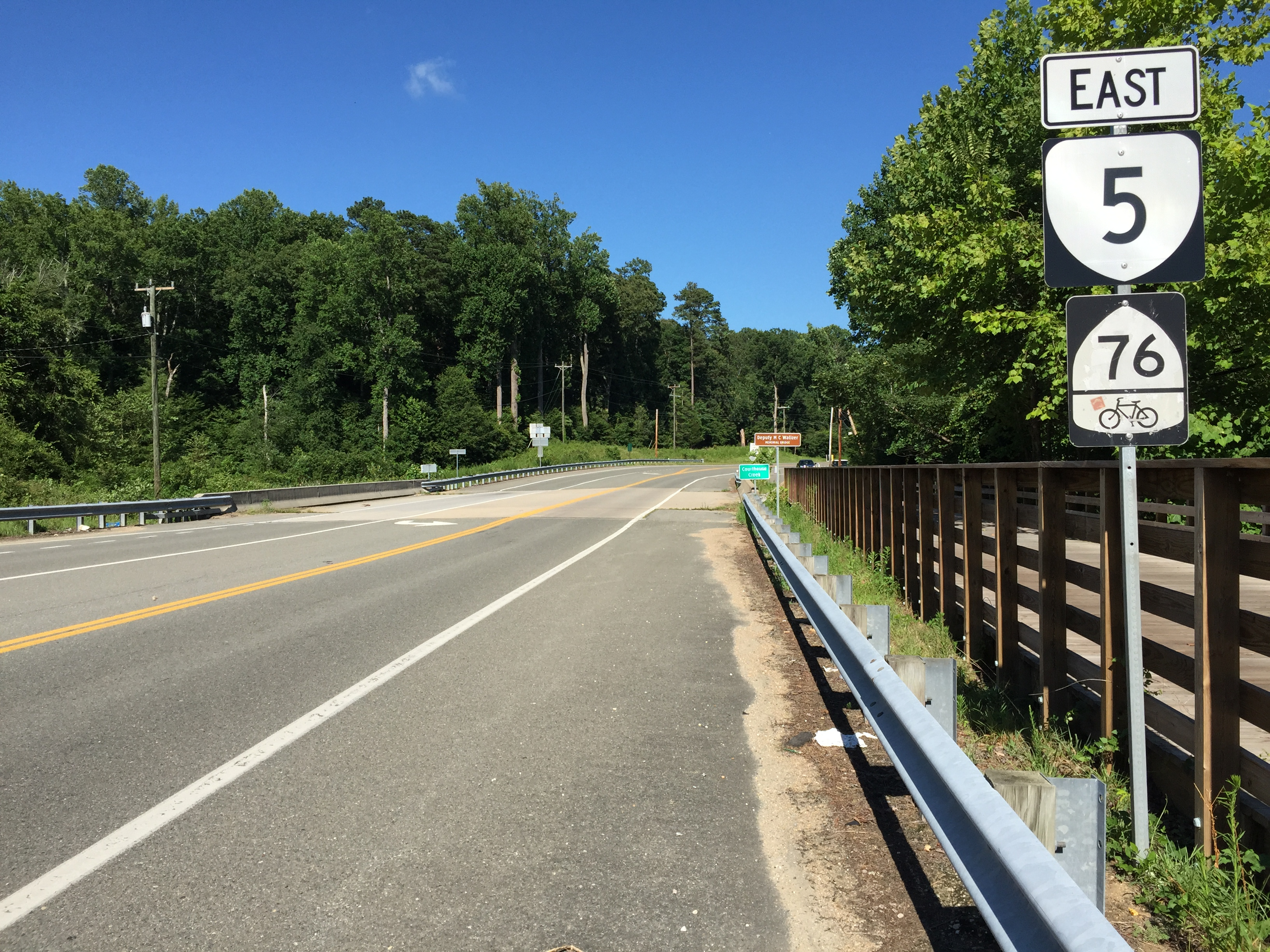
Bicycle Route 76 along SR 5 in Charles City, Virginia

Bicycle Route 76 originated as the Bikecentennial, the route for a large bike tour organized for the 1976 celebration of the United States Bicentennial. The Adventure Cycling Association was at that time also known as the "Bikecentennial."

USBR 76 was established in 1982 as an original U.S. Bicycle Route, along with U.S. Bicycle Route 1 from Florida to Virginia. Bicycle traffic along a good deal of Bicycle Route 76 has been sparse to practically non-existent for several years. However, a 2003 conference encouraged the establishment of new interstate bicycle routes, as well as proposing the extension the two existing ones, 76's western terminus being conjectured on the Oregon coast.

Since 2014, the annual Trans Am Bike Race has used the route.

== Route description ==
Lengths
	mi	km
KS	480	770
MO	348.5	560.9
IL	136.7	220.0
KY	563.7	907.2
VA	558	898
Total	2,358.7	3,796.0

=== Kansas ===
In Kansas, USBR 76 runs from the Colorado state line at K-96 near Towner, Colorado, to the Missouri state line at K-126 near Pittsburg, Kansas.

=== Missouri ===
In the state of Missouri, USBR 76 is signed. The route begins at the Kansas border 28 miles (45 km) west of Golden City, continuing east across 348.5 miles (560.9 km) of the state before reaching the Mississippi River just west of Chester, Illinois. The route passes through the following counties:

- Ste. Genevieve County
- St. Francois County
- Iron County
- Reynolds County
- Shannon County
- Texas County
- Wright County
- Webster County
- Greene County
  - Just east of Walnut Grove, USBR 76 intersects the 35-mile-long (56 km) Frisco Highline Trail, which connects the route to Springfield to the south and Bolivar to the north
- Dade County
- Jasper County
- Barton County

=== Illinois ===
In the state of Illinois, USBR 76 intersects the Tunnel Hill State Trail in southern Illinois and passes through the following counties:

- Randolph County
- Jackson County
- Williamson County
- Johnson County
- Pope County
- Hardin County

=== Kentucky ===
In the state of Kentucky, USBR 76 is signed, and a map is available as part of a state bicycle tours publication.

=== Virginia ===
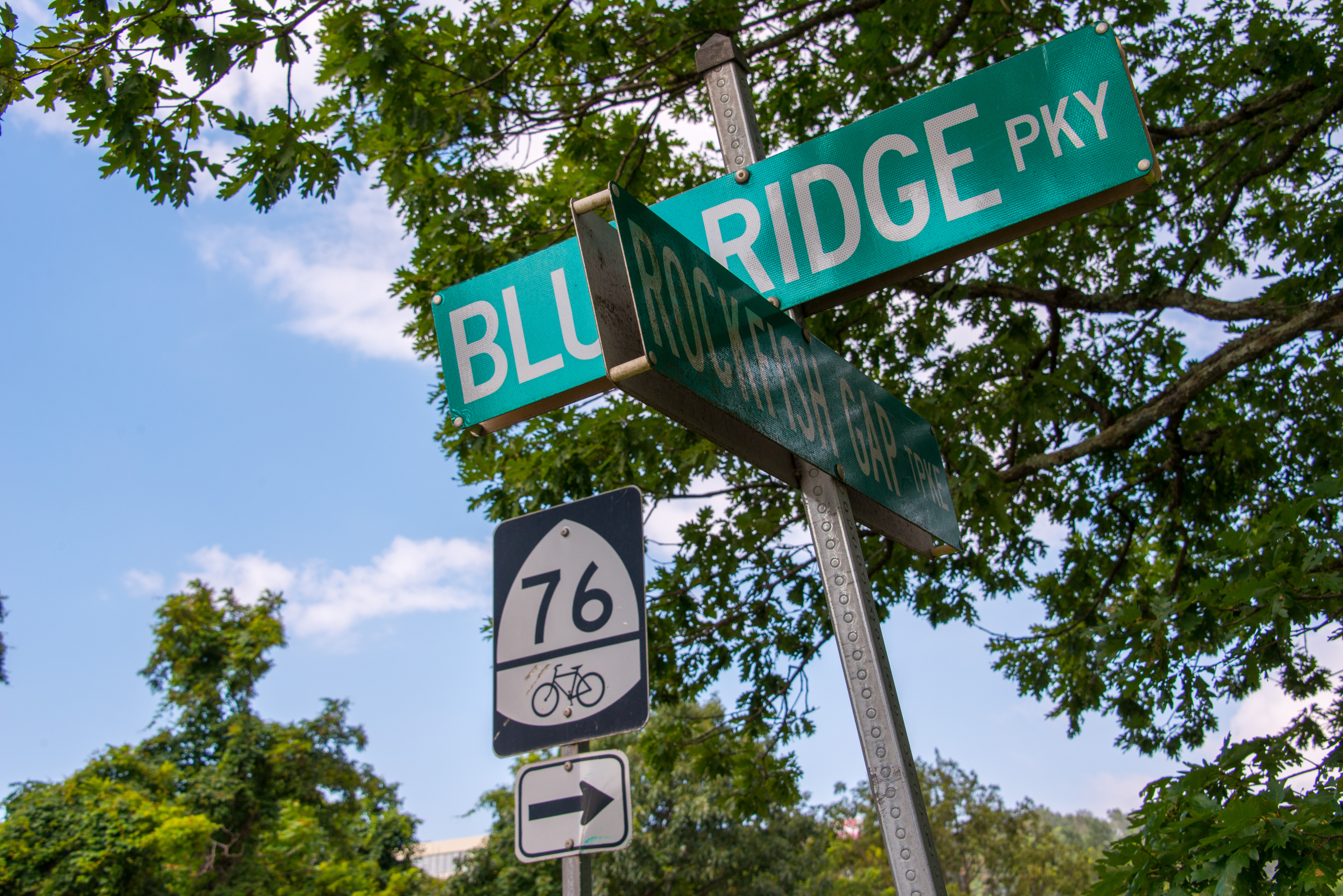
USBR 76 at Rockfish Gap

In the state of Virginia, part of USBR 76 is signed, and a map is available as part of a state bicycling publication. The route passes along the following roads and through the following counties and communities:

- State Route 80 (Virginia) from Elkhorn City, Kentucky to Meadowview, Virginia in Washington County
- Buchanan County (10.9 mi.)
- Dickenson County (20.6 mi.)
- Russell County (20.1 mi.)
- Washington County (38.4 mi.)
  - Meadowview to Damascus
  - U.S. Route 58 from Damascus, where the route crosses the Virginia Creeper Trail and the Appalachian Trail to County Route 603 through Smyth County to Troutdale in Grayson County
- Smyth County (6.4 mi.)
- Grayson County (7.4 mi.)
  - State Route 16 from Troutdale to Sugar Grove in Smyth County
- Smyth County (14.7 mi.)
- Wythe County (34.7 mi.)
- Pulaski County (23 mi.)
- City of Radford (2.6 mi.)
- Montgomery County (27.9 mi.)
  - County Routes 787, 664, 600, and 666 from Radford to Christiansburg
  - Ellett Road (County Route 723) from Cambria in Christiansburg to Ellett crossing the Eastern Continental Divide and passing under the Wilson Creek Bridge, second tallest bridge in Virginia, and part of the Virginia Smart Road, and passing Trinity United Methodist Church, Earhart House, and Blankenship Farm
  - Lusters Gate Road (County Route 723) from Ellett to Lusters Gate passing through the Virginian Railway Underpass and New Ellett and through Ellett Valley with the North Fork of the Roanoke River to the east and the Eastern Continental Divide and Blacksburg a few miles to the west
  - Catawba Road (County Route 785) from Lusters Gate to the Roanoke County line passing through Catawba Valley
- Roanoke County (13.7 mi.)
  - Blacksburg Road (County Route 785) from the Montgomery County line to Catawba passing out of the Roanoke River watershed and into the Chesapeake Bay (James River) watershed
  - County Route 779 from Catawba to the Botetourt County line
- Botetourt County (40.5 mi.)
- Rockbridge County (17 mi.)
- City of Lexington (3 mi.)
- Rockbridge County (27.6 mi.)
- Augusta County and Nelson County (29.8 mi)
- Just south of Waynesboro near Afton Mountain, the route runs along the Blue Ridge Parkway for about 25 miles, overlooking the Shenandoah Valley to the west and Nelson County's Rockfish Valley to the east.
- Albemarle County (38.9 mi.)
- City of Charlottesville (3.7 mi.)
- Fluvanna County (21.7 mi.)
- Goochland County (4.1 mi.)
- Louisa County (31.4 mi.)
- Hanover County (50.7 mi.)
- Henrico County (16 mi.)
- Charles City County (26.8 mi.)
- James City County (13.9 mi.)
  - Along the Colonial Parkway to Yorktown
- City of Williamsburg (3.2 mi.)
- York County (11.4 mi)
  - Yorktown

Total miles: 560.1

== Auxiliary routes ==
=== U.S. Bicycle Route 176 ===
U.S. Bicycle Route 176
- Location: Richmond, Virginia
- Length: 17 mi (27 km)
- Existed: 2016–present

U.S. Bicycle Route 176 is a 17 miles (27 km) connector route that connecting USBR 1 and USBR 76 at a point a little further south than where the routes cross. It travels along the Virginia Capital Trail for 15.7 miles (25.3 km).
