= U.S. Bicycle Route 7 =

Bicycle route in the United States

U.S. Bicycle Route 7

Route information
- Length: 380.6 mi (612.5 km)
- Existed: 2015–present

Major junctions
- South end: Norwalk, Connecticut
- East Coast Greenway in Norwalk, Connecticut; Route Verte 4 at the Canadian border
- North end: Canadian border

Location
- Country: United States
- States: Vermont, Massachusetts, Connecticut

Highway system
- United States Bicycle Route System; List
← USBR 1	USBR 8 →

U.S. Bicycle Route 7 (USBR 7) is a north–south U.S. Bicycle Route that follows the Western New England Greenway in Connecticut, Massachusetts, and Vermont in the United States.

== Route description ==
USBR 7 runs parallel to U.S. Route 7 from a junction with the East Coast Greenway in Norwalk, Connecticut, to Route Verte 4 at the Canadian border. The route is currently only signed in Connecticut.

== History ==
The Vermont segment was established in 2015, and the rest of the route was added the following year. In 2023, the Connecticut section was signed by cyclist Tom O'Brien.

== Future ==
When U.S. Bicycle Route 1 is extended through Connecticut, it is expected to meet USBR 7 near Norwalk.
