= U.S. Bicycle Route 90 =

Long-distance bicycle route in Arizona and Florida

U.S. Bicycle Route 90

Route information
- Length: 997.04 mi (1,604.58 km)
- Existed: 2014–present

Western segment
- Length: 573.24 mi (922.54 km)
- West end: California state line near Blythe, California
- East end: New Mexico state line near Rodeo, New Mexico

Eastern segment
- Length: 423.8 mi (682.0 km)
- West end: Alabama state line near Pensacola, Florida
- Major intersections: USBR 15 in Madison, Florida
- East end: USBR 1 near St. Augustine, Florida

Location
- Country: United States
- States: Arizona, Florida

Highway system
- United States Bicycle Route System; List
← USBR 87	USBR 95 →

U.S. Bicycle Route 90 (USBR 90) is an east–west U.S. Bicycle Route in Arizona and Florida. The American Association of State Highway and Transportation Officials (AASHTO) ultimately plans to extend the route to San Diego, California from its current eastern terminus on the Atlantic Coast south of Jacksonville, Florida.

== History ==
USBR 90 was established in November 2014 with the official designation of the 424-mile (682 km) Florida section. Its 573-mile (922 km) section through Arizona was approved in September 2015.

== Auxiliary routes ==
=== U.S. Bicycle Route 90A ===
U.S. Bicycle Route 90A
- Location: Pensacola, Florida
- Length: 23.6 mi (38.0 km)
- Existed: 2014–present

U.S. Bicycle Route 90A is an 23.6-mile (38.0 km) alternate route following U.S. Route 90 through Pensacola, Florida.
