= U.S. Bicycle Route 97 =

Long-distance bicycle route in Alaska and Washington state

U.S. Bicycle Route 97

Route information
- Length: 566.7 mi (912.0 km)
- Existed: 2011–present

Southern section
- South end: Port Townsend–Coupeville ferry
- North end: Peace Arch Border Crossing

Northern section
- South end: Seward, AK
- Major intersections: USBR 108 in Fairbanks, AK; USBR 8 in Anchorage, AK
- North end: Fairbanks, AK

Location
- Country: United States
- States: Washington, Alaska

Highway system
- United States Bicycle Route System; List
← USBR 95	USBR 1 →

U.S. Bicycle Route 97 (USBR 97) is the westernmost U.S. Numbered Bicycle Route, with sections in Alaska and Washington.

In Alaska, USBR 97 passes through Anchorage. Much of the route follows the Parks Highway, and it passes the entrance of Denali National Park. It has connections to U.S. Bicycle Route 8 in Fairbanks and U.S. Bicycle Route 108 in Anchorage. USBR 97 was approved by AASHTO in early May 2011, making it one of the first expansions of the U.S. Bike Route system since 1982.

The Washington section, connecting the Port Townsend–Coupeville ferry to the Peace Arch Border Crossing, was added in 2017. The segment through Washington was realigned in 2018 to use safer routes on Whidbey Island.
