= U.S. Bicycle Route 10 =

Long-distance bicycle route in the northern United States

U.S. Bicycle Route 10

Route information
- Length: 663.6 mi (1,068.0 km)
- Existed: May 28, 2014–present

Western segment
- West end: Anacortes, Washington ferry terminal
- Major intersections: USBR 95 in Burlington, Washington; USBR 87 in Sedro-Woolley, Washington
- East end: Montana state line near Cabinet, Idaho

Eastern segment
- West end: Wisconsin state line near Iron Mountain, Michigan
- East end: USBR 35 in St. Ignace, Michigan

Location
- Country: United States
- States: Washington, Idaho, Michigan

Highway system
- United States Bicycle Route System; List
← USBR 8	USBR 11 →

U.S. Bicycle Route 10 (USBR 10) is a United States Bicycle Route that is planned to follow U.S. Route 2 across the northern United States, beginning in Anacortes, Washington and ending in St. Ignace, Michigan. As of 2015, only 666 miles (1,072 km) of the planned corridor is designated, within the states of Washington, Idaho, and Michigan.

The Washington segment was designated in May 2014 as the first national bicycle route in the state. The designation of the Michigan segment came shortly thereafter in November 2014, followed by an extension of the western segment into Idaho in May 2015.

== Route description ==
Lengths
	mi	km
WA	404.6	651.1
ID	66	106
MI	193	311
Total	663.6	1,068.0

USBR 10 runs parallel to U.S. Route 2 for most of its route and also incorporates part of the Northern Tier route of the Adventure Cycling Route Network.

=== Western segment ===
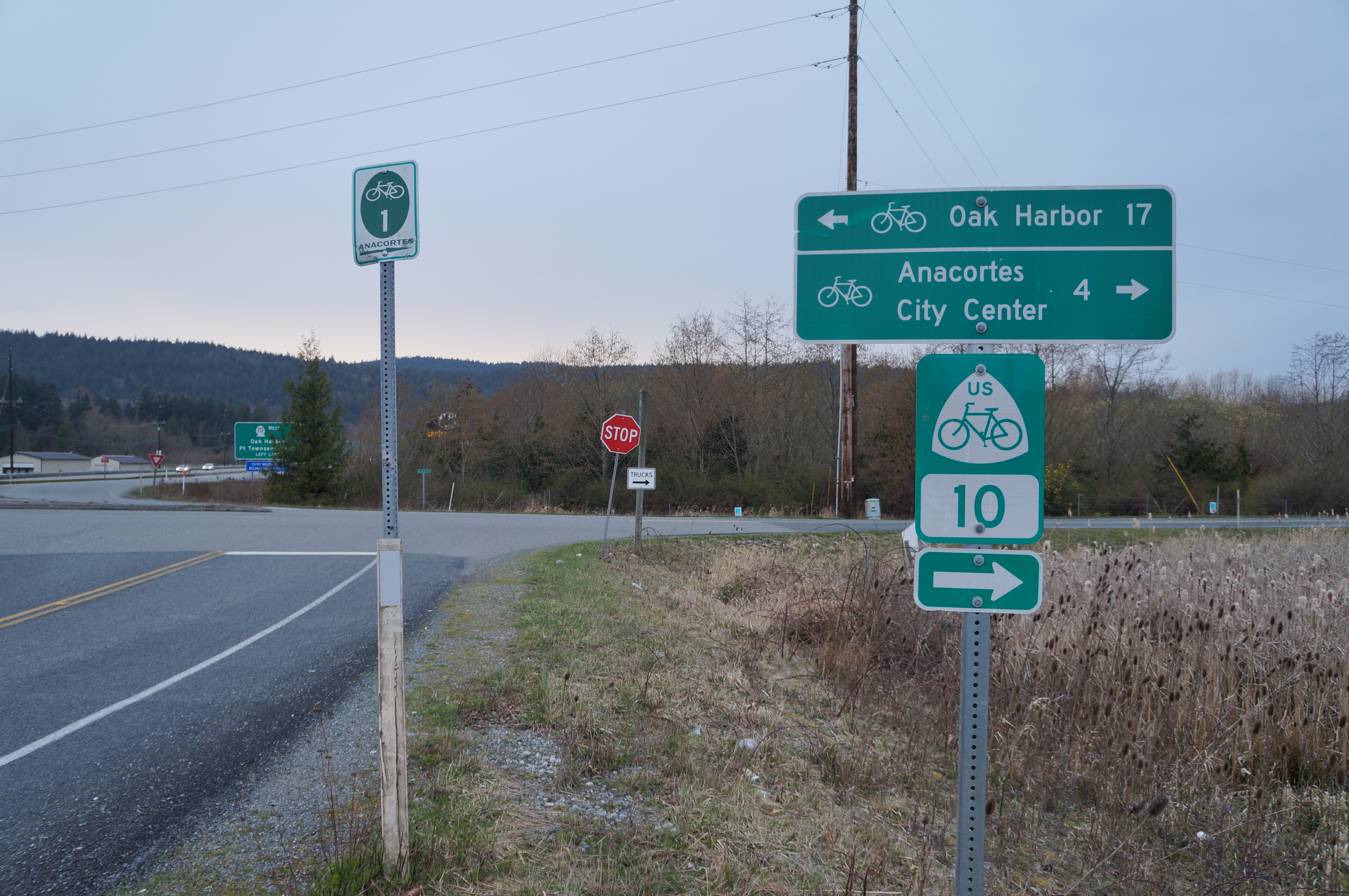
Signed section of USBR 10 near Anacortes, Washington

USBR 10 begins at a Washington State Ferries terminal in Anacortes, Washington, at the terminus of Washington State Route 20 Spur. The route travels east along the Guemes Channel into downtown Anacortes, where it leaves the highway and uses city streets; USBR 10 leaves Anacortes on the Tommy Thompson Trail, crossing over Fidalgo Bay on a former railroad trestle to March Point. The route follows State Route 20 across Washington Pass and northern Washington to Newport, where it crosses into Idaho.

Within Bonner County, Idaho, the route follows U.S. Route 2 to Sandpoint and State Highway 200 towards the Montana border.

=== Eastern segment ===
The 193-mile (311 km) Michigan segment of USBR 10 begins in Iron Mountain, and follows U.S. Route 2 across the southern portion of the Upper Peninsula. The route ends at an intersection with USBR 35 in St. Ignace, at the northern end of the Mackinac Bridge.

== History ==
Planning for a national bicycle touring route across the northernmost states of the United States began in the early 2000s, under efforts by the American Association of State Highway and Transportation Officials (AASHTO) to expand the United States Bicycle Route System, established in 1982 and not expanded since. The northern route, which had been marketed as the "Northern Tier" by Adventure Cycling, was identified in 2008 as a priority corridor for the renewed system and later numbered "USBR 10".

The first segment of USBR 10, located in the state of Washington and traveling along State Route 20, was approved in May 2014 by AASHTO. The 407-mile (655 km) segment, following State Route 20 from Anacortes to Newport, was dedicated in September. The Michigan segment was designated in November 2014, followed by the Idaho segment in May 2015. Completion of the Idaho segment was celebrated with a ribbon-cutting ceremony on October 11, 2015, in Sandpoint. A segment in Washington near the Idaho state line was realigned in 2018, shortening the route by 1.2 miles (1.9 km).

== Auxiliary routes ==
=== U.S. Bicycle Route 110 ===
U.S. Bicycle Route 110
- Location: Clark Fork, Idaho – Montana state line
- Length: 29.8 mi (48.0 km)
- Existed: 2017–present

U.S. Bicycle Route 110 is a spur route of USBR 10 in Idaho, traveling for 29.8 miles (48.0 km) on the north side of the Clark Fork River along Idaho State Highway 200 between Clark Fork and the Montana state line.

=== U.S. Bicycle Route 210 ===
U.S. Bicycle Route 210
- Location: Oldtown – Sandpoint, Idaho
- Length: 33.6 mi (54.1 km)
- Existed: 2017–present

U.S. Bicycle Route 210 is an alternate route to USBR 10 in Idaho, traveling on the south side of the Pend Oreille River between Oldtown and Sandpoint for 33.6 miles (54.1 km).

=== U.S. Bicycle Route 310 ===
U.S. Bicycle Route 310
- Location: Newport, Washington
- Length: 1.2 mi (1.9 km)
- Existed: 2018–present

U.S. Bicycle Route 310 is an alternate route to USBR 10 in Newport, Washington. It travels along U.S. Route 2 on Washington and Union avenues in downtown Newport. It was created in April 2018 and approved the following month by the American Association of State Highway and Transportation Officials.

=== U.S. Bicycle Route 410 ===
U.S. Bicycle Route 410
- Location: Oldtown – Sandpoint, Idaho
- Length: 50 mi (80 km)
- Existed: 2017–present

U.S. Bicycle Route 410 is an alternate route to USBR 10 in Idaho, traveling on the south side of the Pend Oreille River between Oldtown and Sandpoint for 50 miles (80 km). It follows U.S. Bicycle Route 210 for most of its length, with the exception of a 17.4-mile-long (28.0 km) stretch that follows the river to avoid U.S. Route 95.

=== U.S. Bicycle Route 610 ===
U.S. Bicycle Route 610
- Location: Sedro-Woolley, Washington
- Length: 2.1 mi (3.4 km)
- Existed: 2018–present

U.S. Bicycle Route 610 is an alternate route to USBR 10 in Sedro-Woolley, Washington. It travels along State Route 20 around the north end of downtown, intersecting USBR 87 and State Route 9. It was created in April 2018 and approved the following month by the American Association of State Highway and Transportation Officials.

=== U.S. Bicycle Route 10A ===
U.S. Bicycle Route 10A
- Location: Oldtown – Sandpoint, Idaho
- Length: 71 mi (114 km)
- Existed: 2015–2017

U.S. Bicycle Route 10A was an alternate route to USBR 10 in Idaho, traveling on the south side of the Pend Oreille River between Oldtown and Sandpoint for 71 miles (114 km). In 2017, it was replaced by U.S. Bicycle Routes 210 and 410.
