= U.S. Bicycle Route 95 =

Long-distance cycling route in the United States

U.S. Bicycle Route 95

Route information
- Existed: 2011–present

California section
- South end: San Diego near the Mexico–United States border
- Major intersections: USBR 50 in San Francisco, California; USBR 66 in Santa Monica, California
- North end: Oregon state line near Crescent City, California

Washington section
- South end: Skagit–Snohomish county line near Lake McMurray, Washington
- Major intersections: USBR 87 near Lake McMurray, Washington; USBR 10 in Burlington, Washington; USBR 87 near Alger, Washington; USBR 87 near Bellingham, Washington
- North end: Peace Arch Border Crossing in Blaine, Washington

Alaska section
- South end: Valdez, Alaska
- Major intersections: USBR 108 in Glennallen
- North end: USBR 8 in Delta Junction, Alaska

Location
- Country: United States
- States: California, Washington, Alaska

Highway system
- United States Bicycle Route System; List
← USBR 90	USBR 97 →

U.S. Bicycle Route 95 (USBR 95) is a U.S. Numbered Bicycle Route in California, Washington, and Alaska along the West Coast in the United States, that is also planned to run through Oregon. It has three designated sections in California, Washington, and Alaska. The first section, running from Valdez to Delta Junction in Alaska, was designated in May 2011.

== Route description ==
The Alaska section, between Valdez and Delta Junction, was approved by the American Association of State Highway and Transportation Officials (AASHTO) in May 2011 as part of the first major expansion of the U.S. Bicycle Route System since 1982. It has connections to U.S. Bicycle Route 8 in Delta Junction and U.S. Bicycle Route 108 in Glennallen. USBR 95 is planned to eventually form a continuous link along the West Coast between San Diego and Alaska.

The Washington section, connecting the Snohomish County Centennial Trail to the Peace Arch Border Crossing in Blaine, was designated in 2017. It includes two concurrencies with USBR 87 at its southern terminus and through the Bellingham area. The route also intersects USBR 10 in Burlington.

The California section, spanning 1,070 miles (1,720 km), runs from the Oregon state line north of Crescent City, to San Diego near the Mexico border, generally following California State Route 1 and U.S. Route 101 along the coast. The northern portion of the route to San Francisco was designated in 2021, and the remainder added in 2024.
