= U.S. Bicycle Route 66 =

U.S. cycling route

U.S. Bicycle Route 66

Route information
- Length: 1,024.4 mi (1,648.6 km)
- Existed: May 22, 2018–present

California section
- West end: USBR 95 in Santa Monica, CA
- East end: Arizona state line near Needles, CA

Oklahoma–Missouri section
- West end: Texas state line near Texola, OK
- Major intersections: USBR 76 in Marshfield, MO
- East end: Chain of Rocks Bridge in St. Louis, MO

Location
- Country: United States
- States: California, Kansas, Missouri

Highway system
- United States Bicycle Route System; List
← USBR 50A	USBR 70 →

U.S. Bicycle Route 66 (USBR 66) is a United States Bicycle Route that follows the former U.S. Route 66 (US 66) across the United States. The first section of the route, spanning 358 miles (576 km) between Baxter Springs, Kansas, and St. Louis, Missouri, was designated as USBR 66 in 2018. A second section was designated in 2021 between Santa Monica, California, and the Arizona state line near Needles, California. The Oklahoma section was designated in 2022, bringing the route to over 1,024 miles (1,648 km). The rest of the route remains proposed but not yet designated.

== Route description ==
Lengths
	mi	km
CA	239.8	385.9
OK	428.1	689.0
KS	12.9	20.8
MO	343.6	553.0
Total	1,024.4	1,648.6

USBR 66 runs along or parallel to former segments of US 66 for most of its route and also incorporates part of Bicycle Route 66, an Adventure Cycling Route Network corridor. At full length, the route is planned to run 2,493 miles (4,012 km) from Los Angeles to Chicago.

=== California segment ===
The route begins at the Santa Monica Pier in Santa Monica, California. It travels through Los Angeles and the Inland Empire on local streets and part of the Pacific Electric Trail before turning north to follow Interstate 215 and Interstate 15 towards the San Bernardino Mountains. USBR 66 follows Interstate 15 through Cajon Pass and into the high desert, turning east onto Interstate 40 in Barstow, California. It then follows the National Trails Highway to the Arizona state line southeast of Needles, where USBR 66 terminates.

=== Oklahoma–Missouri segment ===
==== Oklahoma ====
The western end of the route begins at the Texas state line at Texola, Oklahoma. It generally follows the historic alignment of US 66 to Oklahoma City with a notable diversion west of the city. Between Oklahoma City and Kansas the route trends northeast through Tulsa. It continues northeast through the Muscogee Nation and Cherokee Nation Indian reservations. The northeastern end is at the Kansas border near Miami, Oklahoma and Baxter Springs, Kansas.

==== Kansas ====
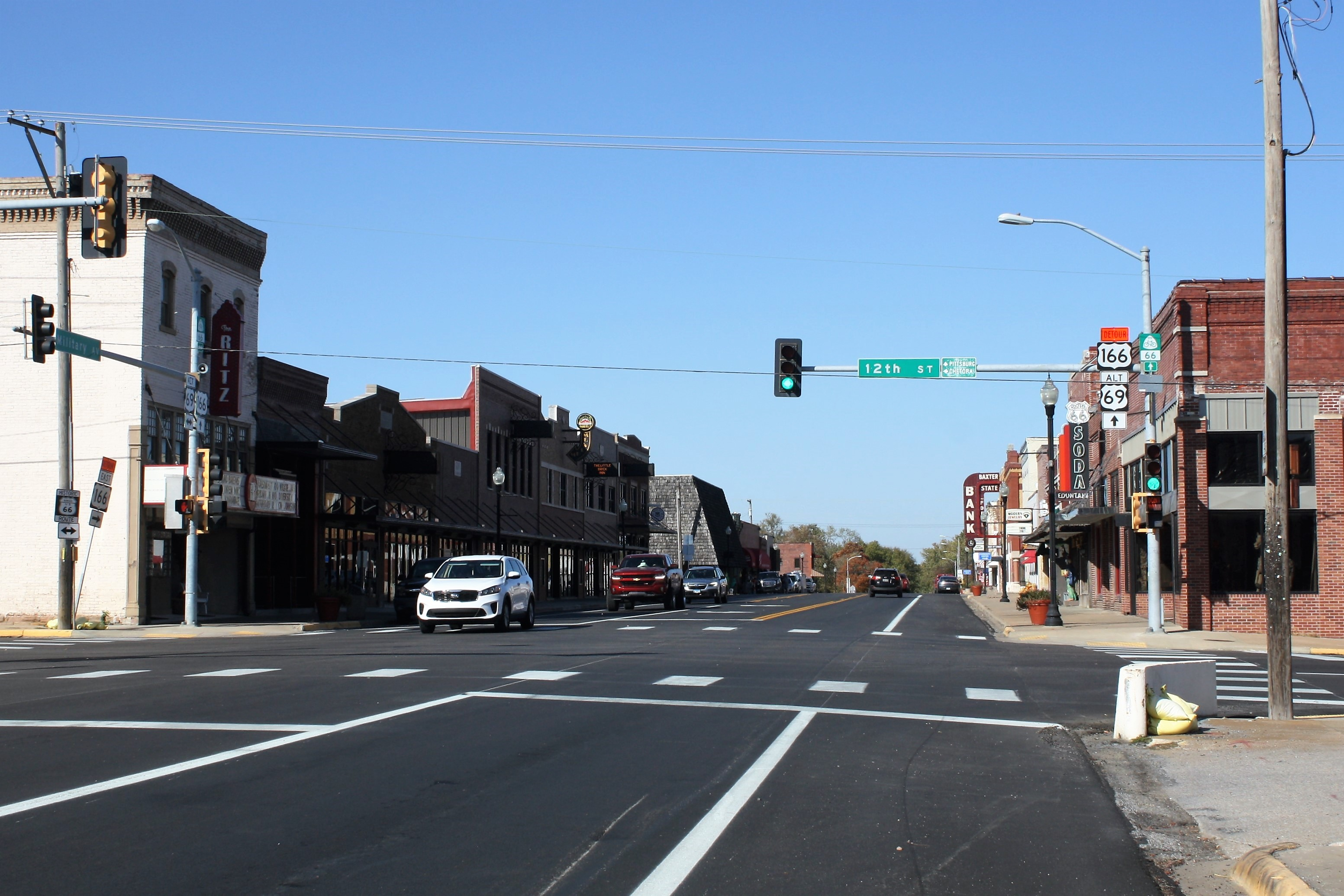
USBR 66 in downtown Baxter Springs, Kansas

The route begins at the Oklahoma state line south along US 69 Alternate south of Baxter Springs. It proceeds north along US 69 Alternate through downtown Baxter Springs before diverting to Willow Avenue to follow the old alignment of US 66. It turns east onto K-66 at Riverton and crosses the Spring River. In Galena, USBR 66 leaves K-66 and continues northeasterly on Front Street into Missouri.

==== Missouri ====
USBR 66 follows Highway 66 to Joplin, Missouri. It terminates at the Chain of Rocks Bridge, a pedestrian and bicycle bridge that crosses the Mississippi River into Illinois and carried automobiles as part of US 66.

== History ==
US 66 was created in 1926 as part of the U.S. Highway System and came to be known as the "Mother Road", appearing in various pieces of popular media. It was replaced by segments of the Interstate Highway System and decommissioned in 1985. Since then, the highway has been a popular tourist route and used by cities along its route for promotional campaigns.

The US 66 corridor had long been popular with long-distance cyclists, including tourists from outside the United States. State and local governments along the route had developed preserved sections of the old highway, along with nearby roads, into multi-use bicycle, pedestrian, and equestrian paths and trails, but the corridor lacked a national designation. Beginning in 2003, the American Association of State Highway and Transportation Officials (AASHTO) along with the Adventure Cycling Association developed a U.S. Bicycle Route network plan that was later approved by the former in 2008. The initial plan outlined a general corridor for U.S. Bicycle Route 66 between Los Angeles and Chicago. Earlier versions of the plan had omitted USBR 66, instead splitting it between other routes, or had an extended version that terminated in Wisconsin.

Cycling advocates and local tourism boards began campaigning for the official designation of USBR 66 in 2013, focusing first on Kansas and Oklahoma. The Adventure Cycling Association later published a bicycle route for the entire US 66 corridor in 2015 and began promoting a U.S. Bicycle Route designation for the corridor. In early 2018, the Missouri Department of Transportation and Missouri Federation Bike and Pedestrian Association began petitioning local governments and businesses for their support of the USBR 66 application. Officials in Kansas also submitted their own application. The designation was approved by AASHTO on May 22, 2018.

The Kansas and Missouri sections of USBR 66 was dedicated by transportation officials from both states on June 17, 2018, at Schifferdecker Park in Joplin, Missouri, and was commemorated with a six-day bicycle tour of the route.

The California section was approved by AASHTO in 2021.

The Oklahoma section was announced by Adventure Cycling Association on June 28, 2022. The first signs were installed on 11th Street in Tulsa in May 2023.
