= U.S. Bicycle Route 8 =

Long-distance cycling route in Alaska, US

U.S. Bicycle Route 8

Route information
- Length: 290.94 mi (468.22 km)
- Existed: 2011–present

Major junctions
- West end: Fairbanks
- USBR 97 in Fairbanks; USBR 95 in Delta Junction; USBR 108 in Tok
- East end: Canada–US border near Alcan Border

Location
- Country: United States
- States: Alaska

Highway system
- United States Bicycle Route System; List
← USBR 7	USBR 10 →

U.S. Bicycle Route 8 (USBR 8) is the northernmost U.S. Numbered Bicycle Route, which runs between Fairbanks and the Canada–US border in the state of Alaska in the United States.

== Route description ==
USBR 8 lies entirely within Alaska, and much of it follows the Alaskan Highway. It has two spur routes. The routes were approved by AASHTO in early May 2011, making them one of the first expansions of the U.S. Bike Route system since 1982. USBR 8 has connections to U.S. Bicycle Route 97 (USBR 97) in Fairbanks, U.S. Bicycle Route 95 (USBR 95) in Delta Junction, and U.S. Bicycle Route 108 in Tok.

== Auxiliary routes ==
=== U.S. Bicycle Route 108 ===
U.S. Bicycle Route 108
- Location: Tok – Anchorage, Alaska
- Length: 302 mi (486 km)
- Existed: 2011–present

U.S. Bicycle Route 108 is a spur of USBR 8 that follows Alaska Route 1 from Tok to Anchorage, at a junction with USBR 97. It connects to USBR 95 in Anchorage.

=== U.S. Bicycle Route 208 ===
U.S. Bicycle Route 208
- Location: Haines – Canadian border
- Length: 39 mi (63 km)
- Existed: 2011–present

U.S. Bicycle Route 208 is a spur of USBR 8 that follows the Haines Highway from the Alaska Marine Highway terminal in Haines to the Canadian border. Plans call for it to connect to the parent route in Haines Junction, Yukon.
