= U.S. Bicycle Route 81 =

United States Bicycle Route in Washington

U.S. Bicycle Route 81

Route information
- Length: 103.5 mi (166.6 km)
- Existed: 2021–present

Major junctions
- South end: Asotin, Washington
- USBR 20 in Clarkston, Washington; USBR 40 in Tekoa, Washington
- North end: Tekoa, Washington

Location
- Country: United States
- States: Washington

Highway system
- United States Bicycle Route System; List
← USBR 79	USBR 87 →

U.S. Bicycle Route 81 (USBR 81) is a United States Bicycle Route in the state of Washington. It is planned to travel north–south along the eastern edge of the state from Asotin to the Canadian border near Metaline Falls. The section from Asotin to Clarkston and Tekoa, spanning 103.5 miles (166.6 km), was designated in 2021. USBR 81 also has a child route, USBR 281, that was designated in 2021 and follows U.S. Route 195.

== Route description ==
USBR 81 begins in Asotin in southeastern Washington and uses a paved bike trail that follows State Route 129 (SR 129) along the Snake River. Under the Southway Bridge in Clarkston, it intersects USBR 20 and USBR 281, beginning a concurrency with the former. The route follows the Snake River waterfront around the east and north sides of Clarkston to the Red Wolf Crossing (part of SR 128), a bridge that carries USBR 81 over the Snake River after it splits from USBR 20.

The route then follows SR 193 and Wawawai Road along the north bank of the Snake River, turning southeast to climb Wawawai Canyon. USBR 81 continues northeast on SR 194 and Wawawai Road through Pullman, where it intersects USBR 281 near the Washington State University campus. The route leaves Pullman and follows SR 27 (part of the Palouse Scenic Byway system) through the city of Palouse and towards Garfield, where it turns east to follow local roads that parallel the Washington–Idaho state line. In Tekoa, USBR 81 intersects USBR 40 and turns northwest to rejoin SR 27 before terminating at the Spokane County line.

== History ==
USBR 81 was designated by the American Association of State Highway and Transportation Officials (AASHTO) in 2021, following an application from the Washington State Department of Transportation (WSDOT) for several routes in the Palouse region of southeastern Washington. The initial designation covered 103.5 miles (166.6 km) from Asotin to Tekoa, along with alternate route USBR 281. Conceptual plans from WSDOT call for the route to be extended northward through Spokane to the Canadian border near Metaline Falls, pending AASHTO approval.

== Auxiliary routes ==
=== U.S. Bicycle Route 281 ===
U.S. Bicycle Route 281
- Location: Uniontown – Pullman
- Length: 23 mi (37 km)
- Existed: 2021–present

U.S. Bicycle Route 281 (USBR 281) is a spur route of USBR 81 in Washington that serves as an alternate route between Clarkston and Pullman. Its initial section, designated in 2021 by the AASHTO, spans 23 miles (37 km) from the Idaho state line near Uniontown to USBR 81 in Pullman by following U.S. Route 195 and SR 27. Its southern terminus is at USBR 20 and USBR 81 near the Southway Bridge in Clarkston, and it is planned to travel through Lewiston, Idaho.
