= North Coast Inland Trail =

Trail project in Ohio, United States

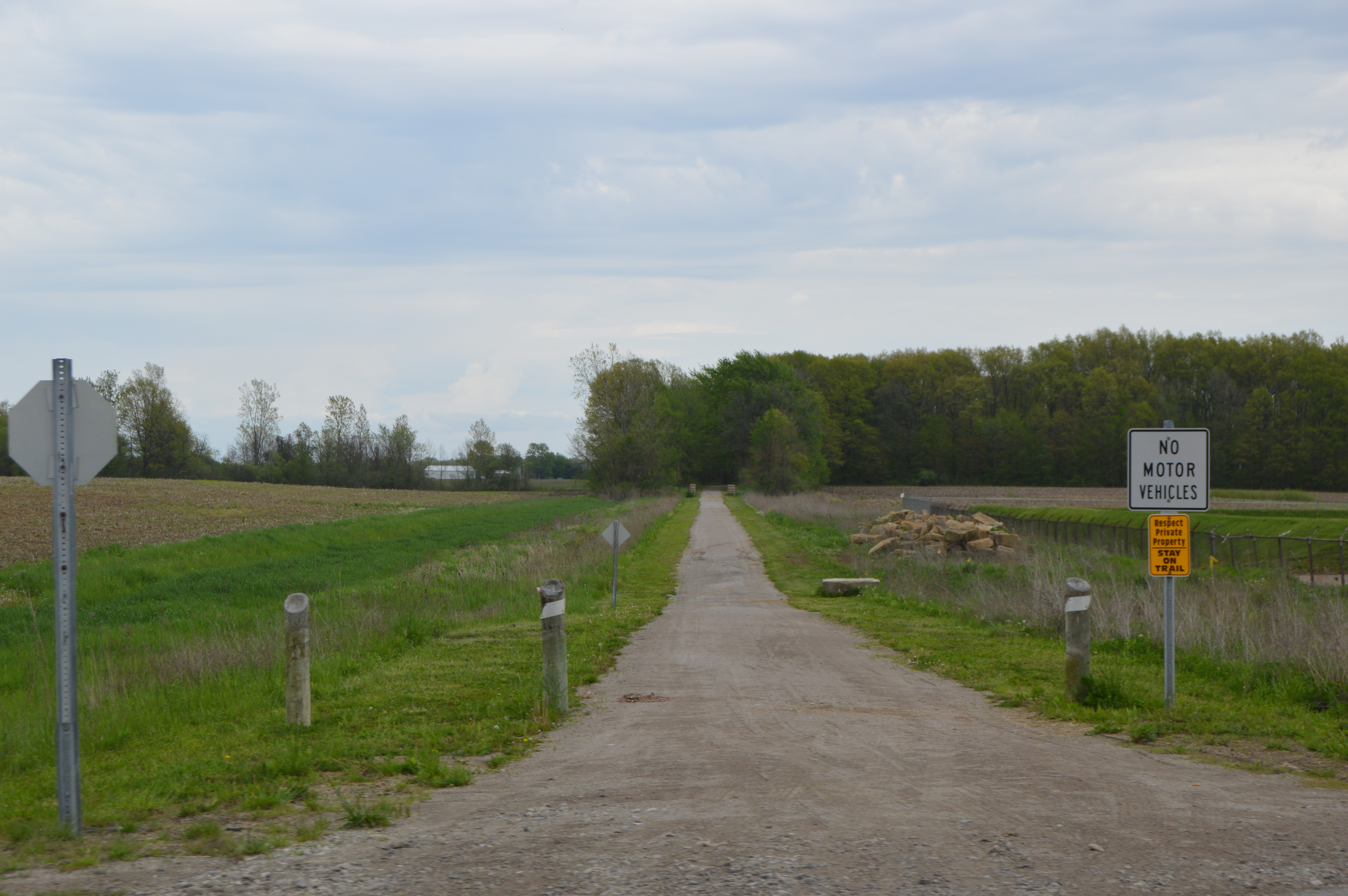
East of Norwalk in Huron County

The North Coast Inland Trail (often abbreviated as NCIT) is a work-in-process multipurpose trail project that currently consists of several separate portions, defined by their counties, in northern Ohio, United States. Affiliates with the trails have high hopes to connect all of these portions and to extend the trails into Indiana and Pennsylvania, two of Ohio's land-bordering states.

== History ==
Railroad Beginnings

The North Coast Inland Trail primarily follows a route built by the Toledo, Norwalk, and Cleveland Railroad (TN&C) from 1851 to 1853. This line was built during an intense competition with the Junction Railroad to be the first to connect Toledo and Cleveland, and ultimately fill the last remaining railroad gap connecting Chicago to Buffalo. Executives of the TN&C made a decision to bypass Woodville and Perrysburg and forge a line straight through the Black Swamp from Fremont to Toledo, saving crucial time and money by shortening the distance by eleven miles. The towns of Lindsey, Elmore, Genoa, and Millbury sprung up along the line as a result of this time-saving decision.

Several mile markers are still visible on the trail with a large "C" or "B," along with a number indicating how many miles remain until Chicago or Buffalo, respectively. The Toledo, Norwalk, and Cleveland Railroad completed their line first, tow

Junction Railroad eventually completed their line, situated along Lake Erie, and in 1853 the two rival companies merged to form the Cleveland & Toledo Railroad. This operation became part of the Lake Shore and Michigan Southern Railway in 1869 and eventually the New York Central Railroad.

The Junction Railroad's line became known as the Northern Division, and the original TN&C's line became known as the Southern Division. The Northern Division gained favor over time due to its shorter distance and the Southern Route was eventually abandoned.

During the 1980s several park districts and counties began an effort to convert the abandoned Southern Division into a multi-use pedestrian path. The North Coast Inland Trail Conservancy was created by supporters in Genoa and Elmore.

In 1992, several park districts agreed to create a series of connecting trails across the state of Ohio. The non-profit organization Firelands Rails to Trails, Inc. gave the project the collective name "North Coast Inland Trail" in 2000.

In 2008, the NCIT was extended from Fremont to Lindsey and Elmore.

In 2021 the latest section of the North Coast Inland Trail was finished, extending the western terminus of the trail from Elmore, Ohio to Genoa, Ohio.

In 2023 A small portion of the trail was completed that goes throughout the campus of Terra State Community College in Fremont, Ohio.

== Funding ==
The North Coast Inland Trail is mostly funded by the federal government, but is also partially funded by private organizations and local governments.

== Design ==
The trails are designed to cover many different landscapes, including farmland, urban areas, and forests. Many of the trails follow railroads. Some of these trails are paved over abandoned railways, while others follow alongside active railroads. Because of road obstacles, the trails themselves sometimes cut off before large cities and highways, and signs are placed throughout the open cities or areas, leading the followers to the next segment of the trails, which, in some cases, can be slightly hazardous.

The trails are also designed to "allow people within [counties] to easily move from community to community" and to "connect people and neighborhoods," as stated by Jim Ziemnik, the director of the Lorain County Metro Parks district. The convenience of the trails is also believed to help enhance the real estate appraisal of community homes near the trails.

== Portions ==
Because the North Coast Inland Trail is not yet complete, it is currently separated into several disconnected portions that are generally defined by specific counties. The North Coast Inland Trail also has many small and incomplete segments in many areas of northern Ohio besides in these four counties, such as in Wood County and Lucas County, which are planned to eventually be expanded and connected. The following are the four prominent portions of the project:

=== Huron County ===
The Huron County portion of the trails is about 20 miles long and extends from Bellevue, through Monroeville and Norwalk to Collins. This portion is not completely paved; some parts are dirt trails. This portion of the trail is constructed over what were several abandoned railways managed by several defunct railroad companies. The Huron County portion was the first trail to be labeled as a part of the North Coast Inland Trail, and was established by and is maintained by the nonprofit organization Firelands Rails to Trails.

=== Lorain County ===
The Lorain County portion of the trails is 29 miles long, is completely paved, and extends from Lake Erie in Lorain to Elyria to Oberlin to Kipton to the county line. From Lorain through Elyria, the trail goes through parks (Black River Reservation and Cascade Park) and on streets. The trail west of Elyria particularly follows several abandoned railways. This portion of the trails was established by and is managed by the park district Lorain County Metro Parks.

=== Sandusky County ===
The Sandusky County portion of the trails is 27 miles long, is completely paved, and extends from Bellevue to the Ottawa County city of Genoa. The segment of this trail that extends from Bellevue to Clyde was built in 2012. Part of the Sandusky County trail follows an active railroad, and at one point also runs on a bridge across the Sandusky River in the city of Fremont. This portion of the trails was established by and is managed by the Sandusky County Park District.

=== Ottawa County ===
The Ottawa County portion of the NCIT is about 6.75 miles long and extends from the county line through Elmore to Genoa, currently ending at a trailhead on Washington Street in Genoa's Veterans Park. The Park District of Ottawa County is working on extending the NCIT to Millbury in Wood County. The next phase of the NCIT is to be constructed from Washington Street to 9th Street, through downtown Genoa. This phase is expected to be completed in 2027.

== Plans of expansion ==
The project's eventual objective is to connect the state of Indiana to the state of Pennsylvania with a large bike trail, but the project has not at all yet extended to either of these states. However, users of the trails can also connect to one of these states if they take other nearby, unrelated trails.

There are also many improvement and expansion plans for the current Ohio trails. The Lorain County Metro Parks district in Lorain County has done improvements to the Lorain County portion that cost hundreds of thousands of dollars, which Ziemnik said "was not a financial risk for [them]."

An example of a recently added extension of the trails is the Huron County portion's extension, which leads through the entire city of Norwalk in order to eventually connect into a planned trail segment in Erie County. This portion is not a paved trail, but leads followers through the city using green-painted curbs, which is unique to any other segment of the project.

The most recent extension to the trail project is a 1.8-mile gravel trail in Lorain County that follows an abandoned railroad, which is planned to later be paved over and connected to the prominent trail in Lorain County.

The Ohio Department of Transportation has proposed that most of the trail be designated as a part of USBR 30, a federal bicycle route that will eventually span much of the Northern United States linking Ohio with the Northwestern United States and New England.

== Regulations ==
The trails are always open, and the trail regulations allow biking, walking, and inline skating. However, they do not allow motor vehicles, with the exception of staff, ranger, and handicap service vehicles. The regulations also do not allow skateboards.

== Events ==
A yearly marathon is held exclusively in Elyria on the North Coast Inland Trail called the Inland Trail Marathon. The results of the marathon are split between male and female participants.

In 2006, more than 150 cyclists took a 3-day bicycle trek starting from Williams County, Ohio near the Indiana borderline and ending at Oberlin, Ohio. One of the trails that this trek underwent was the Lorain County portion of the North Coast Inland Trail.

In October 2014, a geocaching event was held in Lorain County. Some of the geocaches were hidden along the North Coast Inland Trail.

== See also ==
- Ohio River Trail
- Ohio to Erie Trail
