= U.S. Bicycle Route 87 =

Cycling route in Washington and Alaska in the United States

U.S. Bicycle Route 87

Route information
- Length: 87 mi (140 km)
- Existed: 2011–present

Northern segment
- South end: Skagway, AK
- North end: Canada–US border at Skagway - Fraser Border Crossing

Southern segment
- South end: Skagit–Snohomish county line
- Major intersections: USBR 95 near Lake McMurray, WA; USBR 10 in Sedro-Woolley, WA; USBR 95 near Alger, WA; USBR 95 near Bellingham, WA
- North end: Canada–US border at Sumas, WA

Location
- Country: United States

Highway system
- United States Bicycle Route System; List
← USBR 79	USBR 90 →

U.S. Bicycle Route 87 (USBR 87) is a U.S. Numbered Bicycle Route in Washington and Alaska in the United States, that is planned to extend south along the West Coast to California. As of 2017, the segments in northern Washington and southeastern Alaska have been added to the system, running a total of 87 miles (140 km).

== Route description ==
The Alaska segment runs between Skagway and the Canada–US border near Carcross, Yukon, along the Klondike Highway. It was approved by AASHTO in early May 2011, making it one of the first expansions of the U.S. Bike Route system since 1982. It is planned to eventually follow the Alaska Marine Highway from Skagway to Bellingham, Washington.

The Washington segment was designated in 2017 and runs north from the Skagit–Snohomish county line to the Canadian border at Sumas. It follows State Route 9 to Sedro-Woolley, where it intersects USBR 10 and turns northwestward towards Interstate 5 and Lake Samish. The route continues into Fairhaven and Bellingham, passing the Alaska Marine Highway terminal and downtown Bellingham, before turning northeast towards Everson. In nearby Nooksack, USBR 87 rejoins State Route 9, following the highway to Sumas.
