= List of Georgia State Bicycle Routes =

Georgia State Bicycle Routes
- Route markers
- State: Georgia State Bicycle Route X (SBR X)

System links
- Georgia State Highway System; Interstate; US; State; Special

The following is a list of Georgia State Bicycle Routes. These routes are designated by the Georgia Department of Transportation.

== History ==
Georgia established a numbered bicycle route system of 14 routes in the mid-1990s. Two of the routes, 15 and 95, are to become incorporated into the United States Numbered Bicycle Routes system as U.S. Bicycle Route 15 and U.S. Bicycle Route 1 respectively.

== List of routes ==
=== State Bicycle Route 5 ===
State Bicycle Route 5
- Location: Lake Seminole-Lookout Mountain
- Length: 408 mi (657 km)

Georgia State Bicycle Route 5 (Chattahoochee Trace) runs 408 miles (657 km) from Lake Seminole north to the Tennessee border in Lookout Mountain, running through the western part of the state. The route passes through Blakely, Fort Gaines, Lumpkin, Cusseta, Columbus, Greenville, Newnan, Carrollton, and Rome.

=== State Bicycle Route 10 ===
State Bicycle Route 10
- Location: Lake Seminole-Jekyll Island
- Length: 246 mi (396 km)

Georgia State Bicycle Route 10 (Southern Crossing) runs 246 miles (396 km) from Lake Seminole east to Jekyll Island, running through the southern part of the state. The route passes through Bainbridge, Cairo, Thomasville, Quitman, Valdosta, Lakeland, Waycross, Nahunta, and Brunswick.

=== State Bicycle Route 15 ===
State Bicycle Route 15
- Location: Lake Park-Acworth
- Length: 327 mi (526 km)

Georgia State Bicycle Route 15 (Central) runs 327 miles (526 km) from the Florida border south of Lake Park north to Acworth. The route roughly follows the I-75 corridor south of the Atlanta area before bypassing the Atlanta area to the west. The route passes through Valdosta, Tifton, Ashburn, Cordele, Vienna, Perry, Warner Robins, Macon, Forsyth, Barnesville, Fayetteville, Palmetto, and Lithia Springs.

=== State Bicycle Route 20 ===
State Bicycle Route 20
- Location: Blakely-Waycross
- Length: 195 mi (314 km)

Georgia State Bicycle Route 20 (Wiregrass) runs 195 miles (314 km) from Blakely north to Waycross, passing through Leesburg, Ashburn, Fitzgerald, and Douglas.

=== State Bicycle Route 35 ===
State Bicycle Route 35
- Location: Savannah-Rossville
- Length: 428 mi (689 km)

Georgia State Bicycle Route 35 (March to the Sea) runs 428 miles (689 km) from Savannah northwest to the Tennessee border in Rossville, passing through Statesboro, Millen, Louisville, Sandersville, Milledgeville, Eatonton, Madison, Atlanta, Marietta, Calhoun, and Ringgold.

=== State Bicycle Route 40 ===
State Bicycle Route 40
- Location: Columbus-Savannah
- Length: 269 mi (433 km)

Georgia State Bicycle Route 40 (TransGeorgia) runs 269 miles (433 km) from the Columbus area east to Savannah, passing through Butler, Fort Valley, Warner Robins, Dublin, Soperton, and Metter.

=== State Bicycle Route 45 ===
State Bicycle Route 45
- Location: Ellerslie-Atlanta or Palmetto
- Length: 124 mi (200 km)

Georgia State Bicycle Route 45 (Little White House) runs 124 miles (200 km) from Ellerslie north to two separate branches to Atlanta and Palmetto, passing through Woodbury and Fayetteville.

=== State Bicycle Route 50 ===
State Bicycle Route 50
- Location: Thomson-Augusta
- Length: 39 mi (63 km)

Georgia State Bicycle Route 50 (Augusta Link) runs 39 miles (63 km) from Thomson east to Augusta.

=== State Bicycle Route 55 ===
State Bicycle Route 55
- Location: Suwanee-Robertstown
- Length: 63 mi (101 km)

Georgia State Bicycle Route 55 (Appalachian Gateway) runs 63 miles (101 km) from Bike Route 70 near Suwanee north to Robertstown, passing through Gainesville and Cleveland.

=== State Bicycle Route 60 ===
State Bicycle Route 60
- Location: Grayson-Elberton
- Length: 86 mi (138 km)

Georgia State Bicycle Route 60 (Athens Link) runs 86 miles (138 km) from Bike Route 70 near Grayson east to Elberton, passing through Winder, Watkinsville, and Athens.

=== State Bicycle Route 70 ===
State Bicycle Route 70
- Location: Acworth-Snellville
- Length: 66 mi (106 km)

Georgia State Bicycle Route 70 (Northern Crescent) runs 66 miles (106 km) from Acworth east to Snellville, bypassing Atlanta to the north. The route passes through Alpharetta and Lawrenceville.

=== State Bicycle Route 85 ===
State Bicycle Route 85
- Location: Savannah-Dillard
- Length: 314 mi (505 km)

Georgia State Bicycle Route 85 (Savannah River Run) runs 314 miles (505 km) from Savannah north to the North Carolina border in Dillard, running through the eastern part of the state. The route passes through Springfield, Sylvania, Millen, Thomson, Washington, Elberton, Hartwell, Toccoa, and Clayton.

=== State Bicycle Route 90 ===
State Bicycle Route 90
- Location: Cloudland Canyon-Tallulah Falls
- Length: 210 mi (340 km)

Georgia State Bicycle Route 90 (Mountain Crossing) runs 210 miles (340 km) from Cloudland Canyon east to Tallulah Falls, running through the northern part of the state. The route passes through La Fayette, Dalton, Chatsworth, Ellijay, and Dahlonega.

=== State Bicycle Route 95 ===
State Bicycle Route 95
- Location: Kingsland-Clyo
- Length: 169 mi (272 km)

Georgia State Bicycle Route 95 (Coastal) runs 169 miles (272 km) from the Florida border near Kingsland north to the South Carolina border near Clyo, running through the coastal area of the state. The route passes through Woodbine, Brunswick, Darien, Savannah, and Springfield.
