= Sombra–Marine City (Bluewater) Ferry =

Coordinates: 42.7123°N 82.4835°W

The Sombra – Marine City (Bluewater) Ferry was a ferry service that crossed the St. Clair River, connecting Sombra, Ontario in Canada on the eastern bank with Marine City, Michigan in the United States on the western bank.

Vehicles accessed the ferry from Lambton County Road 33/St. Clair Parkway (a former alignment of Highway 40) in Sombra or from Highway M-29 in Marine City. In Sombra on the Ontario/Canadian side, the dock was on King Street. On the Michigan/American side, the dock was on South Water Street.

In July, 2013 the ferry was charging a toll of $7.00 (CAN or US) for an automobile. The first departure from Sombra was 6:40 AM, and from Marine City was 7:00 AM.

== Ferry vessels ==
The Bluewater Ferry operated two vessels, the Daldean of Chatham and the Ontamich. The Daldean of Chatham was larger and could carry 12 car-equivalents or two semi-trailer trucks, while the Ontamich, launched 1939, was capable of ferrying 9 car-equivalents or one semi-trailer truck.

== Closings ==
Occasionally during the winter months the ferry was temporarily unable to operate because of heavy ice buildup on one shore or the other.

On January 11, 2018, ice floe damage to the ferry's causeway caused the service to cease all operations. Repairs, estimated to cost four million dollars, were never completed due to cost.

A proposed sale of the business fell through in 2019 as the US government was unwilling to commit to reopening the border station at Marine City.

The two ferry boats were sold in July 2020. A $6 million lawsuit against the Canadian government, filed in April 2019, remained pending at that time.
