= Mississippi River Trail =

Long-distance bicycle route

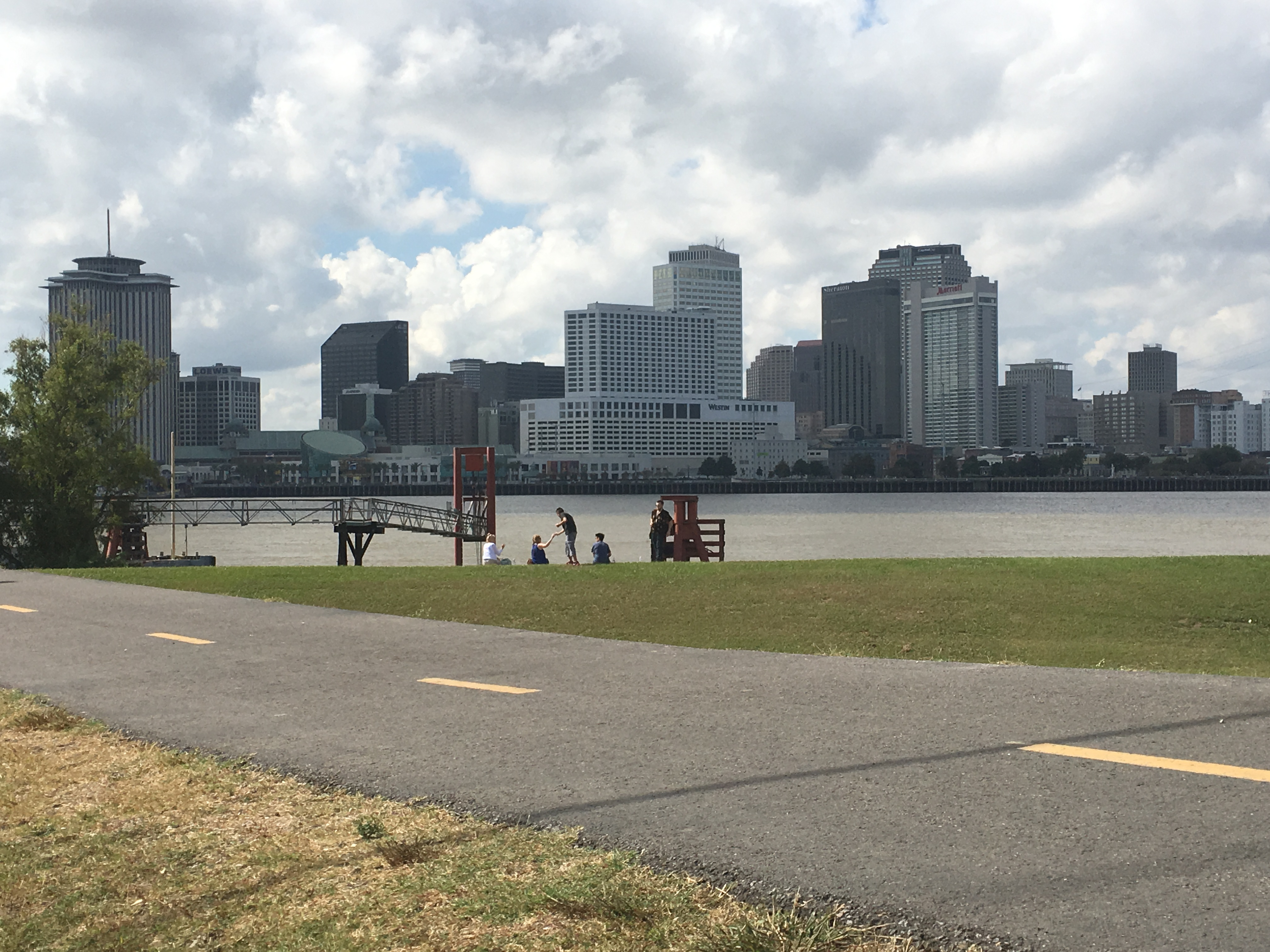
- The Mississippi River Trail in Algiers Point, Louisiana, with a view of the Mississippi River, French Quarter, New Orleans skyline.
- Length: 3,000 miles (4,800 km)
- Location: Several U.S. states
- Designation: USBR 45; Mississippi River Trail
- Trailheads: Itasca State Park, Minnesota; Venice, Louisiana
- Surface: Paved

The Mississippi River Trail (abbreviated MRT) is a designated bicycle and pedestrian trail that traverses the shores of the Mississippi River in the United States. The trail extends from the headwaters at Lake Itasca in Minnesota to near the mouth of the river in Venice, Louisiana. Much of the trail's 3,000 miles (4,800 km) follows roadways used by motor vehicles, although some of the route is on multi-use trails. The segment in Minnesota has been designated as U.S. Bicycle Route 45 (USBR 45), part of the U.S. Bicycle Route System.

== Designation and signage ==
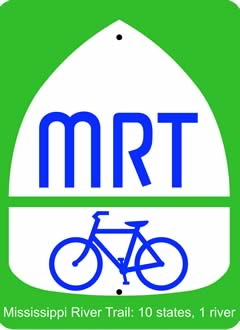
Mississippi River Trail sign

The Mississippi River Trail route marker is based on a 2012 design that the Federal Highway Administration (FHWA) has allowed several states, including Illinois, Kentucky, and Tennessee, to use as U.S. Bicycle Route markers. The design features a green background with a white triangle and a bicycle symbol. However, the Mississippi River Trail's marker bears the abbreviation "MRT" in place of a numeric route designation.

The portion of the Mississippi River Trail in Minnesota was designated as U.S. Bicycle Route 45 in 2013. Long-range plans call for the rest of the MRT to be designated as USBR 45, and for the southernmost segment near New Orleans to be concurrently designated as USBR 51.

By the time the Minnesota Department of Transportation (MnDOT) successfully proposed designating the MRT as USBR 45, planning for the trail was already well underway. Local trail partners did not want to spend additional funds and weaken the MRT brand by installing the USBR signs – a requirement for USBR designation – alongside the MRT signs. MnDOT secured approval from the Federal Highway Administration to display only the MRT shield for the time being.

== Route description ==
The trail is divided into three sections: Northern, Central, and Southern. In some locations trails are along both sides of the river.

=== Northern section ===
==== Minnesota ====
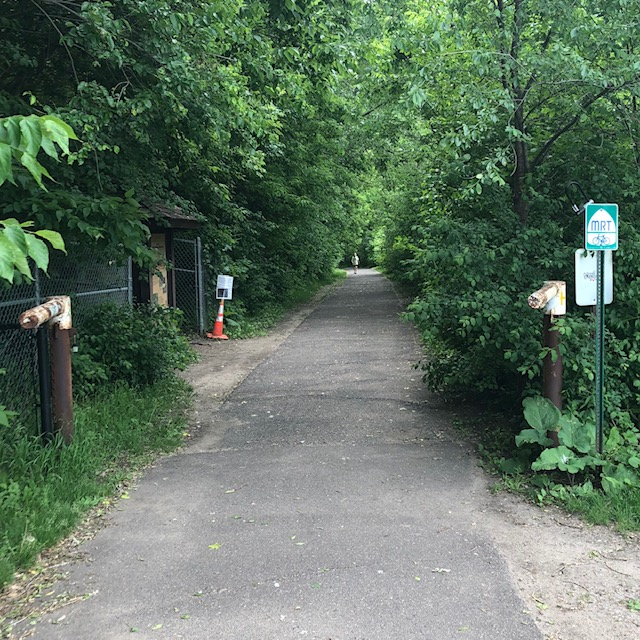
The north entrance of Minnehaha Trail, a signed portion of the MRT in the Minneapolis-St. Paul area.

The MRT begins at Itasca State Park, near the headwaters of the river. Itasca State Park also contains more than 20 miles (32 km) of paved biking trails. After it leaves the park, the MRT winds north along the river, traversing county roads to the city of Bemidji. Here the main trail connects to a number of city and regional trails. From Bemidji, the MRT heads southeast along the Paul Bunyan Trail, a state-developed rail-trail conversion. This 100-mile-long (160 km) paved trail extends from Bemidji to Brainerd.

From Brainerd, the MRT follows county roads, some with marked bike lanes and some with paved shoulders, through the cities of Little Falls and St. Cloud. South of St. Cloud, the surroundings become more urban as the rider approaches the Twin Cities, Minneapolis and St. Paul. The route through the two cities passes the Mississippi National River and Recreation Area that includes St. Anthony Falls, Minnehaha Falls Regional Park, and Fort Snelling State Park, among other protected areas and parks. In Minneapolis, MRT segments appropriate the established Grand Rounds National Scenic Byway trails and Minnehaha Trail. South of St. Paul, the MRT passes through several smaller cities before reaching Lake Pepin. The route passes through Wabasha and Winona on its way to the Wisconsin state line.

==== Wisconsin ====
The Wisconsin section of the MRT begins at Prescott and continues along the eastern side of the river all the way to Illinois. The section north of Prairie du Chien primarily follows the Great River Road, while the section south follows various state and county highways. The Wisconsin Department of Transportation has prepared an online publication, The Great River Road Mississippi River Trail Bicycle Map: A Guide for Cycling Along Wisconsin's Great River, which offers a detailed section by section guide of the Wisconsin route complete with road maps, services, campgrounds and route descriptions. It's opened in 2025

==== Iowa ====
The Iowa section of the MRT follows the west bank of the Mississippi River for roughly 328 miles between Minnesota and Missouri. Entering from Minnesota near Lansing, Iowa, the route uses a mix of low-traffic highways and local roads along the Upper Mississippi River valley, connecting river towns near Pikes Peak State Park, then continuing downstream to the city of Dubuque with its riverfront parks and historic districts. South of Dubuque, the trail remains largely on-road as it passes through rural countryside and small towns in Jackson and Clinton counties before reaching the urbanized riverfront of the Iowa Quad Cities, where paved off-road paths carry cyclists along the Mississippi through Buffalo, Davenport, and Bettendorf, including continuous riverfront greenways and access through parks such as Credit Island.

Downstream from the Quad Cities, the MRT follows near Iowa 22 and other state and county highways through Muscatine County, serving the riverfront city of Muscatine and nearby natural areas before continuing through to Burlington, where short riverfront trail segments and city streets combine to keep the alignment close to the river. In far southeastern Iowa, the trail follows the byway through Lee County, connecting Fort Madison and Keokuk before reaching the Missouri state line; throughout the state, the Iowa Mississippi River Parkway Commission and local partners have identified the MRT as a priority multi-county bicycle corridor, with long-term plans to improve shoulders, add separated paths where feasible, and enhance connections to parks, wildlife refuges, and historic and cultural sites along the river.

=== Central ===
==== Illinois ====
The Illinois section begins at the Wisconsin-Illinois border near Galena, Illinois and ends at the Southern tip of Illinois in Cairo, Illinois. The trail passes through the cities of Moline, Rock Island, Nauvoo, and Quincy. Additionally, it passes near the Cahokia Mounds State Historical Site close to East St. Louis, Illinois. Bicycling non-profit Ride Illinois produced a trail guide with The Illinois Department of Natural Resources in 2004 covering 585 miles and breaking the trip into 11 segments. This guide identifies traffic patterns along the mixed roadways which include Illinois Route 84, Illinois Route 96, Illinois Route 127, and U.S. Route 51. The Mississippi River Trail crosses the American Discovery Trail twice in Illinois: in the North near Rock Island and in the South near East St. Louis.

==== Missouri ====
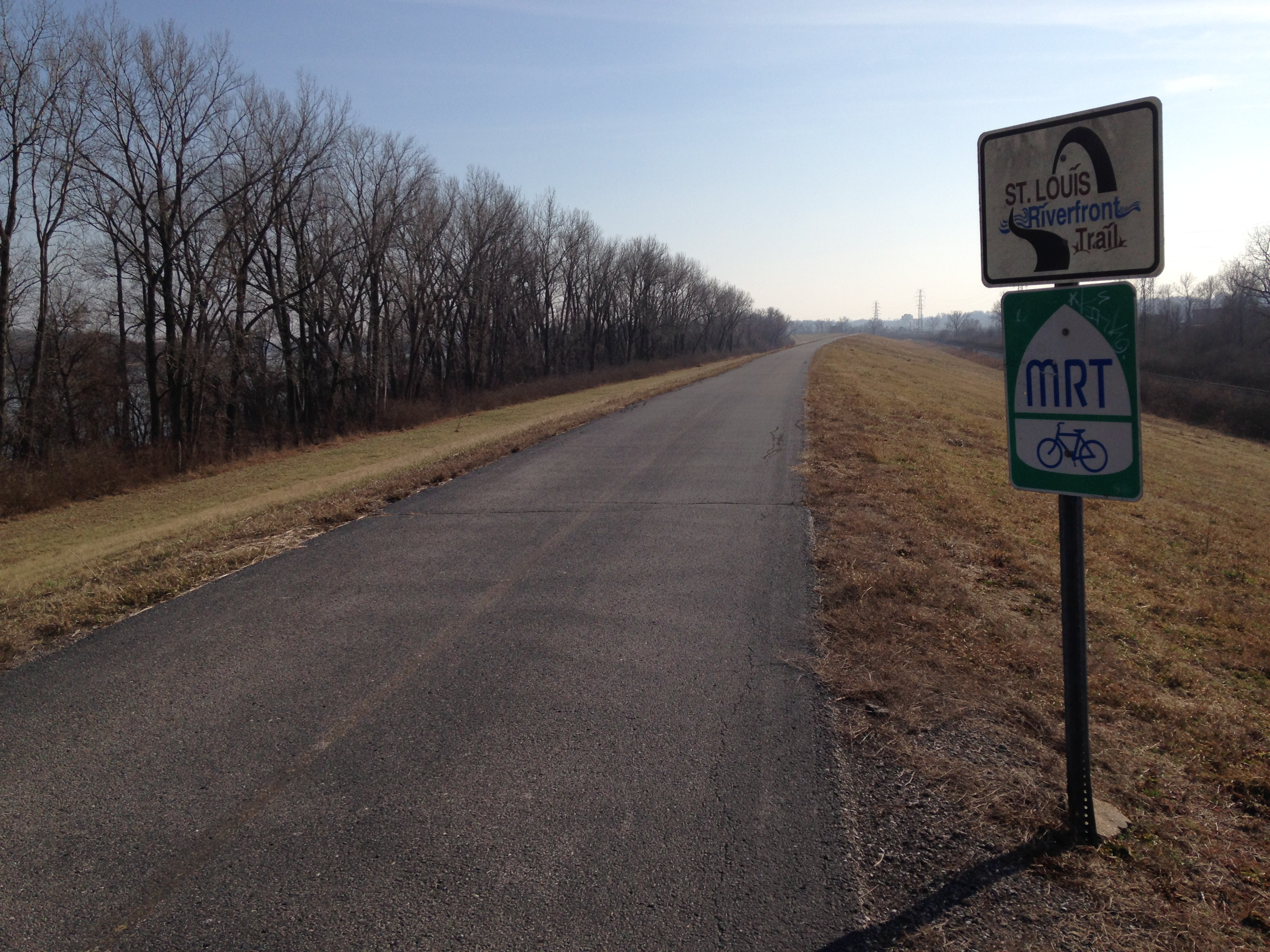
St. Louis Riverfront Trail and Mississippi River Trail, St. Louis, Missouri

The St. Louis Riverfront Trail follows the Mississippi River for 12 miles from the Chain of Rocks Bridge south along the levee to a point past the Gateway Arch.

=== Southern ===
==== Tennessee ====
The trail enters Obion County from Kentucky along State Route 157 (SR 157) and then turns right onto SR 22 traveling southwesterly. The trail goes along the eastern boundary of Reelfoot National Wildlife Refuge. Near Samburg, the trail turns right onto SR 21 and follows the south shore of Reelfoot Lake. It also passes near Reelfoot Lake State Park.

The trail enters into Lake County and turns left onto Bluebank Road, right onto Wynnburg–Keefe Road, left onto Madie Church to Keefe Road, right onto Madie Thompson Road, left onto Madie Road, and right onto Gratio Road, entering the town of Ridgely, Tennessee. Through Ridgely, the trail travels along Poplar Street, Main Street, and Depot Street (Levee Road). From here, the trail travels along SR 181, also known as Great River Road.

The trail enters Dyer County and crosses over Interstate 155 (I-155). It continues south on SR 181 for several miles until it crosses over the Forked Deer River and into Lauderdale County, Tennessee. From here, the trail continues east on SR 88 and turns right onto Porter's Gap Road. Then the trail turns right onto Edith–Nankipoo Road and right onto Hobe Webb Road, traveling near the Chickasaw National Wildlife Refuge. The trail turns left onto Chisholm Lake Road, right onto Craig School Road (turning into Turkey Hill Road), and then left onto SR 19. Then the trail turns right onto Lightfoot Luckett Road then right onto SR 87, then left onto SR 371. The trail turns right onto Cooper Creek Road and then right onto U.S. Route 51 (US 51), crossing into Tipton County over the Hatchie River.

Continuing south along US 51, the trail turns right onto Leigh's Chapel Road, left onto Flat Iron Road (turning into Simmons Street), right onto Murphy Avenue (turning into Bride Road), left onto Garland Drive, and right onto Garland Detroit Road (turning into Detroit Road, then Jamestown Road, then Randolph Road), following the top ridge of the 2nd Chickasaw Bluff. Passing through the town of Randolph, Tennessee, the trail turns right onto Needham Road and right onto SR 59. The trail then turns south onto Richardson Landing road, turns right onto Pryor Road (turning into Bluff Road), and makes a left in order to stay on Bluff Road. The trail turns right onto Quito–Drummonds Road and right onto Ray Bluff Road, entering Shelby County.

The trail continues south along Ray Bluff Road (turning into New Bethel Road), right onto Bass Road, right again onto New Bethel Road, right onto West Union Road, right onto Herring Hill Road, and straight onto Riverbluff Road (turning into Bluff Road). The trail travels along the ridge of the 3rd Chickasaw Bluff and passes through Meeman-Shelby Forest State Park. In the community of Shelby Forest, Tennessee, the trail turns right onto Benjestown Road, right onto Island Forty Road (turning into Ramsey Road), and right back onto Benjestown Road. Then the trail turns left onto South Circle Road (turning into East Circle Road), right onto Northaven Drive, and right onto SR 388 (North Watkins Street), passing through the Northaven area and crossing over the Loosahatchie River into the Frayser community of Memphis.

Once in Memphis, the route turns right onto Millington Road, right onto Carrolton Road, left onto Benjestown Road, and right onto Whitney Avenue, passing by General DeWitt Spain Airport and over the Wolf River. The trail turns south onto North Mud Island Road (turning into Island Drive) and passes through the Harbortown neighborhood. Then the trail turns left onto A.W. Willis Avenue over Wolf River Harbor, right onto Front Street (passing next to the Pyramid Arena), passes under I-40 and the Hernando De Soto Bridge, turns right onto Jefferson Avenue, and left onto Riverside Drive, entering Downtown Memphis. From here, the trail continues south on Riverside Drive, passing by Mud Island, the MATA Trolley riverfront loop, and the South Bluffs neighborhood. The trail goes along the paths in Tom Lee Park and the Riverwalk Trail system in Downtown Memphis.

After this, the official trail is unclear. According to the MRT website, the trail travels under the Harahan Bridge and the Frisco Bridge, up the side of the 4th Chickasaw Bluff, and onto a sidewalk on the Memphis-Arkansas Bridge. A route following the South side of the Memphis-Arkansas bridge from E.H. Crump park has been documented. Construction has been completed on a multi-use trail for pedestrians and cyclists along the north side of the Harahan bridge.

== See also ==
- Great River Road
