= List of BicyclePA bicycle routes =

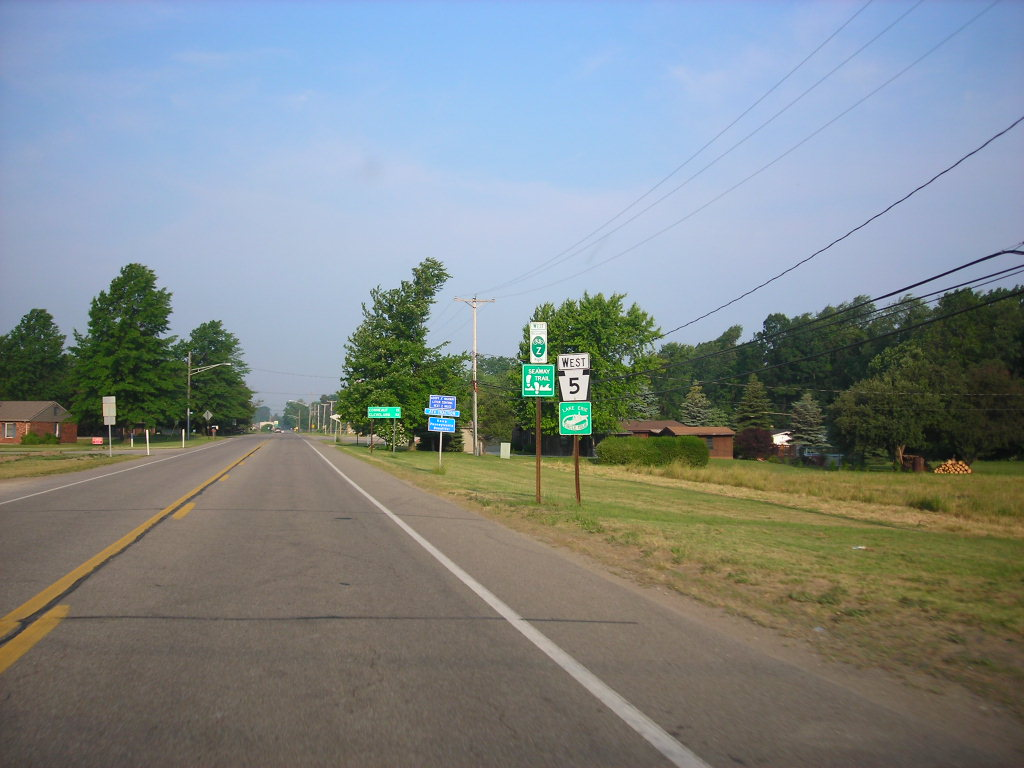
BicyclePA Route Z along Pennsylvania Route 5 in Erie County, which is also part of the Seaway Trail, Lake Erie Circle Tour, and U.S. Bicycle Route 30

In the U.S. state of Pennsylvania, BicyclePA bicycle routes are a series of bicycle routes created in the 2000s to cross the state on highways and rail trails.

== Routes ==
=== BicyclePA Route A ===
BicyclePA Route A
- Location: Mount Morris-Erie

BicyclePA Route A runs from the West Virginia border south of Mount Morris in Greene County north to Presque Isle State Park on Lake Erie in Erie. The route runs through the western part of the state, passing through the Pittsburgh area.

=== BicyclePA Route E ===
BicyclePA Route E
- Location: Marcus Hook-Morrisville

BicyclePA Route E runs from the Delaware border in Marcus Hook, Delaware County north to the New Jersey border at the Delaware River in Morrisville, Bucks County, passing through the city of Philadelphia. The route is Pennsylvania's part of the East Coast Greenway.

=== BicyclePA Route G ===
BicyclePA Route G
- Location: Palo Alto-Lawrenceville

BicyclePA Route G runs from the Maryland border south of Palo Alto, Bedford County north to the New York border in Lawrenceville, Tioga County. The route runs through the central mountains of the state, passing through numerous stream valleys. It passes through Pine Creek Gorge, also known as the Grand Canyon of Pennsylvania, in Tioga County along the Pine Creek Rail Trail.

=== BicyclePA Route J ===
BicyclePA Route J
- Location: New Freedom-South Waverly

BicyclePA Route J runs from the Maryland border in New Freedom, York County north to the New York border in South Waverly, Bradford County. The route runs through the central part of the state, and it follows the Susquehanna River throughout much of the state. North of Harrisburg, Route J oftentimes utilizes area freeways such as US 11/US 15 and US 22/US 322. The route utilizes the York County Heritage Rail Trail between York and the Maryland border, where it connects to the Torrey C. Brown Rail Trail, which heads south towards the Baltimore, Maryland area.

==== BicyclePA Route J1 ====
BicyclePA Route J1
- Location: Harrisburg-Lancaster

BicyclePA Route J1 is a spur route which connects to Route J in Harrisburg. It runs southeast until it connects to BicyclePA Route S in Lancaster.

==== BicyclePA Route J2 ====
BicyclePA Route J2
- Location: Fairplay-Harrisburg

BicyclePA Route J2 is a spur route which connects to Route J in Harrisburg. It runs through Gettysburg National Military Park and continues until the Maryland border just south of Fairplay.

=== BicyclePA Route JS ===
BicyclePA Route JS
- Location: Arendtsville-Hanover Junction

BicyclePA Route JS, established in 2013, is an east–west connector route between BikePA Routes J and S. It runs from Arendtsville, where it connects with BikePA Route S, to Hanover Junction, where is connects with BikePA Route J on the York County Heritage Rail Trail. Along the way, the route passes through Gettysburg and Hanover.

=== BicyclePA Route L ===
BicyclePA Route L
- Location: Chadds Ford-Lanesboro

BicyclePA Route L runs from the Delaware border south of Chadds Ford in Chester County, where it connects to Delaware Bicycle Route 1, north to the New York border north of Lanesboro, Susquehanna County where it connects to New York State Bicycle Route 11. The route runs through the eastern part of the state, passing through the Lehigh Valley and the Scranton/Wilkes-Barre area.

==== BicyclePA Route L1 ====
BicyclePA Route L1
- Location: Mertztown-Trexlertown

BicyclePA Route L1 is a spur route which connects to Route L in Mertztown. The route runs northeast to Trexlertown.

=== BicyclePA Route S ===
BicyclePA Route S
- Location: West Alexander-Washington Crossing

BicyclePA Route S runs from the West Virginia border in West Alexander, Washington County east to the New Jersey border at the Delaware River in Washington Crossing, Bucks County. The route passes through the southern part of the state, passing to the south of Pittsburgh, passing through York and Lancaster, and passing to the north of Philadelphia. It utilizes the Youghiogheny River Trail in western Pennsylvania, which is part of the Great Allegheny Passage. Between West Newton and Rockwood, Route S follows U.S. Bicycle Route 50 along the Great Allegheny Passage.

==== BicyclePA Route S1 ====
BicyclePA Route S1
- Location: Arendtsville-Gettysburg

BicyclePA Route S1 is a spur route which connects to Route S in Arendtsville, and runs southeast until it connects with BicyclePA Route J2 in Gettysburg.

=== BicyclePA Route V ===
BicyclePA Route V
- Location: Bessemer-Portland

BicyclePA Route V runs from the Ohio border west of Bessemer, Lawrence County east to the New Jersey border at the Delaware River in Portland, Northampton County. The route passes through the central part of the state, roughly following the Interstate 80 corridor throughout the state.

=== BicyclePA Route Y ===
BicyclePA Route Y
- Location: Pymatuning Lake-Lackawaxen

BicyclePA Route Y runs from the Ohio border at the Pymatuning Lake in Crawford County east to the New York border at the Delaware River in Lackawaxen, Pike County. The route passes through the rural northern part of the state, roughly following U.S. Route 6. In 2018, BicyclePA Route Y was incorporated into U.S. Bicycle Route 36.

==== BicyclePA Route Y1 ====
BicyclePA Route Y1
- Location: Wilsonville-Matamoras

BicyclePA Route Y1 is a spur route in Pike County which connects to Route Y southeast of Wilsonville and runs east along U.S. Route 6, crossing the Delaware River into New York at Matamoras, where it connects to New York State Bicycle Route 209.

=== BicyclePA Route Z ===
BicyclePA Route Z
- Location: West Springfield-North East

BicyclePA Route Z, which is entirely located in Erie County, runs from the Ohio border west of West Springfield to the New York border east of North East, where it connects to the Seaway Trail. The route parallels Lake Erie through the northwestern corner of the state, passing through the city of Erie. In 2018, BicyclePA Route Z was incorporated into U.S. Bicycle Route 30.
