= Tanner, Kentucky =

Unincorporated community in Kentucky, United States

- Unincorporated community
- Location in Kentucky Location in the United States
- Coordinates: 37°30′34″N 85°47′6″W
- Country: United States
- State: Kentucky
- County: LaRue
- Elevation: 823 ft (251 m)
- Time zone: UTC-6 (Central (CST))
  - Summer (DST): UTC-5 (CST)
- GNIS feature ID: 509184

Tanner is an unincorporated community located in LaRue County, Kentucky, United States. This small community is part of a region that includes several other unincorporated places and towns, nearby communities include Hodgenville.
