= Adventure Cycling Route Network =

System of bicycle routes in US and Canada

The Adventure Cycling Route Network, developed by Adventure Cycling Association since 1974, comprises over 52,000 miles of routes for bicycle touring in the U.S. and Canada and is the largest such network in North America.

== Overview ==
The Adventure Cycling Route Network consists of mostly rural bicycle routes varying in length from loops of a few hundred miles to coast-to-coast routes of more than 4,000 miles. The routes eschew high-traffic roads and big cities for rural two-lane highways and small towns. Routes have been designed to allow for daily stops for food, supplies, and lodging.

== History ==
Adventure Cycling's first route was the TransAmerica Bicycle Trail, which they developed leading up to the 1976 Bikecentennial celebration.

== United States Bicycle Route System ==
Adventure Cycling is the only national organization providing staff support to develop the United States Bicycle Route System (USBRS), which when complete will comprise over 50,000 miles of bicycle routes connecting urban, suburban, and rural areas throughout the U.S.

== Routes ==
- Adirondack Park Loop
- Allegheny Mountains Loop
- Arkansas High Country Route
- Atlantic Coast Bicycle Route
- Bicycle Route 66
- Chicago to New York City Bicycle Route
- Florida Connector
- Grand Canyon Connector
- Great Divide Mountain Bike Route
- Great Parks Bicycle Route
- Great Rivers South Bicycle Route
- Green Mountains Loop
- Idaho Hot Springs Mountain Bike Route
- Lake Erie Connector
- Lewis & Clark Trail Bicycle Route
- North Lakes Bicycle Route
- Northern Tier Bicycle Route
- Pacific Coast Bicycle Route
- Parks, Peaks, and Prairies Bicycle Route
- Sierra Cascades Bicycle Route
- Southern Tier Bicycle Route
- Tidewater Potomac Heritage Bicycle Route
- TransAmerica Bicycle Trail
- Underground Railroad Bicycle Route
- Utah Cliffs Loop
- Washington Parks Bicycle Route
- Western Express Bicycle Route

== See also ==
- Cycling network – Interconnected network of cycle routes
