= The Cookie Lady =

The Cookie Lady may refer to:

- The Cookie Lady (short story), a short story by Philip K. Dick
- June Curry, resident of Afton, Virginia, known for providing refreshments and shelter to long-distance bicyclists
