= Great Parks Bicycle Route =

Bike route between the US and Canada

The Great Parks Bicycle Route is a two-part bicycle touring route developed and mapped by Adventure Cycling Association. Great Parks North runs 751.5 miles (1209.4 km) from Jasper, Alberta, Canada, to Missoula, Montana, U.S. Great Parks South extends 694.5 miles from Steamboat Springs, Colorado, to Durango, Colorado. When combined with a portion of the TransAmerica Bicycle Trail, the Great Parks Route can be ridden continuously from Jasper to Durango for a total mileage of 2512 miles (4042.6 km). The route passes through Jasper National Park, Banff National Park, Kootenay National Park, and Waterton Lakes National Park in Canada. Crossing into the United States, the route passes through Glacier National Park, Yellowstone National Park, Grand Teton National Park, Rocky Mountain National Park, Black Canyon of the Gunnison National Park, and Mesa Verde National Park before arriving in Durango.

== Provinces and states ==
1. Alberta
2. British Columbia
3. Montana
4. Wyoming
5. Colorado

== See also ==
- Bicycle touring
- Adventure Cycling Route Network
