= TransAmerica Bicycle Trail =

First bicycle touring route to cross the U.S.

The TransAmerica Bicycle Trail is the first bicycle touring route to cross the US It was developed and mapped by Adventure Cycling Association, and travels between Astoria, Oregon, and Yorktown, Virginia, along mostly rural, two-lane highways.

== History ==
The TransAmerica Bicycle Trail began as the route for Bikecentennial, a mass bicycle tour across the country to celebrate the US Bicentennial in 1976. The route was developed and mapped in the years preceding the event by volunteers and staff members of the organization Bikecentennial, which changed its name to Adventure Cycling Association in 1993. Over 4,100 cyclists rode at least part of the route during Bikecentennial, with 2,000 riding the entirety of the TransAmerica Bicycle Trail. Most of the riders were in their 20s and had no experience with long-distance cycling. They traveled in groups of 10 to 12 with leaders trained by Bikecentennial.

Since 2014, the annual Trans Am Bike Race is held on the route.

== Route ==
Map of the TransAmerica Bicycle Trail across the United States.

The route can generally be ridden between May and September and requires about two and a half months, depending on the rider’s average daily mileage. The current route length is 4,228 miles (6,804 km). The TransAmerica Bicycle Trail was originally mapped with the intention of riding eastbound, but many riders choose to ride westbound. The route goes through several national parks such as Yellowstone and Grand Teton; small cities like Missoula, MT, and Carbondale, IL; and historical sites, especially at the route’s end in Yorktown, VA, in the Historic Triangle.

== Terrain ==
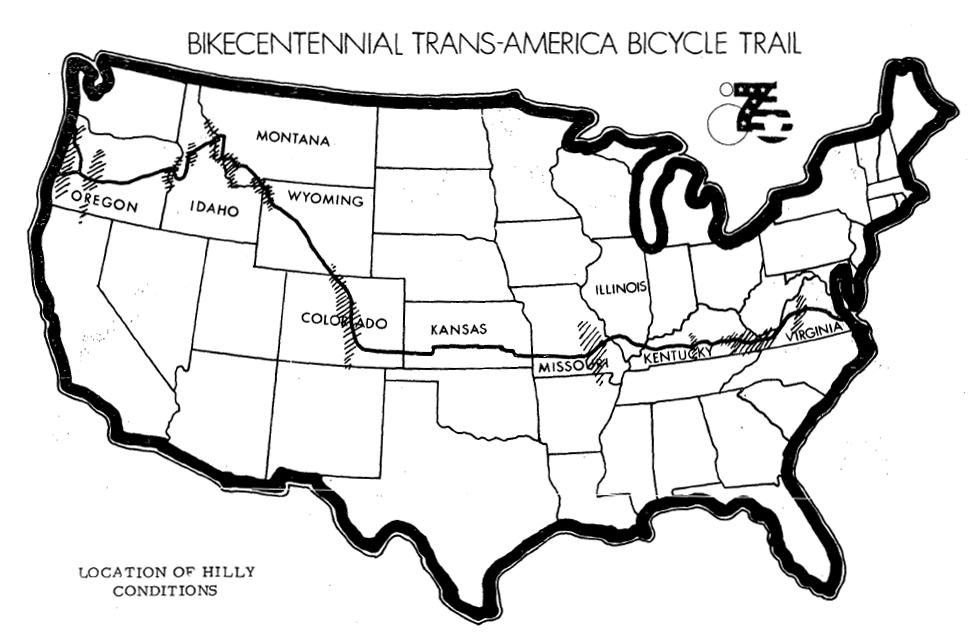
Map of hilly conditions on the Trans-America Bicycle Trail, from a 1978 U.S. Department of Transportation report.

Some stretches of the western portion of the route follow large river valleys, but the route generally includes frequent climbing between Astoria, Oregon, and Pueblo, Colorado. The Rocky Mountain portions of the route include long mountain passes, including Lolo Pass, Togwotee Pass, and Hoosier Pass.

The route crosses the flatter terrain of the Great Plains in eastern Colorado and Kansas. East of the plains, the route becomes hillier through the Ozarks of Missouri and the Appalachian region of eastern Kentucky and western Virginia. Adventure Cycling's route data shows the Berea, Kentucky, to Christiansburg, Virginia, section as having the highest average climb per mile of the main route.

The route primarily uses rural roads and avoids most large cities, though it passes through several regional centers, including Eugene, Oregon; Missoula, Montana; Pueblo, Colorado; and Carbondale, Illinois.

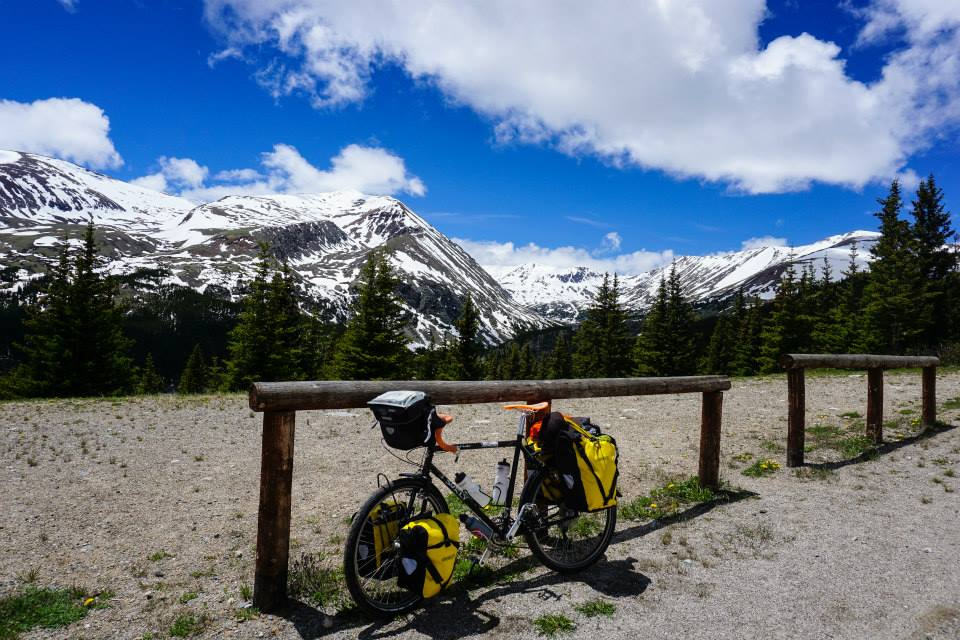
A loaded touring bike parked near the highest point on the route- Hoosier Pass in Colorado

== States ==
The TransAmerica Bicycle Trail takes riders through the following states:

- Oregon
- Idaho
- Montana
- Wyoming
- Colorado
- Kansas
- Missouri
- Illinois
- Kentucky
- Virginia

== See also ==
- Adventure Cycling Route Network
