= Bicycle Route 66 =

Part of Adventure Cycling Route Network

Bicycle Route 66 is a bicycle touring route, developed and mapped by Adventure Cycling Association, that largely parallels the original U.S. Route 66, also known as the Mother Road, from Chicago, Illinois, to Santa Monica, California.

== Route ==
At 2,485.7 miles (4,000.3 km), Bicycle Route 66 largely follows the original U.S. Route 66, which now exists in sections as Historic Route 66.

== Terrain ==
Bicycle Route 66 varies in terrain from flat prairie, to rolling hills, to vast expanses of desert.

== States ==
Bicycle Route 66 takes riders through the following states:

- Illinois
- Missouri
- Kansas
- Oklahoma
- Texas
- New Mexico
- Arizona
- California

== See also ==
- Adventure Cycling Route Network
