= Atlantic Coast Bicycle Route =

Cycle route in the United States

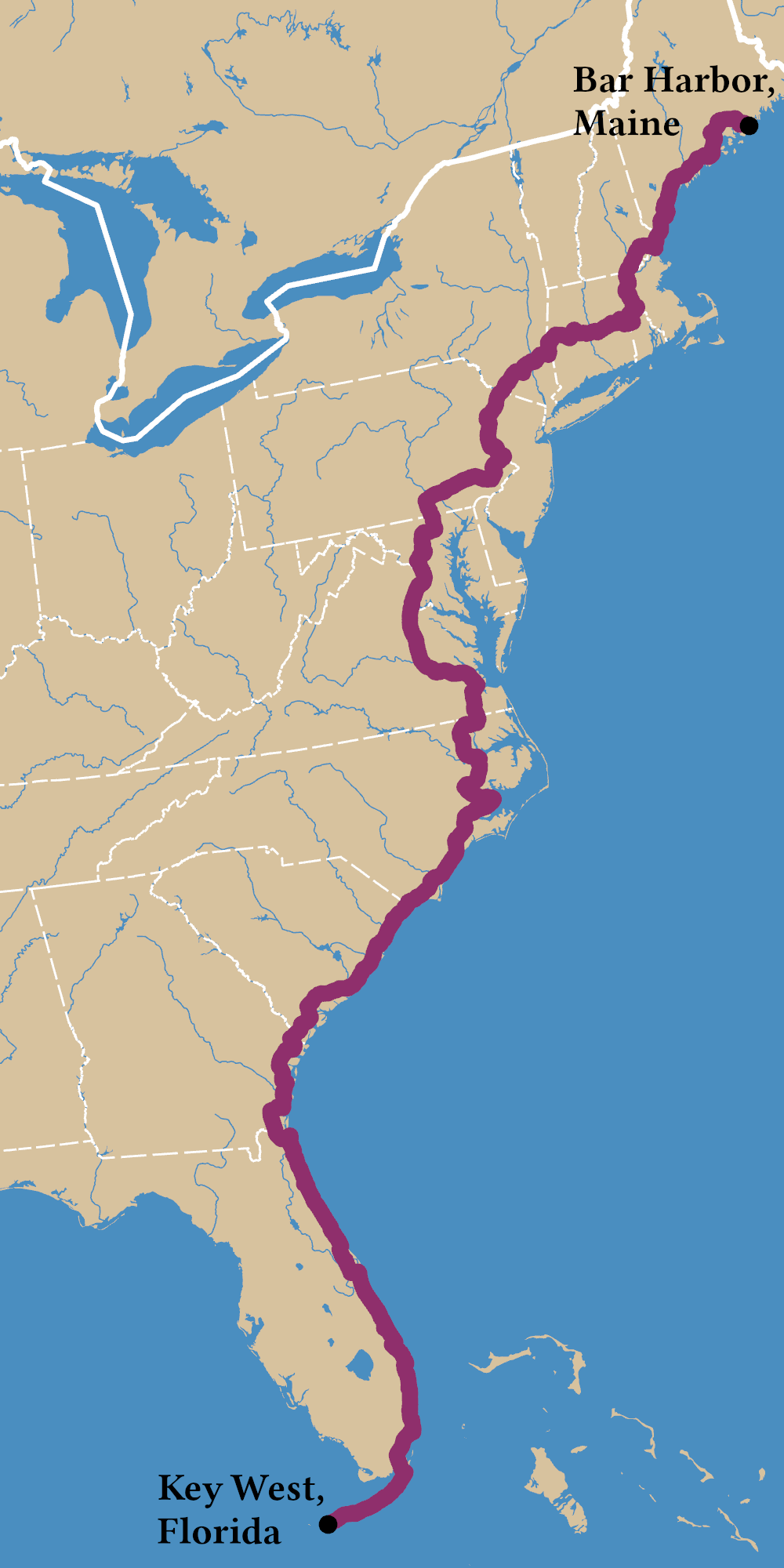
Map of the route

Adventure Cycling Association's Atlantic Coast Bicycle Route is a 2,615-mile-long (4,208 km) bicycle touring route traversing the East Coast of the United States. The route has two connecting segments, extending nearly the entire length of the nation's eastern margin. The northern section of the route features historic New England coastal villages and towns, rural countrysides, and Amish farmlands. The route's southern section begins after the Mason–Dixon line (the boundary between Pennsylvania and Maryland) and is notable for the Civil War battlefields in Fredericksburg, Virginia, and the city of Richmond, Virginia. The northern section of the route can be ridden between late spring and late fall, and the southern section can be ridden year-round.

== Northern section ==
The route begins in Bar Harbor, Maine, on Mount Desert Island, and proceeds through Acadia National Park. After crossing the Penobscot River, there is a side trip to well-preserved, nineteenth century Fort Knox. The route occasionally follows back roads situated near the Maine coast, but only a small portion of the route is along the Atlantic coastline. The route continues through charming, picturesque New England towns of New Hampshire, Massachusetts, and Connecticut with an optional 30-mile (48 km) detour into Boston.

Riders pass through scenic farmland as they bike through New York along the historic Hudson River. The route through New Jersey follows the Delaware River and picturesque Delaware Water Gap National Recreation Area. An optional spur extends eastward to New York City from Lambertville. The route heads west into Pennsylvania through hilly farmland. A bike trail along the Schuylkill River provides an optional spur to downtown Philadelphia. After riding through Valley Forge National Historic Park, riders enter Amish country. The route swings south into Maryland though the western outskirts of Baltimore with an alternate route through the city. Northern Maryland farmland transitions into the suburban sprawl of the Washington, D.C. Metropolitan Area.

Bike paths through Rock Creek Park take riders to the Lincoln Memorial and the Potomac River. After crossing the Potomac, there is another bike path to Mount Vernon, George Washington's residence from 1754 until his death in 1799. There are more urban areas in expanding northern Virginia, some quiet country roads, and an increase in urbanization on the approach to Richmond, Virginia.

=== Terrain ===
The route consists of many hilly areas with steep grades, including northwestern Connecticut, the Susquehanna River area in Pennsylvania, and the country roads north of Richmond. Cycling enthusiasts have identified areas, such as along the Potomac River in Virginia, as flatter compared to other regions.

=== Logistics ===
Services are generally plentiful along the route. People who like to camp won't find any campgrounds in Maryland, unless they take the alternate route through Baltimore. Some cyclists may want to do the northern portions of this route during the colors of autumn. If so, call ahead to verify campground availability, as many close after Labor Day. If staying indoors, make advance reservations.

== Southern section ==
This segment provides the opportunity to bike through the Deep South and travel through back-road farmlands and swamps and near Baptist churches. The route leaving Richmond heads south through the farmlands of Virginia and encounters swamps while crossing into North Carolina.

On an Outer Banks alternate route, riders bike along the sandy beaches of the Atlantic Ocean. The winds can be strong and sand may blow onto the road. The winds are thought to have encouraged the Wright Brothers to fly their first plane here. Riders may see tools utilized by the famous Wright brothers in their bicycle shop. The Outer Banks alternate route requires two ferry rides, one of which is 2.25 hours long.

Heading southward, the route passes through the busy city of Wilmington, North Carolina, and takes another ferry ride into Southport, North Carolina. Next come farmlands, swamps and the Francis Marion National Forest. There is an optional 34-mile (55 km) spur into historic Charleston, South Carolina. There are more farms and swamps in Georgia. Another optional spur takes riders into Savannah, Georgia, with one of the largest national historic landmark districts in the United States. Okefenokee National Wildlife Refuge is four miles off route. It is one of the largest and most primitive swamps remaining in the United States. Riders can see numerous alligators of all sizes, stroll on boardwalks over the marshes, or take a boat ride through the swamp.

Heading south, the route skirts around the northeast corner of Jacksonville, Florida, into highly developed areas of Florida popular with tourists and retirees. It then turns into beach riding along the Atlantic Ocean to the distinctive Spanish architecture of St. Augustine, the oldest European settlement in the United States. From St. Augustine, the route alternates between urban and suburban conditions most of the way down the coast through Miami. Cyclists who don't wish to reverse their route back across the Keys may take a ferry from Key West to Fort Myers Beach, and return to Fort Lauderdale via the Florida Connector Bicycle Route.

=== Terrain ===
While there is some hill climbing upon leaving Richmond, Virginia, generally the terrain is either rolling or flat.

=== Logistics ===
This route can be ridden year-round; however, the northern part can be quite cool in the winter. Expect high temperatures and humid conditions in the summer, though beach riding will be tempered by ocean breezes. Changing local conditions make it difficult to predict any major wind patterns. Hurricanes can occur from July through November along the Atlantic Seaboard and can close roads along the Outer Banks alternate route. Space is limited on the ferries, so when making reservations, riders need to let them know in advance that they have a bike. Services are readily available throughout most of the ride, although camping opportunities can be scarce in the suburban and residential areas of Florida. Camping on the Outer Banks can be blustery at night. There are no bike shops between Southport, North Carolina, and Statesboro, Georgia, unless taking the spur into Charleston, South Carolina. Almost everything available for purchase, including food, will be more expensive due to the tourist nature of the beach communities In Florida. Reservations for camping and hotel accommodations are highly recommended year-round. Riders wishing to stay at one of the Bahia Honda State Park campsites should make reservations early.

Riders can take advantage of the opportunities to enjoy the numerous beach accesses. County parks often include amenities, such as picnic tables, cold water, showers, and toilets, which are inexpensive or free to cyclists. State Highway A1A changes names many times on its journey along the coast. This is especially true as it nears Miami. Often it is located adjacent to an aquatic preserve or wildlife refuge that offers bird watching. Florida has an extensive, though sometimes confusing, network of bicycling facilities ranging from two-foot bike lanes or shoulders to separated bike paths and sidewalks. For some stretches it may be better to use the sidewalk rather than the road, but in highly trafficked beach areas the sidewalks will be for pedestrian use only. Approaches to nearly invisible short bridges are usually marked with "frogs", "buttons", "turtles", "slugs", or rumble strips. Campgrounds are almost non-existent from Jupiter until south of Miami. After Florida City, there is a 29-mile (47 km) ride with no services, potentially heavy traffic, and abundant alligators. Gators should always be given a wide berth, and riders must be ready to sprint if necessary. Alligators can reach speeds of 35 miles per hour for very short distances.

On the way to Key West, the roadways have shoulders, though the bike paths are recommended. Riders should take plenty of time to enjoy this section and have a camera ready as there are multiple opportunities to stop and take in the scenery when crossing the old bridges. Information centres containing local knowledge of available activities are offered at each of the Keys.

== States on the Atlantic Coast Bicycle Route ==
1. Maine
2. New Hampshire
3. Massachusetts
4. Connecticut
5. Rhode Island
6. New York
7. New Jersey
8. Pennsylvania
9. Maryland
10. Virginia
11. North Carolina
12. South Carolina
13. Georgia
14. Florida

== See also ==
- Bicycle touring
- League of American Bicyclists
- Adventure Cycling Route Network
