= Adventure Cyclist magazine =

Adventure Cyclist is an association magazine published bimonthly by Adventure Cycling Association in Missoula, Montana.

== History ==
Adventure Cycling, then called Bikecentennial, published a newsletter called BikeReport beginning in 1974. In 1975 it was established as a magazine. It was redesigned as a newsprint tabloid in 1978 and published six times annually until 1985, when it was increased to nine annual issues. BikeReport changed its name to Adventure Cyclist for the April 1994 issue. The magazine underwent further redesigns in 1998 and again in 2013. In 2023, for the 50th volume of the magazine, Adventure Cyclist launched another redesign. It was the first redesign in ten years and the first ever to be completed completely in-house. This redesign brought the magazine back to six issues per years, increased page count to 76 pages per issue, and transitioned from saddle-stitch binding to perfect-bound.

In November 2015 Alex Strickland was named the editor-in-chief of the magazine. In April 2021, Carolyne Whelan took over the roll of editor-in-chief for the magazine.

== Overview ==
Adventure Cyclist publishes stories, photos, and essays about bicycle travel in the U.S. and around the world. They also publish bike and gear reviews, technical articles, and guides. The magazine's current circulation is about 115,000. According to the magazine's latest (2022) U. S. Postal Service form PS-3500, the number of hardcopy issues mailed to paid subscribers is about 55,000.

== Open Road Gallery ==
A recurring piece in the magazine, the Open Road Gallery features photos by Greg Siple, cofounder of Adventure Cycling, of bicycle travelers who visit the Missoula headquarters.
