= Lewis & Clark Trail Bicycle Route =

Bicycle touring route in the U.S.

The Lewis & Clark Bicycle Trail is a bicycle touring route created by Adventure Cycling Association to commemorate the bicentennial of the 1804–1806 Corps of Discovery Expedition. The route follows the path of Meriwether Lewis and William Clark as they explored the Louisiana Purchase and the Pacific Northwest.

== Route ==
The Lewis & Clark Bicycle Trail starts in Hartford, Illinois, close to where the Lewis and Clark Expedition began in St. Charles, Missouri. Since the expedition traveled primarily by boat, the bicycle route follows their path along the Missouri and Columbia rivers as much as possible.

The route has 4,589 mapped miles and includes a number of optional spurs, detours, and even Clark's eastbound return path after the expedition had split into two parties at Traveler's Rest in Lolo, Montana. The more historically accurate route, though, is 3,143 miles.

== Terrain ==
The main route varies from paved roads, bike paths, unpaved rail trails, and gravel roads. The route's elevation varies from flat plains to hilly sections in the mountains.

== Logistics ==
Rough, gravel roads along the route may require off-road tires. A water filter may be necessary as many of the campsites are primitive, and the route can be ridden from May through September.

== Sponsors ==
The Lewis & Clark Bicycle Trail was recognized by the National Council of the Lewis & Clark Bicentennial as part of the nationwide celebration.

Adventure Cycling received funding from REI for the Lewis & Clark Bicycle Trail.

== States on the trail ==
1. Illinois
2. Missouri
3. Kansas
4. Nebraska
5. Iowa
6. South Dakota
7. North Dakota
8. Montana
9. Idaho
10. Washington
11. Oregon

== See also ==
- Bicycle touring
- Adventure Cycling Route Network
