= America on Parade =

Disneyland and Magic Kingdom parade

America on Parade ("AOP") was a parade created for Disneyland and the Magic Kingdom for the United States Bicentennial and for Disneyland's 20th and The Magic Kingdom's 5th anniversaries.

It was created under the direction of Disneyland's Director of Entertainment, Bob Jani. The parade float units were designed by New York theatrical designer Peter Larkin. The first run was in the summer of 1975 and was originally designed to run through 1977, to commemorate the United States Bicentennial. America On Parade ran once during the afternoon and again just prior to the nightly fireworks display. It traveled the full length of Disneyland from It's a Small World to Town Square at the beginning of Main Street, U.S.A. and at Magic Kingdom from Liberty Square to Town Square at the beginning of Main Street, U.S.A.

The various parade float height design created a problem because returning the parade units to the starting point required traveling behind the public areas, encountering over-pass bridges and tunnels. The taller units were rigged to telescope up after collapsing to pass under the low ceiling obstacles. Other units' stacked towers were hinged to drop or fold on top of the parade float.

== Soundtrack ==
The Sherman Brothers who had left Disney Studios to work for independent film companies were asked to write a special song for the American Bicentennial. The song was called "The Glorious Fourth" and was performed as a part of AOP.

The parade also featured synchronized music to which performers danced set routines created by Disneyland choreographers (Barnett Ricci and Marilyn Magness). Each of the parade performers sported costumes appropriate to the float around which they danced, as well as enormous heads fixed on a custom-built apparatus for support, with the performer looking through the neck, giving the parade a carnival appearance.

The parade's soundtrack was Don Dorsey's first project for Disney. He used synthesizers and antique carousel organs to create the soundtrack. During the parade's run, Dorsey conceptualized a system which Disney would develop a computer-controlled system called "Mickey Track" that controls the parade's music from 1980 and on. This system was later installed at Tokyo Disneyland in 1983, Disneyland Paris in 1992, and Hong Kong Disneyland in 2005.

== TV special ==
In 1976, a TV special "Walt Disney's America on Parade" aired, showing the parade and presented by Red Skelton.

== Floats ==
On less busy days in 1975 and 1976, some non-holiday units were cut. The "School Days" is cut during months of summer and December.

1. Spirit of '76 - the starting float featured Mickey Mouse, Donald Duck, and Goofy standing on a drum, next to a heavily themed eagle float, with Mickey holding a variant of the Stars and Stripes as the three friends all opened the parade. Donald played the flute, and Goofy played a hand-made drum.
2. Columbus's Ship - in 1492, before the creation of America, Italian explorer Christopher Columbus travelled the then-unknown seas, seeing what kind of discoveries he has managed to find and bring him into the new worlds. This float resembled a pirate ship.
3. The First Thanksgiving - in 1621, the Pilgrims created what would become Thanksgiving. This float was represented by a giant turkey puppet.
  1. This unit is shown after the Columbus's Ship and Ben Franklin for the month of November only.
4. Salem Witch Trials - in 1692, more than two hundred people were accused of witchcraft in colonial Massachusetts. This float featured two costumed characters about to be executed with another preparing the execution.
  1. This unit is shown after Columbus's Ship and Benjamin Franklin for the month of October only.
5. Benjamin Franklin - in 1752, Benjamin Franklin flew a kite during a thunderstorm and discovered the power of electricity. This float featured Benjamin Franklin flying a kite without lightning.
6. Dunking Stall
7. Square Dancing
8. Giant Bell
9. Giant Cannons
10. Betsy Ross - in June 1776, Betsy Ross raised the flag of what would be the United States in Philadelphia at the request of George Washington.
11. Rowing Boat
12. Riverboat
13. Stagecoach
14. Discovery of Gold
15. Voting Rights
16. Sunday Band Concert
17. School Days
  1. cut in December and summer months.
18. Transportation
19. Sports
20. Sunday Picnic
21. Modern Tech
22. Disney - in honor of the 20th anniversary of Disneyland, a special unit was made. After the 20th ended in 1976, it was moved to the Magic Kingdom for its fifth anniversary.
  1. Snow White and the Seven Dwarfs
  2. Television
  3. The Movie Industry
23. Circus Comes to Town
24. Hot Air Balloons
25. Statue of Liberty and the Golden Eagle

== Accidents ==
In 1976, an unidentified woman sued the Disney Parks Corporation because she claimed that one of the Three Little Pigs at the It's a Small World end of the parade route grabbed and fondled her during this parade. She claimed to have gained 50 pounds (23 kg) as a result of the incident and sued Disney for $150,000 in damages for assault and battery, false imprisonment, and humiliation. The plaintiff dropped charges after Disney's lawyers presented her with a photo of the costume, which had only inoperable stub arms, a common feature among the shorter characters that was eliminated in later years.

== See also ==
- Magic Kingdom attraction and entertainment history
- Disney's Fantillusion (the 2nd longest parade after AOP and the official successor of SpectroMagic)
- List of incidents at Disneyland Resort
