= Underground Railroad Bicycle Route =

Bicycle touring route from Mobile, Alabama, to Owen Sound, Ontario

The Underground Railroad Bicycle Route is a 2,000-mile bicycle touring route from Mobile, Alabama, to Owen Sound, Ontario. It was developed by Adventure Cycling Association with the Center for Minority Health (now called the Center for Health Equity) at the University of Pittsburgh. The route was built to loosely follow the Underground Railroad, the network of paths that African American slaves used to escape to the Northern United States and Canada.

== Route ==
The route begins on the shores of the Gulf Coast of the United States in Mobile, Alabama, where the last slave ship to bring slaves to the United States docked in 1860. Cyclists then follow the Drinking Gourd north, with stops to visit historic Underground Railroad sites like museums and safe houses. Since its development in 2007, the original route has been augmented by spurs to Pittsburgh, Pennsylvania and Cincinnati, Ohio, and an alternate route through Detroit, Michigan. The endpoint is Owen Sound, Ontario, "the Underground Railroad's most northerly safe haven."

== Terrain ==
The route varies from flat farmlands and rolling hills in Alabama and Mississippi to steep climbs and descents in Tennessee, Kentucky, and Indiana. The route is mostly rural aside from the spurs into Pittsburgh and Cincinnati, and the alternate route through Detroit.

== Areas visited ==
- Alabama
- Mississippi
- Tennessee
- Kentucky
- Indiana
- Ohio
- Pennsylvania
- New York
- Michigan
- Ontario

== Historic sites ==
- John Rankin House
- John P. Parker House
- Ulysses S. Grant childhood home
- Whitehall Plantation Museum
- National Underground Railroad Freedom Center
- Slave Market in Mobile
- Africatown in Mobile
- Harriet Beecher Stowe House
- Oberlin Heritage Center
- Lenawee County Historical Museum
- Charles H. Wright Museum of African American History
- Historic First Congregational Church
- Gateway to Freedom Monument
- Tower of Freedom Underground Railroad Monument
- Buxton National Historic Site and Museum
- First Baptist Church Chatham
- Chatham-Kent Black Historical Society
- Uncle Tom's Cabin Historical Site/Josiah Henson House
- Wilberforce Settlement Plaque
- Grey Roots Museum and Archives
- BME Church
- Historic Second Baptist Church
- Elmwood Cemetery
- Carnegie Center for Art & History
- Farmington Historic House Museum
- Springboro Historic District including conductor homes of the Underground Railroad.
