= June Curry =

June Curry (February 8, 1921 - July 16, 2012), also known as “The Cookie Lady”, lived in Afton, Virginia, alongside the TransAmerica Trail, a cross-country bicycle route mapped by Adventure Cycling Association in 1976. For more than 35 years, Curry offered food, lodging, water and showers to cyclists passing through her town.

Curry – who was born in Afton and lived her entire life in the same house – came unexpectedly to her role as benefactor. Afton is at the top of a steep ascent, and during the inaugural Bikecentennial ride in 1976, she and her father encountered many tired cyclists in search of food and other provisions. In Curry's words, “I decided it was easier to feed them than to put them up!” Early on, Curry provided home-baked cookies to her visitors, which earned for her her nickname, “The Cookie Lady”.

Curry owned another residence close to her own house, which eventually she set aside for the use of cyclists. The building, which became known variously as “The Bike House”, “The Bike Museum” or “The Cookie House”, accumulated an impressive collection of photographs, scrapbooks and other mementos of and from cyclists who had passed through. Curry was also the subject of an episode of Charles Kuralt's "On the Road" segment of CBS Sunday Morning. It has been estimated that more than 14,000 cyclists visited with Curry over the years.

In 2005, Curry suffered a stroke and, thanks to donations from cyclists and cycling organizations who had learned of her misfortune, was able to hire a caregiver.

In recognition of Curry's years of generosity, Adventure Cycling Association in 2003 established the June Curry Trail Angel Award to honor “a generous individual or group encountered during a bicycle tour that makes the cyclotourist’s journey easier or possible by helping the cyclist through an act of goodwill.” Curry was the award's first recipient.
