= Hemistour =

Old bicycle

Hemistour was a bicycle tour from Anchorage, Alaska, to Tierra del Fuego, Argentina, completed in part by Dan and Lys Burden and in full by Greg and June Siple from 1972 to 1975. Twenty-nine other cyclists joined the Burdens and Siples for parts of the trip, which totaled 18,272 miles (29,405.9 km).

National Geographic published an article about Hemistour, written and photographed by Dan Burden, in their May 1973 issue.

== Origin ==
Dan Burden began the Hemistour in 1966 as a way to promote hosteling and bicycling. His friend Greg Siple joined the project two years later. Burden and Siple had met through their chapter of American Youth Hostels in Columbus, Ohio, where they had also met their future wives, Lys and June, respectively, who also joined the Hemistour expedition.

== Hemistour ==
The Burdens and Siples, the core group of Hemistour, along with then-30-year-old librarian John Likins, set out from Anchorage, Alaska, on June 16, 1972. The intended route would make the riders the first to bicycle the length of the Western Hemisphere from north to south. They split the route into three parts: the first from Anchorage to Missoula, Montana, where the two couples were living at the time; the second from Missoula, Montana, to Oaxaca, Mexico; and the third from Oaxaca to Ushuaia in Tierra del Fuego province, Argentina — the southern tip of South America.

The route was designed to keep the two couples off of major highways, which meant that services would be few and far between. To keep the group supplied, they had mailed packages of food to themselves at various points along the route. They mostly camped just off the road or stayed in youth hostels.

In Missoula, the couples paused the trip for the winter to work and raise funds. Once reconvened, the group continued the bicycle tour to the West Coast and south into Mexico. It was in Chocolate, during a side trip in Baja California, that the group first discussed the idea of a mass bicycle ride across the United States to celebrate the bicentennial in 1976. June Siple later coined the name Bikecentennial.

In Oaxaca, Mexico, near the border with Guatemala, the Hemistour group again went on hiatus. This time, Greg Siple and the Burdens flew to Washington, D.C., to negotiate another article with National Geographic — which was never produced — while June attended a language school in Guatemala to learn Spanish. Dan Burden became ill with hepatitis while home in the U.S., forcing the Burdens to abandon Hemistour and instead focus on bringing Bikecentennial to fruition.

The Siples, however, continued on, arriving in Ushuaia, Tierra del Fuego, Argentina, on February 25, 1975.

== Areas visited ==
North America

- Alaska, U.S.
- Yukon, Canada
- British Columbia, Canada
- Montana, U.S.
- Oregon, U.S.
- California, U.S.
- Mexico

Central America

- Guatemala
- El Salvador
- Honduras
- Nicaragua
- Costa Rica
- Panama

South America

- Colombia
- Ecuador
- Peru
- Bolivia
- Argentina

== Post-Hemistour ==
After reaching the southern tip of the Western Hemisphere, Greg and June Siple returned to Missoula to join the Burdens in preparing for Bikecentennial.

== See also ==
- Adventure Cycling Association
