= The Glorious Fourth =

"The Glorious Fourth" is a song written by Richard M. Sherman and Robert B. Sherman in 1974 for the then-upcoming American Bicentennial. Disneyland temporarily changed its "Main Street Electrical Parade" to "America on Parade" and featured the Sherman Brothers' song "The Glorious Fourth". The revamped parade featured nightly fireworks and ran twice a day from 1975-1977.

== Making history with the Sherman Brothers ==
The writing of this song marked a brief, albeit non-exclusive, return of the brother songwriting duo to the Disney fold where they had left exclusive employment in 1968. The Shermans worked exclusively for Walt Disney from 1960 until his death in 1966. Becoming disenchanted with the studio, the brother team left in 1968 working on a myriad of film and stage projects for various producers and studios. They returned briefly to finish work on The Aristocats and Bedknobs and Broomsticks for which they received two Academy Award nominations (for the latter film).

1974 also marked the return of the Shermans to Disney to write "The Best Time Of Your Life" which was a replacement song for the General Electric pavilion's "There's A Great Big Beautiful Tomorrow" featured in Carousel of Progress at Disneyland and Walt Disney World. In 1974 the Shermans additionally enjoyed the release of Winnie the Pooh and Tigger Too!, the third Winnie the Pooh featurette to feature their songs.

Outside of Disney, the Shermans also saw the release of Huckleberry Finn (MGM/UA) for which they authored both the songs and the screenplay as well as a hit Broadway musical, Over Here! starring the Andrews Sisters and John Travolta. The Shermans' song "You're Sixteen" (sung by former Beatle, Ringo Starr) reached #1 on Billboard's Hot 100 list all in that same historic year.
