= Idaho Hot Springs Mountain Bike Route =

The Idaho Hot Springs Mountain Bike Route is an off-road bicycle touring route in central Idaho. Developed by Adventure Cycling Association, the route consists of 518 miles of mostly dirt roads and 227 miles of optional singletrack, with access to more than 50 hot springs.

== Route ==
The main route is a loop through the towns of Featherville, Ketchum, Stanley, McCall, Cascade, Crouch, and Idaho City, with an optional spur to Boise. The main route is bidirectional, but the singletrack routes are only mapped counterclockwise.

== Terrain ==
Notable highlights on the route include the Sawtooth Mountains, the White Cloud Mountains, the Boise Mountains, the Salmon River, and the Sawtooth, Salmon-Challis, Boise, and Payette National Forests. The route also takes the riders near several wilderness areas, including the Hemingway-Boulder, the Sawtooth, the Frank Church River of No Return, and the Cecil D. Andrus–White Clouds Wilderness, which effectively bars cyclists from the White Cloud singletrack option.

== Riding the Idaho Hot Springs Mountain Bike Route ==
Most people ride the route counterclockwise with typical times to complete it ranging from 2 to 3 weeks. Due to the mountainous terrain and the unpredictable central Idaho weather, the riding season generally runs from May after the roads are free of snow to October when the snow flies again. Early season high water from snow runoff may affect accessibility of the hot springs located adjacent to the rivers.

Consideration should be given to Idaho’s fire season in August and September. The US Forest Service website provides daily updates on current fire conditions and links to the National Weather Service for critical decision making information especially wind speed and direction. Depending on the time of year, temperatures may range to freezing at night to over 90 degrees F during the heat of the day.

While grizzly bears are uncommon in this region, black bears are known to inhabit the area. Standard safety measures, such as maintaining a clean campsite and properly storing food, are recommended for all visitors.

Water is generally very accessible on this route and a water filter is recommended.

The Adventure Cycling Association maps for this route are comprehensive, though standard navigation skills and judgment are required. As commercial lodging is limited, riders should be self-sufficient and equipped for camping. Proficiency in basic bicycle maintenance is also recommended.

== Hot Springs ==
Riders on the Idaho Hot Springs Mountain Bike Route can access the following developed hot springs as well as many natural, undeveloped hot springs:

- Baumgartner Hot Springs
- Easley Hot Springs
- Burgdorf Hot Springs
- Gold Fork Hot Springs
- Silver Creek Plunge Hot Springs
- Terrace Lakes Hot Springs
