= Bikecentennial =

1976 bicycle tour and route across America

Banner advertising Bikecentennial in 1976

Bikecentennial '76 was an event consisting of a series of bicycle tours on the TransAmerica Bicycle Trail across the United States in the summer of 1976 in commemoration of the bicentennial of America's Declaration of Independence. The route crossed ten states, 22 national forests, two national parks, and 112 counties between Astoria, Oregon, and Yorktown, Virginia, a distance of about 4,250 miles (6,840 km). The route was chosen to take cyclists through small towns on mostly rural, low-traffic roads.

4,065 riders participated in the event, representing all 50 states and many foreign countries. Several route options were available to the participants, ranging from an 82-day, 4,212-mile cross-country trip to a more modest 12-day trip through the Rocky Mountains. 1,784 cyclists were signed up to ride the entire length of the trail. Most of the participants rode in prearranged groups of 10 to 12 with a group leader, while about a quarter rode solo. The riders were essentially self-contained; they carried camping gear, food, and other necessities in panniers on their bicycles.

Bikecentennial had been a 501(c)(3) nonprofit since 1974, and after the 1976 event the organization lived on to serve the needs of traveling cyclists, developing more routes and making maps. Bikecentennial changed its name in 1993 to Adventure Cycling Association.

== Origin ==
A 1976 bicycle tour across the United States was conceived by Greg Siple in 1973 while he, his wife June, and Dan and Lys Burden were riding an 18,000-mile bicycle tour, called Hemistour, from Anchorage, Alaska, to Tierra del Fuego, Argentina, to promote bicycling and hosteling. June Siple coined the name Bikecentennial a few months later as Hemistour progressed through Mexico. Siple had founded an annual bicycle tour called the Tour of the Scioto River Valley (TOSRV) in Ohio with his father in 1962.

During a break from Hemistour, Dan Burden became severely ill and had to drop out. He and his wife, Lys, focused on building the Bikecentennial event while the Siples continued their tour of the Western Hemisphere.

== Route ==
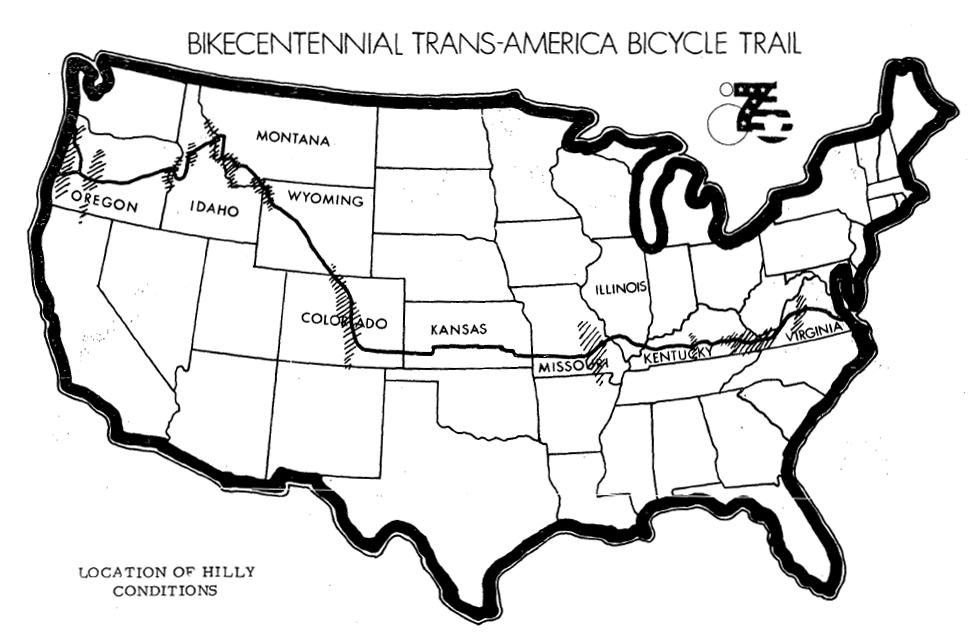
Bikecentennial Route

Bikecentennial's route, called the TransAmerica Bicycle Trail, was developed by Lys Burden with the help of Bikecentennial staff and volunteers. The route was chosen to satisfy several requirements, such as a road surface suitable for bicycles, minimal traffic, varied terrain, historic and interesting landmarks, and access to basic services like campgrounds and grocery stores. The Bikecentennial TransAmerica Trail should not be confused with the similarly named Trans America Trail (TAT), a mostly off-pavement, 5273-mile (8486-km) motorcycle route between the Outer Banks of North Carolina and Port Orford, Oregon, that has become popular with mountain bike riders.

State	Cities and Landmarks	Summits
Virginia	Yorktown, Williamsburg, Richmond suburbs, Charlottesville (4th largest city), Lexington, Roanoke suburbs, Christiansburg, Radford, Wytheville, Appalachian Trail, Damascus, Breaks Interstate Park	Blue Ridge Parkway, Appalachian ridges
Kentucky	Elkhorn City, Hazard, Berea, Bardstown, Lincoln's birthplace, Rough River Dam SP, Sebree, Marion, Ohio River	Appalachian and Cumberland Plateau ridges
Illinois	Cave in Rock SP, Carbondale, Chester, Popeye statue, Mississippi River	
Missouri	Farmington, Johnson's Shut-Ins SP, Ozark NSR, Eminence, Marshfield	Ozark Plateau ridges
Kansas	Pittsburg, Eureka, Newton, Hutchinson suburbs, Quivira NWR, Larned, Ness City, Tribune	
Colorado	Eads, Pueblo (~midpoint & 2nd largest city), Cañon City, Royal Gorge, South Park, Breckenridge, Kremmling, Walden, North Park	Hoosier Pass (highest pt, 11,541 feet (3,518 m)), Willow Creek Pass
Wyoming	Saratoga, Rawlins, Great Divide Basin, Lander, Wind River Reservation, Grave of Sacagawea, Grand Teton NP, Yellowstone NP	Muddy Gap, Togwotee Pass, Craig Pass
Montana	West Yellowstone, Quake Lake, Virginia City, Dillon, Big Hole National Battlefield, Hamilton, Missoula (Bikecentennial HQ and 3rd largest city)	Badger Pass, Big Hole Pass, Chief Joseph Pass, Lost Trail Pass, Lolo Pass
Idaho	Lochsa River, Nez Perce Reservation and NHP, Grangeville, Council, Brownlee Dam, Hells Canyon	White Bird Hill Summit
Oregon	Baker City, John Day, Prineville, Eugene (largest city), Reedsport, or Corvallis, Dallas, Otis, Astoria	Flagstaff Hill, Tipton Summit, Dixie Pass, Ochoco Summit, McKenzie Pass

The route crosses the Continental Divide nine times in Colorado, Wyoming, and Montana.

== Ride ==
The TransAmerica Bicycle Trail was inaugurated on May 14, 1976. The TransAm groups, those riding coast to coast, set off from trailheads at either Astoria, OR, or Yorktown, VA, while other groups riding shorter tours set off from trailheads inland. The prearranged groups consisted of about 10 to 12 riders including a leader, trained by Bikecentennial staff, who would handle the group's money and delegate chores like buying food, cooking, and cleaning up the campsite.

== Support ==
Bikecentennial received support from the Wally Byam Foundation, Huffy bikes, Shimano, the Bicycle Institute of America, and the American Revolution Bicentennial Administration.

== Legacy ==
Route sign in Fairplay, CO, in 2006

The success of the 1976 event led Adventure Cycling to map several additional bicycle routes across the United States and Canada. The Adventure Cycling Route Network now consists of over 52,000 miles and is the largest bicycle route network in North America.

Since 2014, the annual Trans Am Bike Race has used basically the same route as that used for the Bikecentennial.

== Further reading and external links ==
- Stephanie Ager Kirz, Bicycling the TransAm Trail: Virginia to Oregon/Washington, 2nd Edition, White Dog Press Ltd., 2003, ISBN 978-0-9741027-1-9.
- Jay Martin Anderson, Two Wheels to America, J.M. Anderson/iTunes, 2012. Author Anderson led a Bikecentennial group of 12 cyclists west to east.
- Dan D'Ambrosio, "Bikecentennial: Summer of 1976," Adventure Cycling Association, 2019.
- Derek L. Jensen, Mad Dogs and an Englishman, Pivo Publishing Corp., 2007, ISBN 1-4120-9415-1. Author Jensen was one of the ~2000 (and 10% foreigners) who rode the entire Bikecentennial Trail in 1976. MD&E includes a detailed account of the event from west to east.
- Ruthie Knox, Ride With Me, Loveswept, 2012, ASIN B0061C1OQ0. A romance novel of bicycle touring on the TransAmerica Bicycle Trail.
- Michael McCoy & Greg Siple, America's Bicycle Route: The Story of the Transamerica Bicycle Trail, The Donning Company Publishers, 2016, ISBN 978-1-68184-030-7.

== See also ==
- June Curry
- U.S. Bicycle Route 76
