= Ochoco Summit =

Mountain pass in Oregon, United States

Coordinates: 44°30′05″N 120°23′12″W

Ochoco Pass
- Interactive map of Ochoco Pass
- Elevation: 4,731 ft (1,442 m)
- Traversed by: US 26

Third Approach
- Location: Crook / Wheeler counties, Oregon, United States

Ochoco Summit (el. 4720 ft.) is a mountain pass in Oregon traversed by Oregon Route 26. In 2011, The Forest Service for the U.S. Department of Agriculture announced its project to add more trails to Ochoco Summit.
