= United States Bicentennial =

200th anniversary of US independence

- Date: July 4, 1976; 50 years ago
- Location: United States
- Previous event: Sesquicentennial (1926)
- Next event: Semiquincentennial (2026)
- Major events: 200th anniversary of the adoption of the Declaration of Independence
- President: Gerald Ford
- Organizer: American Revolution Bicentennial Commission (1966–1973); American Revolution Bicentennial Administration (1973–1976)

The United States Bicentennial was a series of celebrations and observances held during the mid-1970s to commemorate the 200th anniversary of the Declaration of Independence. It was a major commemoration of the American Revolution. Official Bicentennial events began in April 1975 and culminated on July 4, 1976, the 200th anniversary of the Declaration's adoption by the Second Continental Congress.

Planning began in 1966, when the United States Congress established the American Revolution Bicentennial Commission. The Commission initially proposed a single exposition in either Philadelphia or Boston, but Congress later replaced it with the American Revolution Bicentennial Administration, which coordinated a decentralized national program of commemorations. Between March 1975 and December 1976, tens of thousands of events and projects were held in the United States and abroad. Major observances included the American Freedom Train, commemorations of the Battles of Lexington and Concord, Operation Sail, and thousands of locally sponsored events, including parades, historical reenactments, and fireworks displays.

The Bicentennial inspired numerous commemorative works, including television programs and films such as the Bicentennial Minutes, the Schoolhouse Rock! series "America Rock", and John Huston's short film Independence. It was also commemorated through redesigned coinage, postage stamps, exhibitions, sporting events, and commercial products. Other major Bicentennial observances included the Festival of American Folklife, the opening of the new National Air and Space Museum building, international participation in Operation Sail, state visits, and gifts from foreign governments. Its official symbol was a widely used red, white, and blue star logo designed by Bruce Blackburn.

== Background ==
The United States has historically commemorated the founding as a gesture of patriotism and, at times, as an argument in political battles. Historian Jonathan Crider points out that in the 1850s, editors and orators, from both Northern and Southern states, claimed their region was the true custodian of the legacy of 1776, as they used the Revolution symbolically in their rhetoric.

The plans for the Bicentennial began when Congress created the American Revolution Bicentennial Commission on July 4, 1966. Initially, the Bicentennial celebration was planned as a single city exposition (titled Expo '76) that would be staged in either Philadelphia or Boston. After 6½ years of tumultuous debate, the Commission recommended that there should not be a single event. Congress dissolved it on December 11, 1973, and created the American Revolution Bicentennial Administration (ARBA), which it charged with encouraging and coordinating locally sponsored events. This change appealed to both conservatives and American left; as for conservatives, it gave them local control over events, and for those on the left, it promoted a more inclusive celebration.

David Ryan, a professor at University College Cork, notes that the Bicentennial was celebrated only a year after the Fall of Saigon in 1975 and that the Ford administration stressed the themes of renewal and rebirth based on a restoration of traditional values, giving a nostalgic and exclusive reading of the American past.

== Logo ==
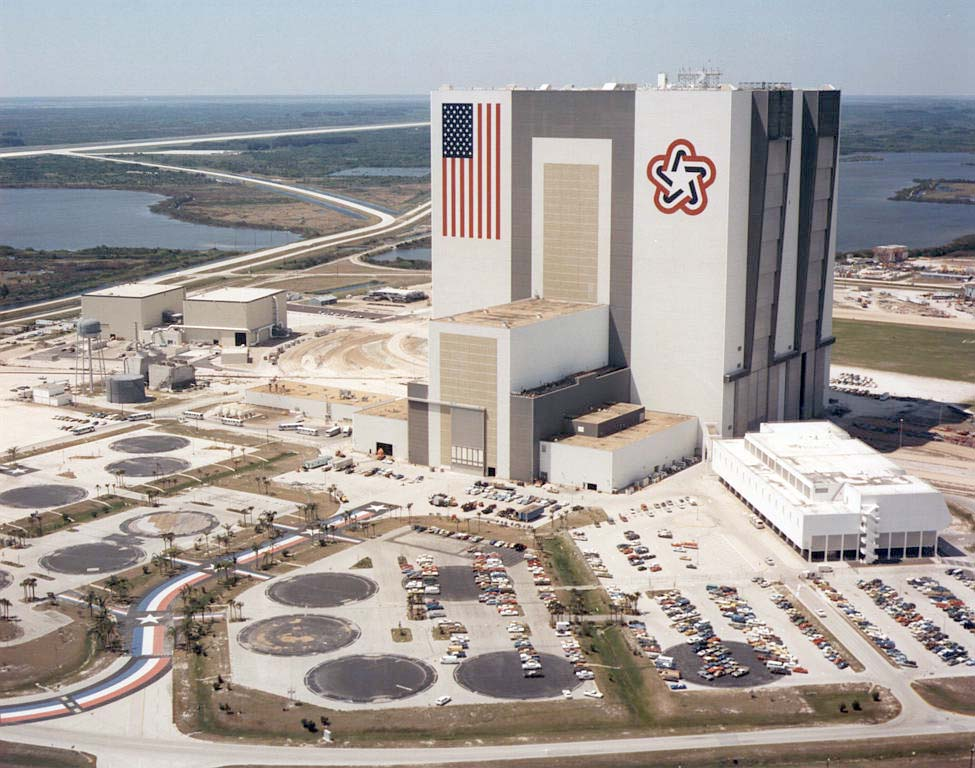
NASA's Vehicle Assembly Building in 1977

Bruce N. Blackburn, co-designer of the modernized NASA insignia, designed the logo. The logo consisted of a white five-point star inside a stylized star of red, white and blue. It was encircled by the inscription American Revolution Bicentennial 1776–1976 in Helvetica Regular. An early use of the logo was on a 1971 US postage stamp. The logo became a flag that flew at many government facilities throughout the United States and appeared on many other souvenirs and postage stamps issued by the Postal Service. NASA painted the logo on the Vehicle Assembly Building at the Kennedy Space Center in 1976 where it remained until 1998 when the agency replaced it with its own emblem as part of its 40th anniversary celebrations.

== 1973 events ==
=== Boston Oil Party ===
In 1973, on the shores of Boston Harbor, activists and history enthusiasts recreated the Boston Tea Party. Participants and spectators boasted signs and effigies in an effort to promote "environmental protection, racial justice, an end to corporate profiteering, and the impeachment of Richard Nixon." Several people threw packages and oil barrels labeled "Gulf Oil" and "Exxon" into Boston Harbor in symbolic opposition to corporate power, in the style of the Boston Tea Party. This reenactment later was termed as the "Boston Oil Party", and roughly 10,000 people witnessed the dumping of oil conglomerates, as well as the hanging of an effigy of President Nixon.

== 1975 events ==
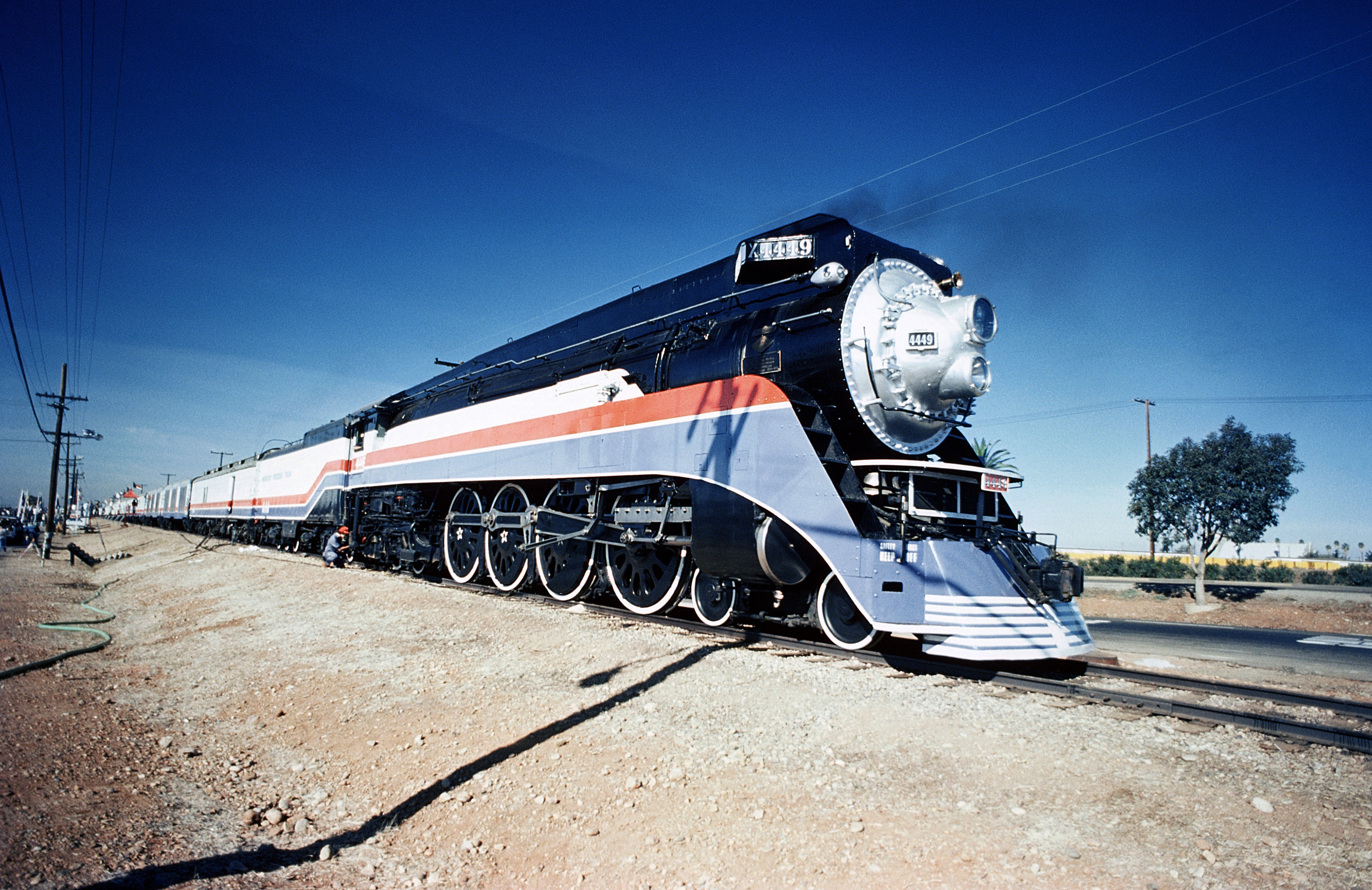
The American Freedom Train stopping at the Naval Air Station in Miramar, California on January 15, 1976

The official Bicentennial events began April 1, 1975, when the American Freedom Train launched in Wilmington, Delaware to start its 21-month, 25,388-mile (40,858 km) tour of the 48 contiguous states.

On April 18, 1975, President Gerald Ford traveled to Boston to light a third lantern at the historic Old North Church, symbolizing America's third century. The following day, April 19, he delivered a major address in Concord, Massachusetts at the Old North Bridge where the "shot heard round the world" was fired, commemorating the 200th anniversary of the Battles of Lexington and Concord which began the military aspect of the American Revolution. According to the New York Times "more than 2,000 spectators were on hand" as cannons were fired and a Paul Revere reenactor rode through announcing the arrival of British regulars.

On December 31, 1975, the eve of the Bicentennial Year, Ford recorded a statement to address the American people by means of radio and television broadcasts. Presidential Proclamation 4411 was signed as an affirmation to the Founding Fathers of the United States principles of dignity, equality, government by representation, and liberty.

== 1976 events ==
1976 festivities included elaborate fireworks in the skies above major US cities. President Ford presided over the display in Washington, D.C., which was televised nationally. Celebrations in cities and towns across the nation opened into full effect including celebrations such as Operation Sail (Op Sail), a large international fleet parade of tall-masted sailing ships gathering first in New York City on Independence Day and then in Boston about one week later. Other large-scale events, such as reenactments, parades, and booms in commercialized commemoration, spread across the nation as the year went on.

=== New York ===
In addition to the presence of the 'tall ships', navies of many nations sent warships to New York Harbor for an International Naval Review held the morning of July 4. President Ford sailed down the Hudson River into New York Harbor aboard the guided missile cruiser USS Wainwright to review the international fleet and receive salutes from each visiting ship, ending with a salute from the Royal Navy guided-missile destroyer HMS London. The review ended just above Liberty Island at around 10:30 am.

=== Washington, D.C. ===
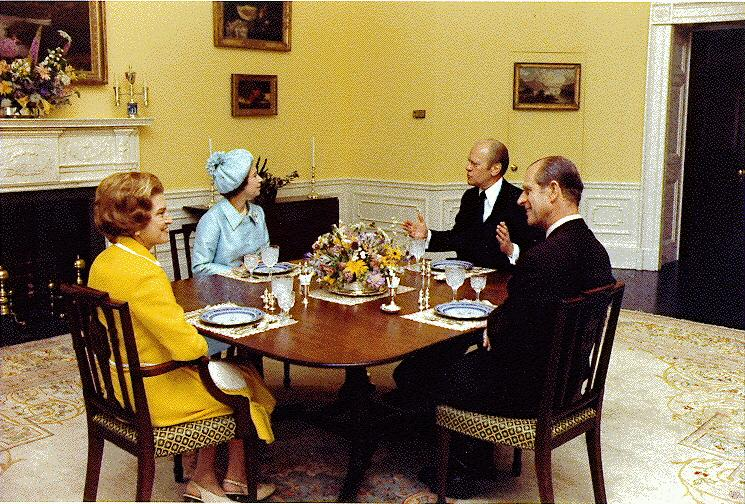
First Lady Betty Ford, with President Gerald Ford, Queen Elizabeth II, and Prince Philip in the President's Dining Room in conjunction with a 1976 state visit during the US Bicentennial

Johnny Cash served as the Grand Marshal of the US Bicentennial parade.

The event was attended by Queen Elizabeth II and Prince Philip. The royal couple made a state visit to the United States, toured the country, and attended other Bicentennial functions with President and Mrs. Ford. Their visit aboard the British royal yacht HMY Britannia included stops in Philadelphia, Washington, D.C., Virginia, New York, Connecticut, and Massachusetts.

The Smithsonian Institution opened a long-term exhibition in its Arts and Industries Building replicating the look and feel of the 1876 Centennial Exposition in Philadelphia, including artifacts from earlier exposition. The Bicentennial Festival of American Folklife, a collaboration of the Smithsonian with thousands of national and international scholars, folk artisans, and performers, hosted programs in the western part of the National Mall five days a week for twelve weeks in the summer of 1976. The Smithsonian also opened the new home of the National Air and Space Museum on July 1, 1976.

=== Government celebration ===
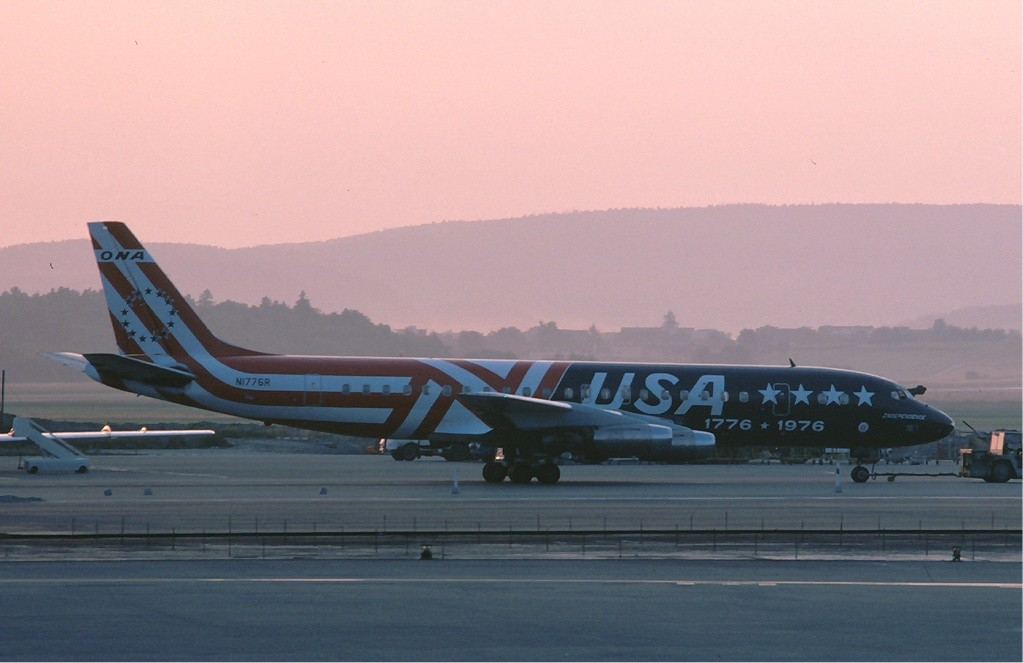
Douglas DC-8 of Overseas National Airways in US Bicentennial special livery

George Washington was posthumously appointed to the grade of General of the Armies of the United States by the congressional joint resolution Public Law 94-479 passed January 19, 1976, with an effective appointment date of July 4, 1976. This restored Washington's position as the highest-ranking military officer in US history. (Note: William Gardner Bell states that when Washington was recalled back into military service from his retirement in 1798, "Congress passed legislation that would have made him General of the Armies of the United States, but his services were not required in the field and the appointment was not made until the Bicentennial in 1976, when it was bestowed posthumously as a commemorative honor". The Army says that with Public Law 94-479, President Ford specified that Washington would "rank first among all officers of the Army, past and present. 'General of the Armies of the United States' is only associated with two people ... one being Washington and the other being John J. Pershing.")

NASA commemorated the Bicentennial by staging a science and technology exhibit housed in a series of geodesic domes in the parking lot of the Vehicle Assembly Building (VAB) called Third Century America. An American flag and the Bicentennial emblem were also painted on the side of the VAB; the emblem remained until 1998, when it was painted over with the NASA insignia. NASA planned for Viking 1 to land on Mars on July 4, but delayed the landing to July 20, the anniversary of the Apollo 11 lunar landing. On the anniversary of the signing of the Constitution, NASA held the rollout ceremony of the first Space Shuttle (which NASA had planned to name Constitution but was, instead, named "Enterprise" in honor of its fictional namesake on the television series Star Trek).

=== Delaware crossing reenactment ===
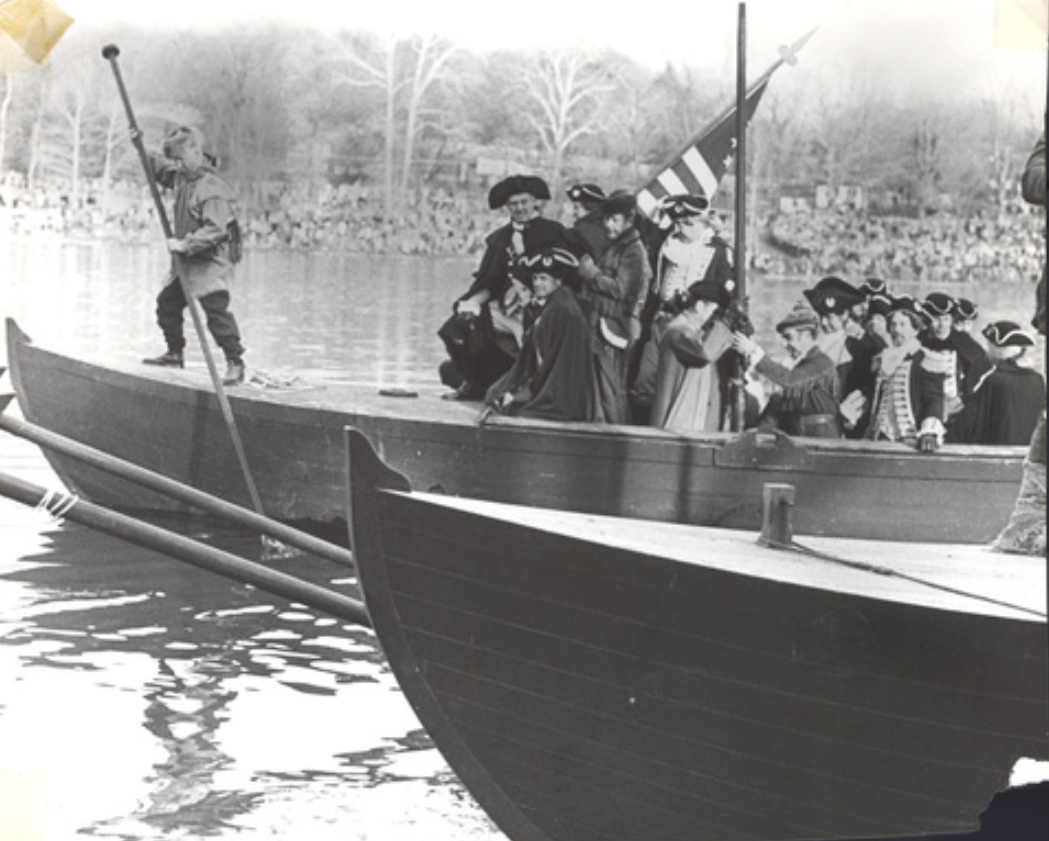
Reenactors command their vessel across the Delaware River to commemorate the Delaware Crossing, circa 1976

On November 20 and 21 of 1976, participants immersed themselves in the era by donning period-accurate uniforms and equipping themselves with the tools and weaponry characteristic of that Christmas night over two centuries prior. The reenactment unfolded as a grand spectacle, featuring a flotilla of boats navigating the icy currents of the Delaware River.

Since then, the Crossing the Delaware reenactment has occurred every year to relive and recognize this moment.

=== Philadelphia ===
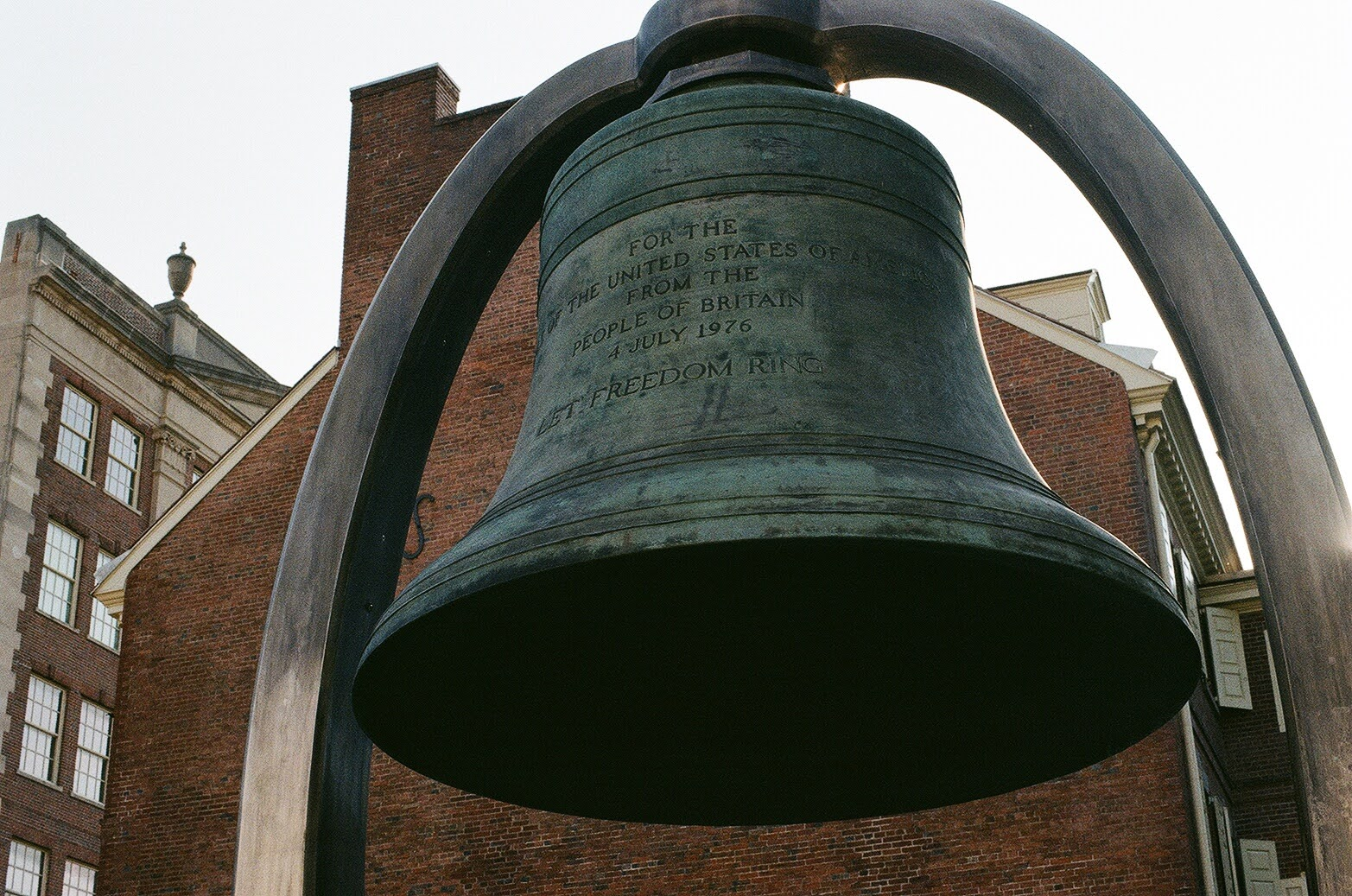
The Bicentennial Bell in Benjamin Rush Garden in Philadelphia (2025)

While in Philadelphia on July 6, 1976, Queen Elizabeth II presented the Bicentennial Bell on behalf of the British people. The bell is a replica of the Liberty Bell, cast at the same foundry—Whitechapel Bell Foundry—and bearing the inscription "For the People of the United States of America from the People of Britain 4 July 1976 LET FREEDOM RING."

=== Los Angeles ===
Disneyland and the Magic Kingdom at Walt Disney World presented America on Parade, an elaborate parade celebrating American history and culture, and featured the Sherman Brothers' song "The Glorious Fourth". The parade featured nightly fireworks and ran twice daily from June 1975 to September 1976.

Los Angeles observances included the Bicentennial Parade of 1976 on Wilshire Boulevard, and the Los Angeles City Schools Bicentennial Pageant at Los Angeles Memorial Coliseum, broadcast as part of Happy Birthday, America (NBC), hosted by Paul Anka, Pacific 21, a bicentennial exhibition and conference center, and Knott's Berry Farm bicentennial celebration.

=== Professional sports celebrations ===
The overall theme of the entertainment of Super Bowl X, held on January 18, was to celebrate the Bicentennial. Players on both teams, the Pittsburgh Steelers and the Dallas Cowboys, wore a special patch with the Bicentennial Logo on their jerseys; the Cowboys also added red, white, and blue striping to their helmets throughout the 1976 NFL season. The halftime show, featuring the performance group Up with People, was entitled "200 Years and Just a Baby: A Tribute to America's Bicentennial".

The United States Olympic Committee (USOC) initiated bids to host both the 1976 Summer and Winter Olympic Games to celebrate the Bicentennial. Los Angeles bid for the 1976 Summer Olympics but lost to Montreal. Denver was awarded the 1976 Winter Olympics in 1970. Still, concern over costs led Colorado voters to reject a referendum to fund the games, and the International Olympic Committee awarded the games to Innsbruck, Austria, the host of the 1964 games. As a result, there was no Olympics in the United States in 1976 despite a last minute offer from Salt Lake City to host. However, Lake Placid would host the 1980 Winter Olympics, Los Angeles would eventually host the 1984 Summer Olympics, and Salt Lake City would also eventually host the 2002 Winter Olympics.

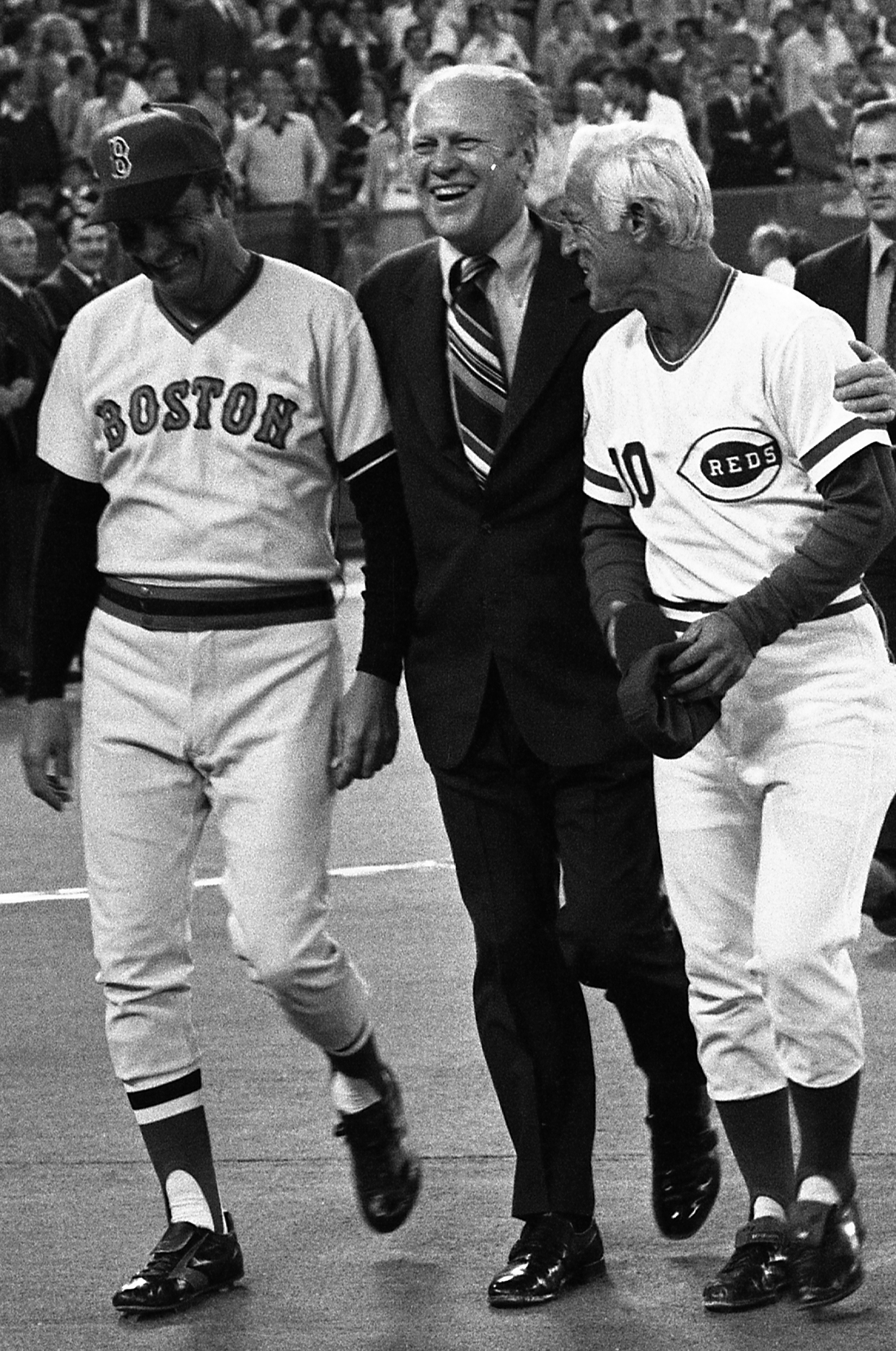
President Gerald Ford (center) with Darrell Johnson and Sparky Anderson during ceremonies at the 1976 Major League Baseball All-Star Game

As site of the Continental Congress and signing of the Declaration of Independence, Philadelphia served as host for the 1976 NBA All-Star Game, the 1976 National Hockey League All-Star Game, the 1976 NCAA Final Four, and the 1976 Major League Baseball All-Star Game at which President Ford threw out the first pitch. The 1976 Pro Bowl was an exception and was played in New Orleans, likely due to weather concerns.

=== Other ===
Local observances included painting mailboxes and fire hydrants red, white, and blue. A wave of patriotism and nostalgia swept the nation, and there was a general feeling that the era of the civil rights movement, the Vietnam War, and the Watergate constitutional crisis of 1974 had finally come to an end.

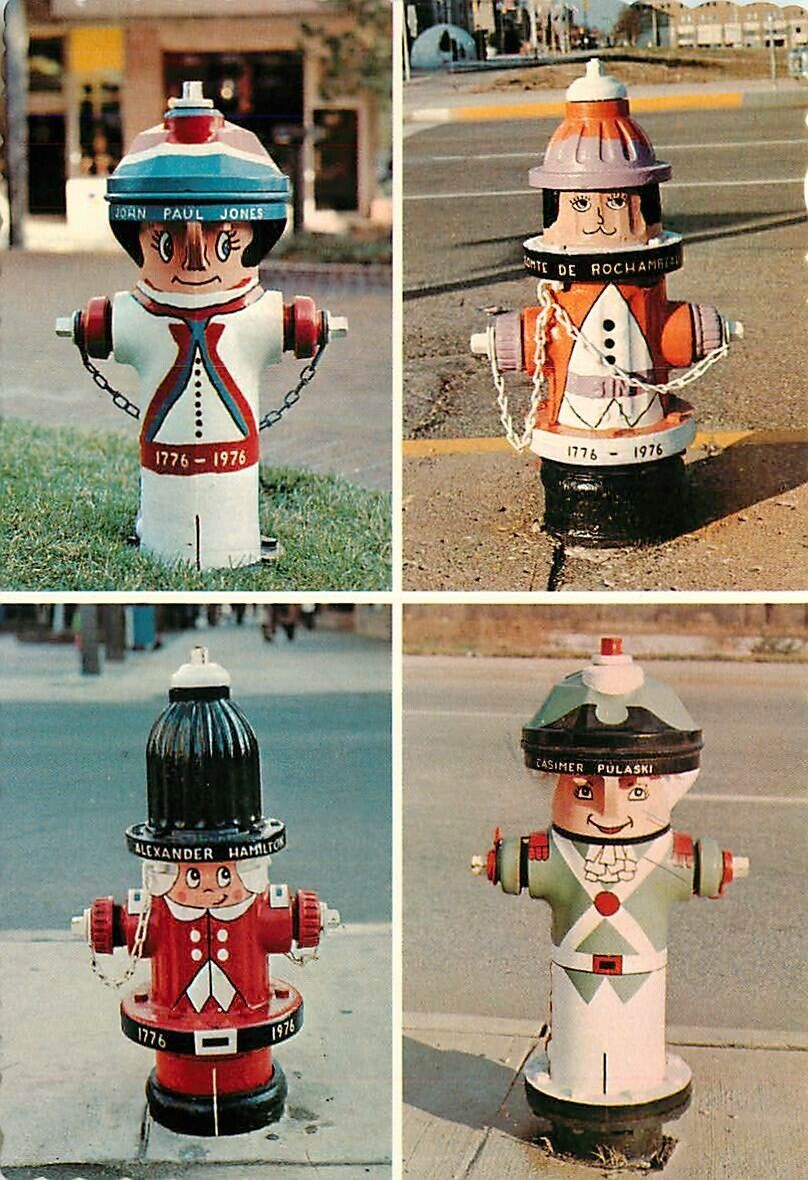
Examples of the painted fire hydrants from South Bend, Indiana, circa 1976

In the summer of 1976, the city of South Bend, Indiana, embarked on a unique project to commemorate the United States Bicentennial: painting its fire hydrants in vibrant colors and patriotic designs. Over four decades later, many of South Bend's painted fire hydrants still stand as reminders of America's Bicentennial celebration.

Bell Telephone Company commissioned Stanley Meltzoff to create a cover for its 1976 directory to commemorate both the Bicentennial and the centennial of the invention of the telephone. Based on Norman Rockwell's The Gossips, Meltzoff depicted America's great historic and iconic figures using the telephone. It became the biggest-selling directory in Bell's history.

Many national railroads and shortlines painted locomotives or rolling stock in patriotic color schemes, typically numbered 1776 or 1976, and model railroad manufacturers quickly released bicentennial locomotives, which were popular among children and adults. Many military units marked aircraft with special designs in honor of the Bicentennial. John Warner served as ARBA director.

The New Jersey Lottery operated a special "Bicentennial Lottery" in which the winner received $1,776 per week (before taxes) for 20 years (a total of $1,847,040).

The Bicentennial Wagon Train Pilgrimage began a journey from Blaine, Washington on June 8, 1975, concluding at Valley Forge, Pennsylvania on July 4, 1976. The wagon train pilgrimage traced the original covered wagon trade and transportation routes across the United States. The Conestoga wagon overland pilgrimage encompassed the Bozeman Trail, California Trail, Gila Trail, Great Wagon Road, Mormon Trail, Natchez Trace Trail, Old Post Road, Old Spanish Trail, Oregon Trail, Overland Trail, Santa Fe Trail, and Wilderness Road.

Karen Steele was the first baby born on July 4, 1976, 12 seconds after midnight, and was referred to as the "Bicentennial Baby". She was featured on The Today Show and Good Morning America, and received commemorations from President Ford, New Jersey Governor Brendan Byrne, and a host of other notables.

Many commercial products, including sports, apparel, and collectibles, appeared in red, white, and blue packages in an attempt to tie them to the Bicentennial. Liberty, a brand of Spanish olives, sold its product in glass jars that replicated the Liberty Bell at the time. Products were only permitted to display the trademarked Bicentennial logo by paying a license fee to ARBA.

== Ceremonial coinage ==
The US government also commemorated the Bicentennial by creating new designs for national currency. The creation of the ceremonial coinage was both a way to get the American public involved in celebrating the Bicentennial and to encourage Americans to collect and purchase more Bicentennial memorabilia.

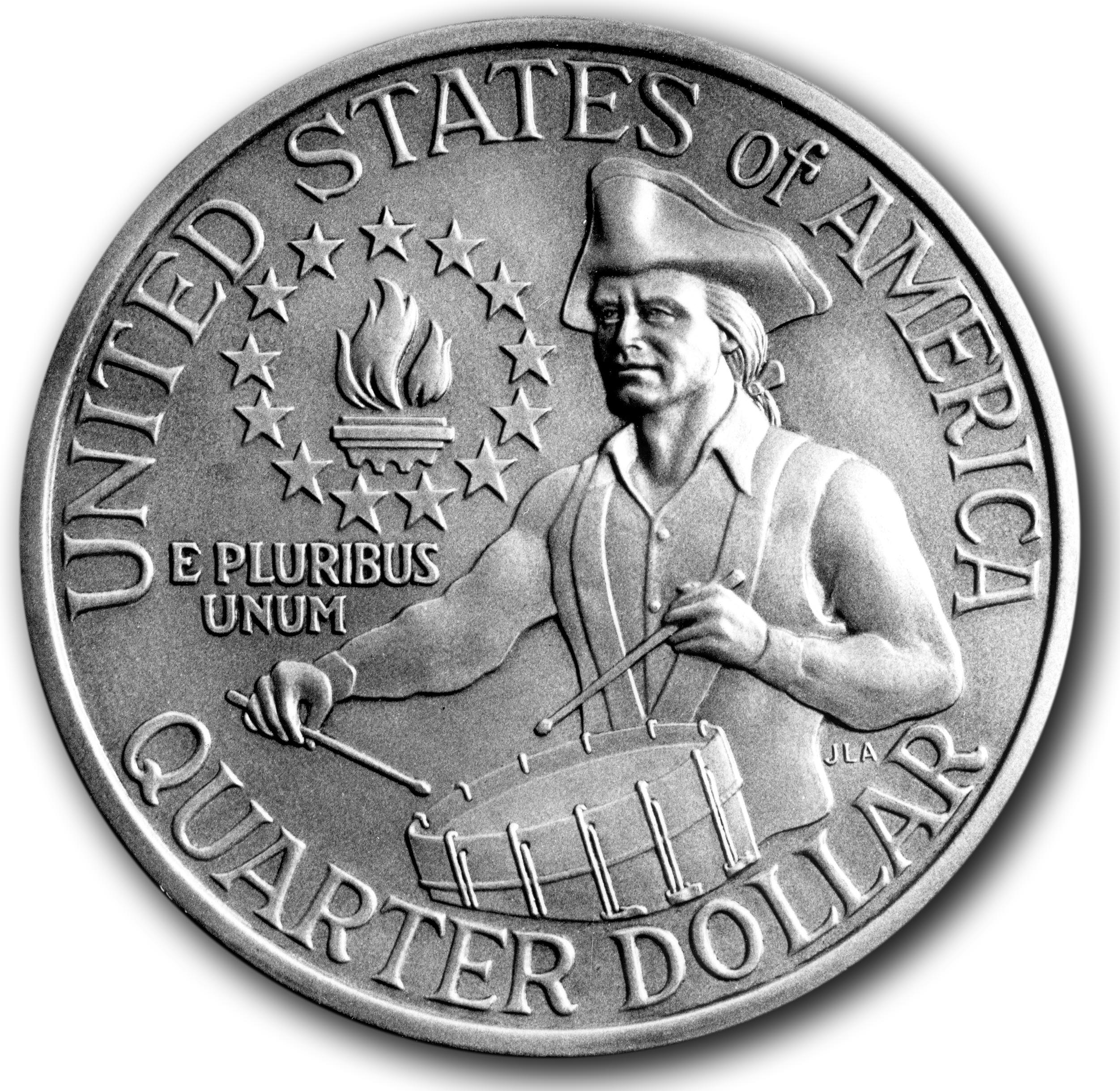
Reverse of the Bicentennial quarter, minted 1975–1976

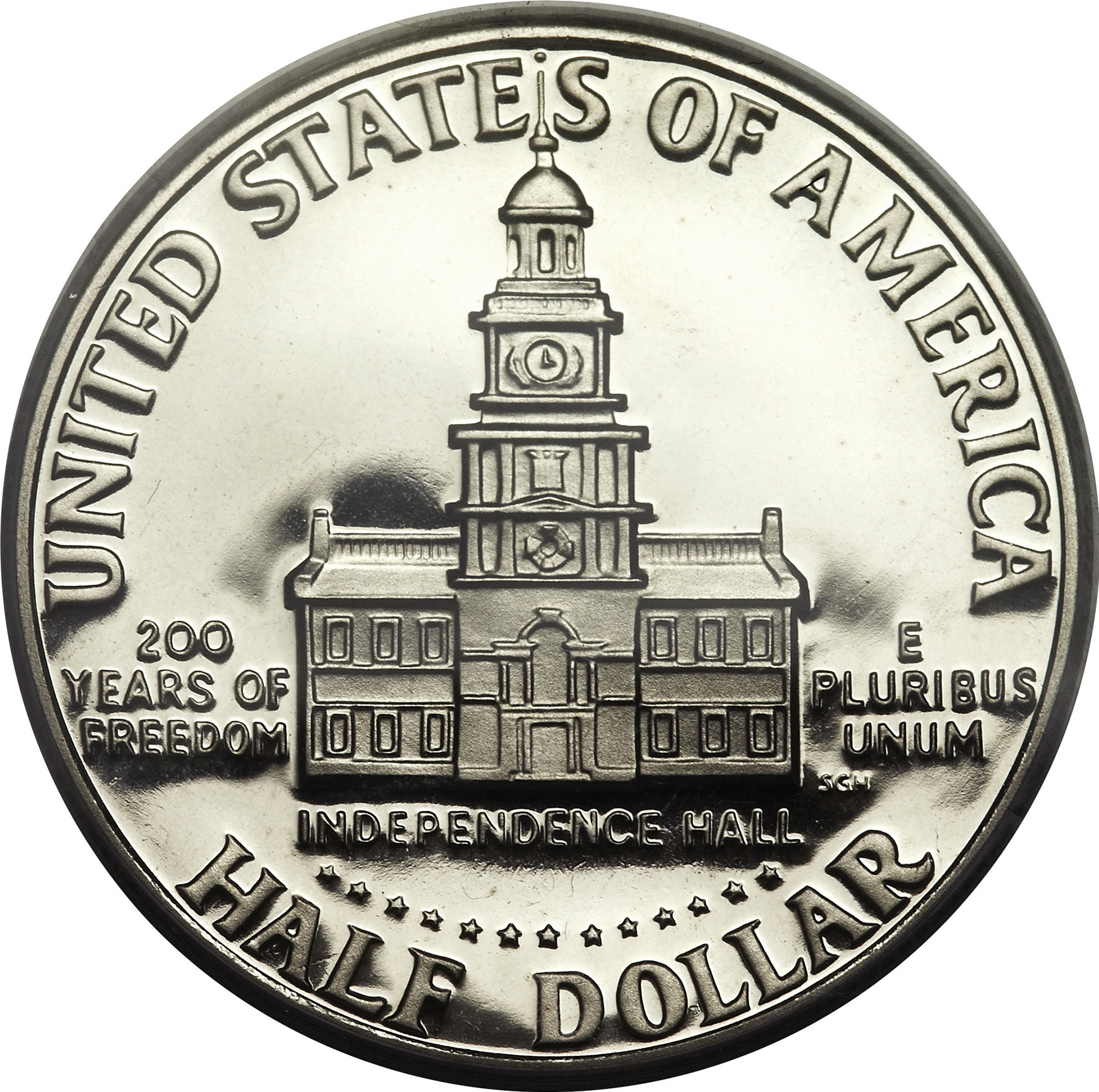
Reverse of the Bicentennial Kennedy half dollar, minted 1975–1976

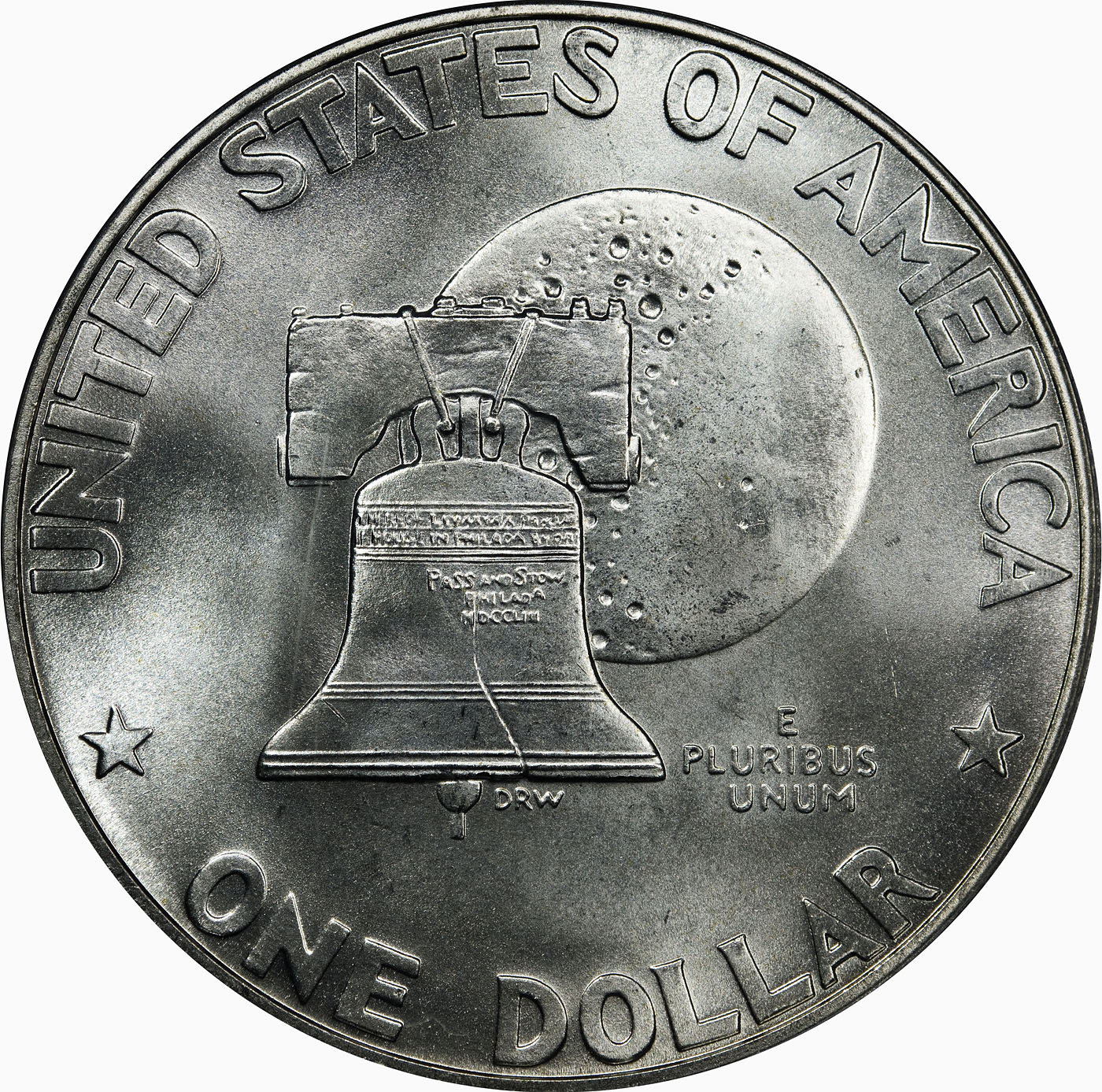
Reverse of the Bicentennial dollar (Type 1), minted 1975–1976

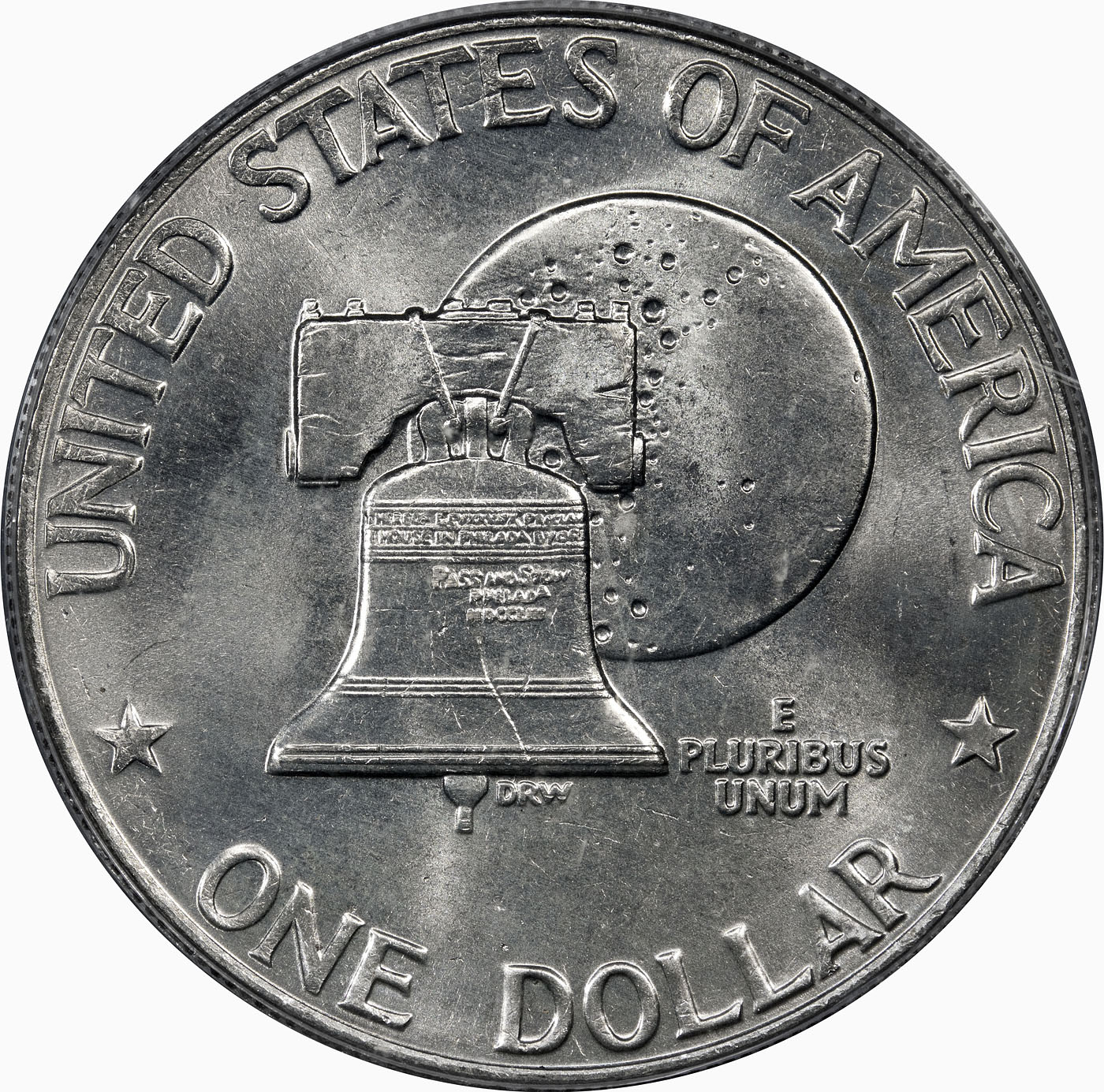
Reverse of the Bicentennial dollar (Type 2), minted 1975–1976

== Bicentennial on screen ==
=== Television ===
==== Related network television programs aired July 3–4, 1976 ====
- The Great American Celebration, a 12-hour syndicated entertainment program hosted by Ed McMahon and airing the night of July 3
- The Inventing of America (NBC), a two-hour BBC co-production reviewing 200 years of American technological innovations and their impact on the world, co-hosted by James Burke and Raymond Burr
- In Celebration of US (CBS), a 16-hour coverage hosted by Walter Cronkite
- The Glorious Fourth (NBC), a 10-hour coverage hosted by John Chancellor and David Brinkley
- The Great American Birthday Party (ABC), hosted by Harry Reasoner
- Happy Birthday, America (NBC), hosted by Paul Anka from the Los Angeles Memorial Coliseum
- Bob Hope's Bicentennial Star-Spangled Spectacular (NBC)
- Best of the Fourth (NBC), recap with John Chancellor and David Brinkley
- July 4 satellite broadcast of the University of North Texas One O'Clock Lab Band live performance in Moscow (NBC), sponsored by the US Department of State
- Days of Liberty (WABC-TV—New York), an animated holiday special
- Goodbye America (PBS), a mock "newscast" re-enacting a 1776 debate in the House of Commons concerning the future of the Thirteen Colonies
- Eastward Ho! (WPSX-TV), a half-hour documentary about the Bicentennial Wagon Train, produced by Pennsylvania State University (Penn State). Includes the show troupe, which traveled with the wagon train and performed at the campsite each night.

The Bicentennial Minute was a series of short vignettes aired on CBS from 1974 through the end of 1976 to mark the occasion.

==== Saturday morning Bicentennial programs ====
In the months leading up to the Bicentennial, Schoolhouse Rock!, a series of educational cartoon shorts airing on ABC between programs on Saturday mornings, created a sub-series called "History Rock". However, the official name was "America Rock". The ten segments covered various aspects of American history and government. Several of the segments, most notably "I'm Just a Bill" (discussing the legislative process) and "The Preamble" (which features a variant of the preamble of the Constitution put to music), have become some of Schoolhouse Rock's most popular segments.

=== Films ===
External videos
- Bicentennial City (June 7, 2020) on Vimeo

For the Bicentennial celebration, Hollywood filmmaker John Huston directed a short movie—Independence (1976)—for the US National Park Service which continues to screen at Independence National Historical Park in Philadelphia.

The 1976 film Rocky cited the Bicentennial in several scenes, mostly during Apollo Creed's entering; Carl Weathers dressed first as George Washington and then as Uncle Sam.

== Gifts for the nation ==
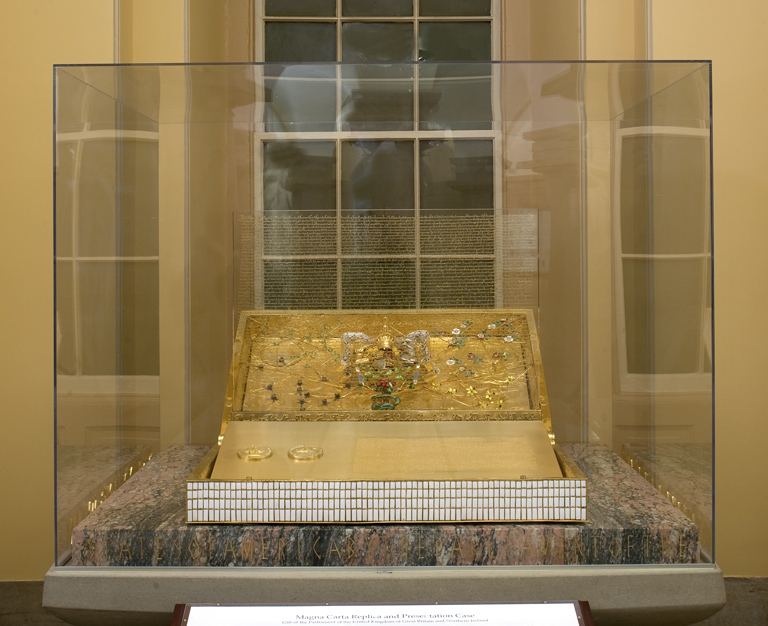
A Magna Carta replica in the display case

Several nations gave gifts to the US as a token of friendship.

The United Kingdom loaned one of the four existing copies of Magna Carta for display in the United States Capitol. The Capitol displayed the document in a case designed by artist Louis Osman consisting of gold, stainless steel, rubies, pearls, sapphires, diamonds, and white enamel. This was on a base of pegmatite and Yorkshire sandstone. The document was displayed atop a gold replica from June 3, 1976, until June 13, 1977, when it was returned. The case and gold replica remain on display in the Capitol.

Canada, through the National Film Board of Canada, produced the book Between Friends/Entre Amis, a photographic essay on life along the US-Canada border. Canada distributed the book to libraries across the US and presented special editions to President Ford and other officials.

The government of France and the Louvre assembled an exhibit of paintings in cooperation with the Detroit Institute of Arts and the Metropolitan Museum of Art that traveled to Detroit and New York City after being shown in Paris. The exhibit, entitled French Painting 1774–1830: The Age of Revolution, included the work of 94 French artists from that period. Many of the 149 works in the exhibit had never been seen outside France and included Liberty Leading the People by Eugène Delacroix, Jupiter and Thetis by Jean Auguste Dominique Ingres and a portrait of Maximilien Robespierre by Adélaïde Labille-Guiard.

Japan's government constructed and furnished the 513-seat Terrace Theatre of John F. Kennedy Center for the Performing Arts in Washington. Many of the original furnishings were removed during the theater's renovation between 2015 and 2019. Fifty-three bonsai trees from the Nippon Bonsai Association were donated to the US National Arboretum.

King Juan Carlos I and Queen Sofía of Spain presented sculptures of Bernardo de Gálvez, a hero of the American Revolutionary War period and later Viceroy of New Spain; and Don Quixote, Cervantes' fictional hero, on June 3, 1976, on behalf of their nation. The Gálvez sculpture is in a park at Virginia Avenue at 21st Street NW, which has been named Galvez Park. The Don Quixote sculpture was installed nearby on the grounds of The Kennedy Center. Spain's gift also included an exhibit at the National Gallery of Art of eight Goya masterpieces from the collection of Museo del Prado.

King of Norway Olav V, Prime Minister of Norway Odvar Nordli, and the Norwegian government established the Vinland National Health Sports Center in Loretto, Minnesota.

== Results ==
According to a final report for the American Revolution Bicentennial Administration there was a total of 66,484 events and projects between March 1975 and December 31, 1976. Of the 66,484 there were 27,489 projects and 38,995 events. Events were even tallied as happening abroad to celebrate the Bicentennial with a total of 654 events and projects being held.

== Gallery ==
Celebrating the United States Bicentennial

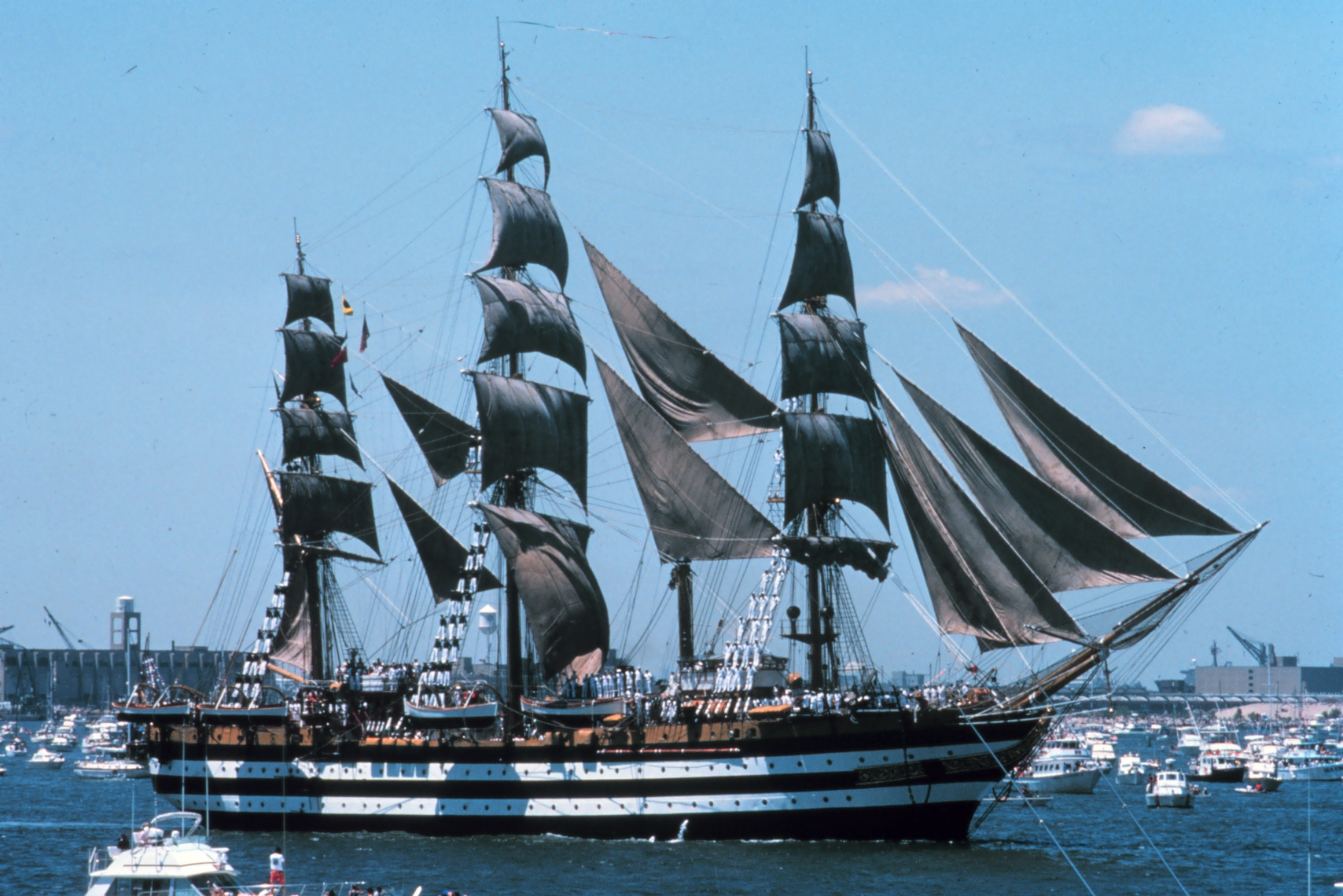
Italian tall ship Amerigo Vespucci in New York Harbor during the celebration

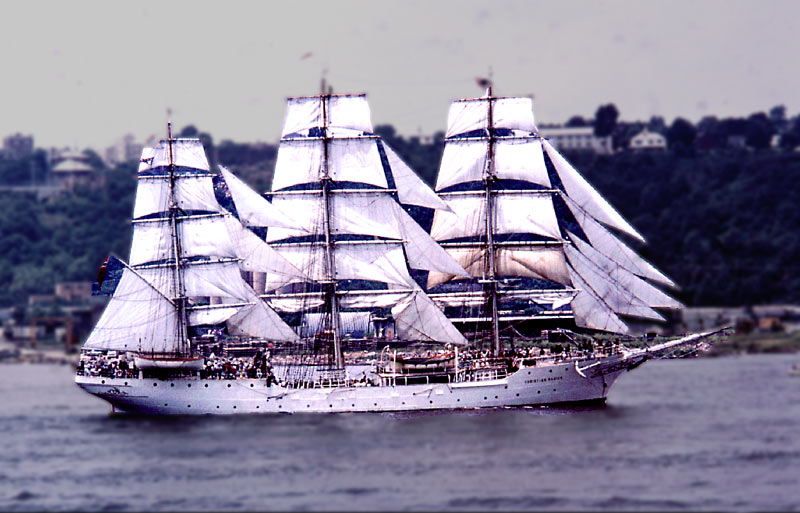
Norwegian rigged ship Christian Radich at Operation Sail on July 4, 1976

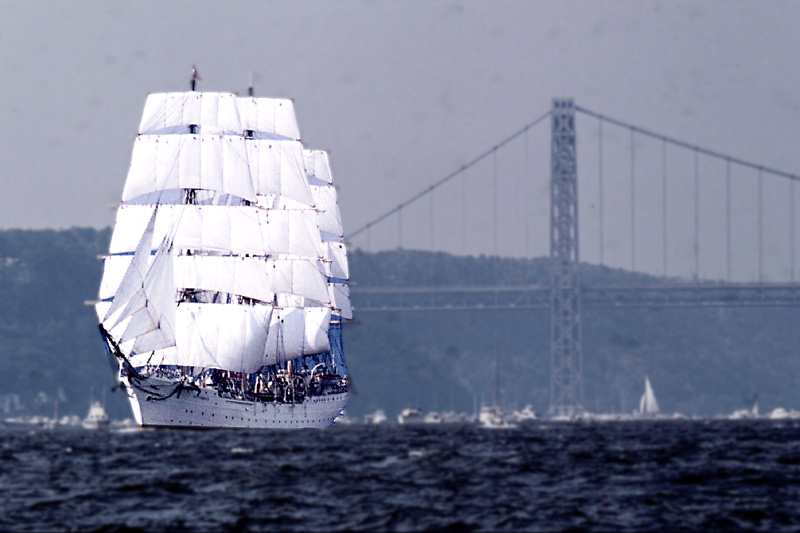
Polish three-mast ship Dar Pomorza during the Parade of Sail on July 4, 1976
United States Bicentennial Era Postage Stamps

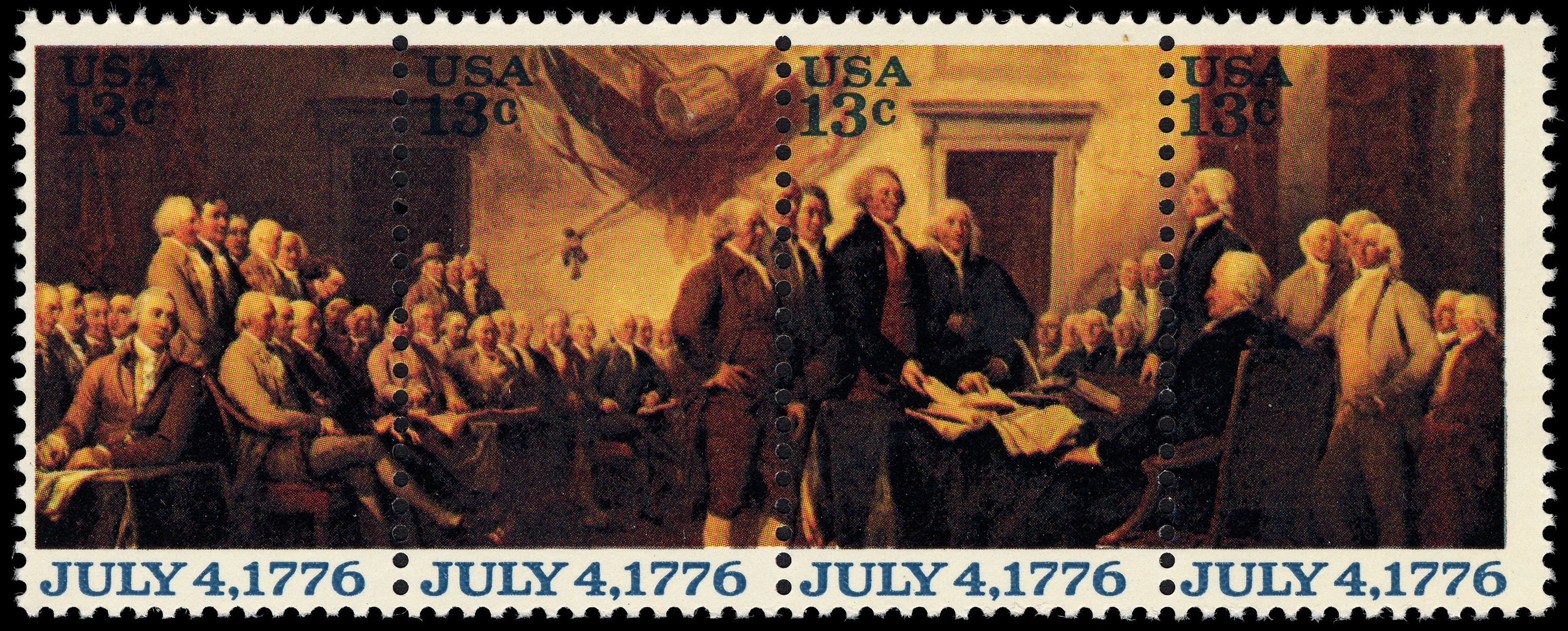
John Trumbull's 1818 oil painting depicting the introduction of the Declaration of Independence to the Continental Congress

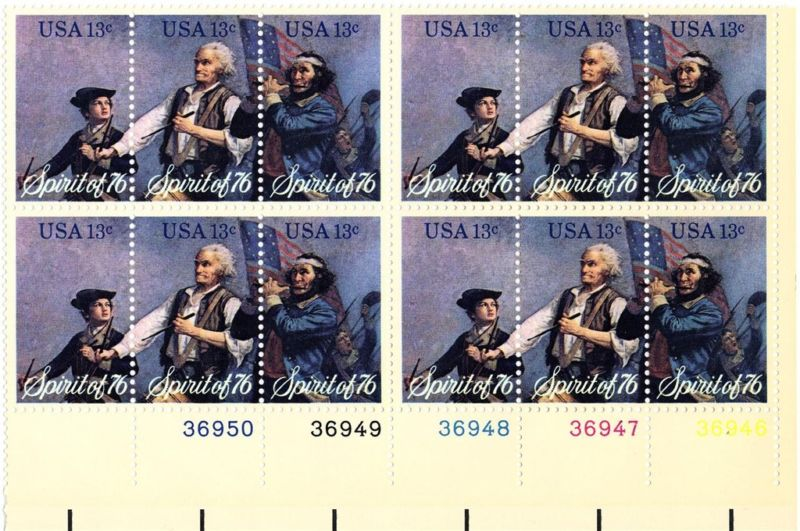
Archibald Willard c. 1875 oil painting The Spirit of '76 depicting a fife player and two drummers leading the Continental Army during the American Revolutionary War

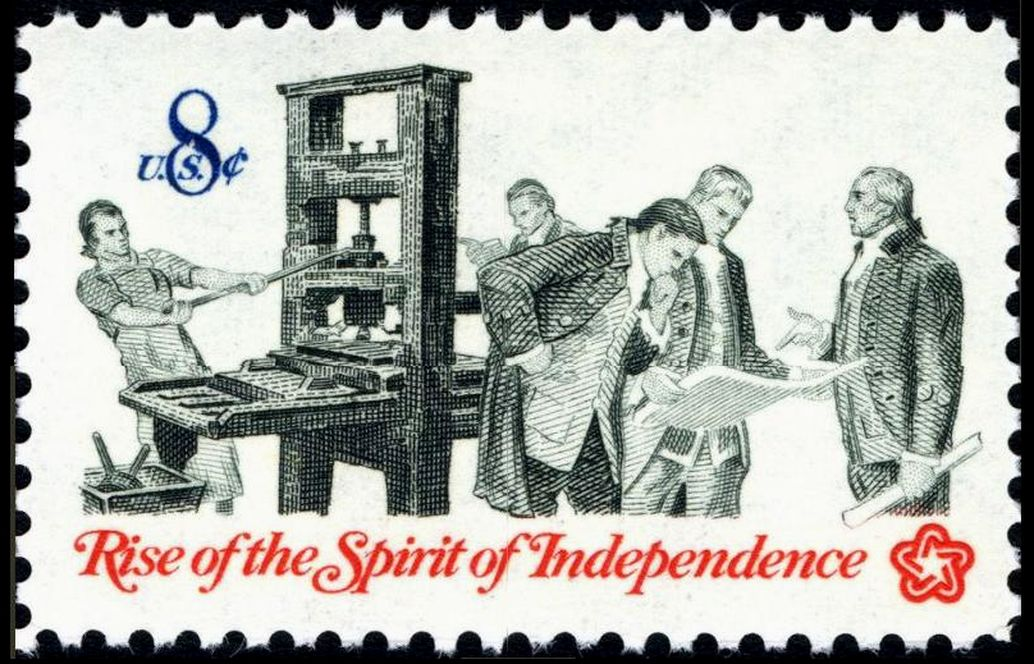
Patriots utilizing a printing press while examining a colonial pamphlet

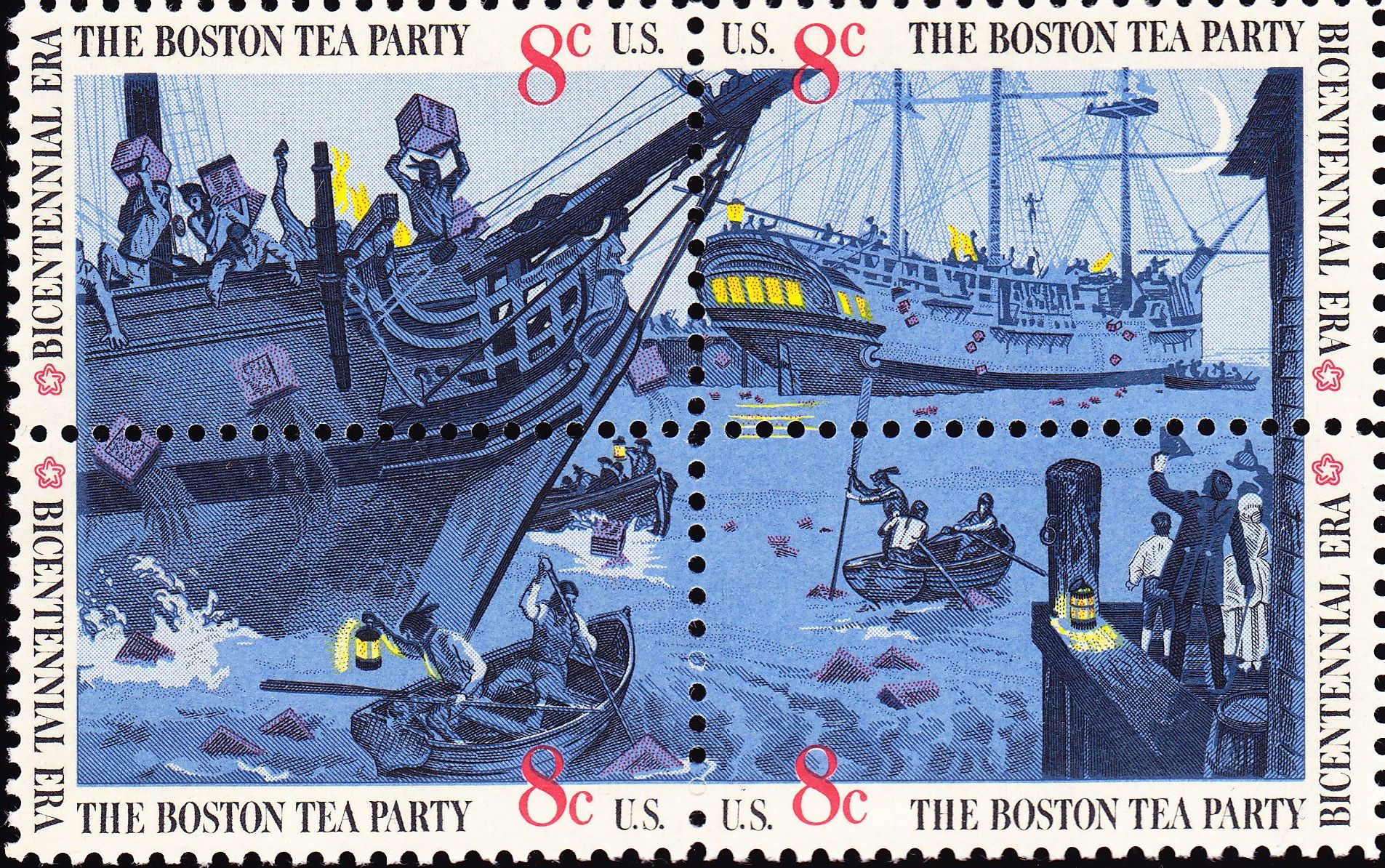
1773 depiction of the Boston Tea Party showing chests of tea being dumped into Boston Harbor on a late night by the Sons of Liberty to protest the Tea Act

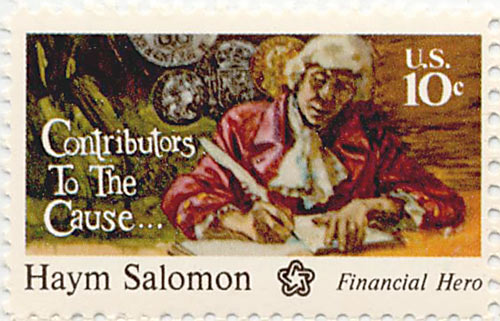
Haym Salomon was a colonial paymaster who raised money to help finance the American Revolution.

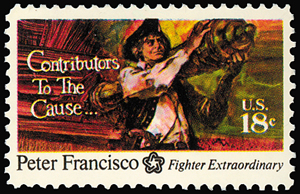
Peter Francisco participated in the Battle of Camden, where he physically seized a 1,000-pound cannon while departing the battlefield after the British defeated the Americans

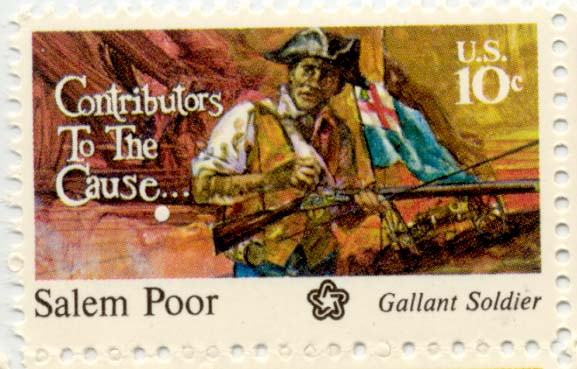
Salem Poor participated at the Battle of Bunker Hill and was credited with fatally wounding British officer James Abercrombie.

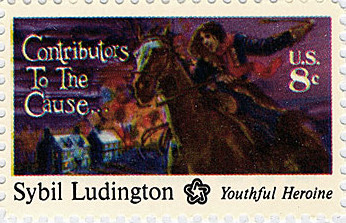
Sybil Ludington is said to have ridden through the night to advise minutemen that British forces were raiding Danbury, Connecticut; these accounts, originating from the Ludington family, are questioned by modern scholars.

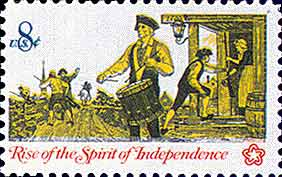
Patriots acknowledging the spirit of independence by honoring the drummer who marched into battle, or the drum as an instrument to alert neighbors of British Redcoats

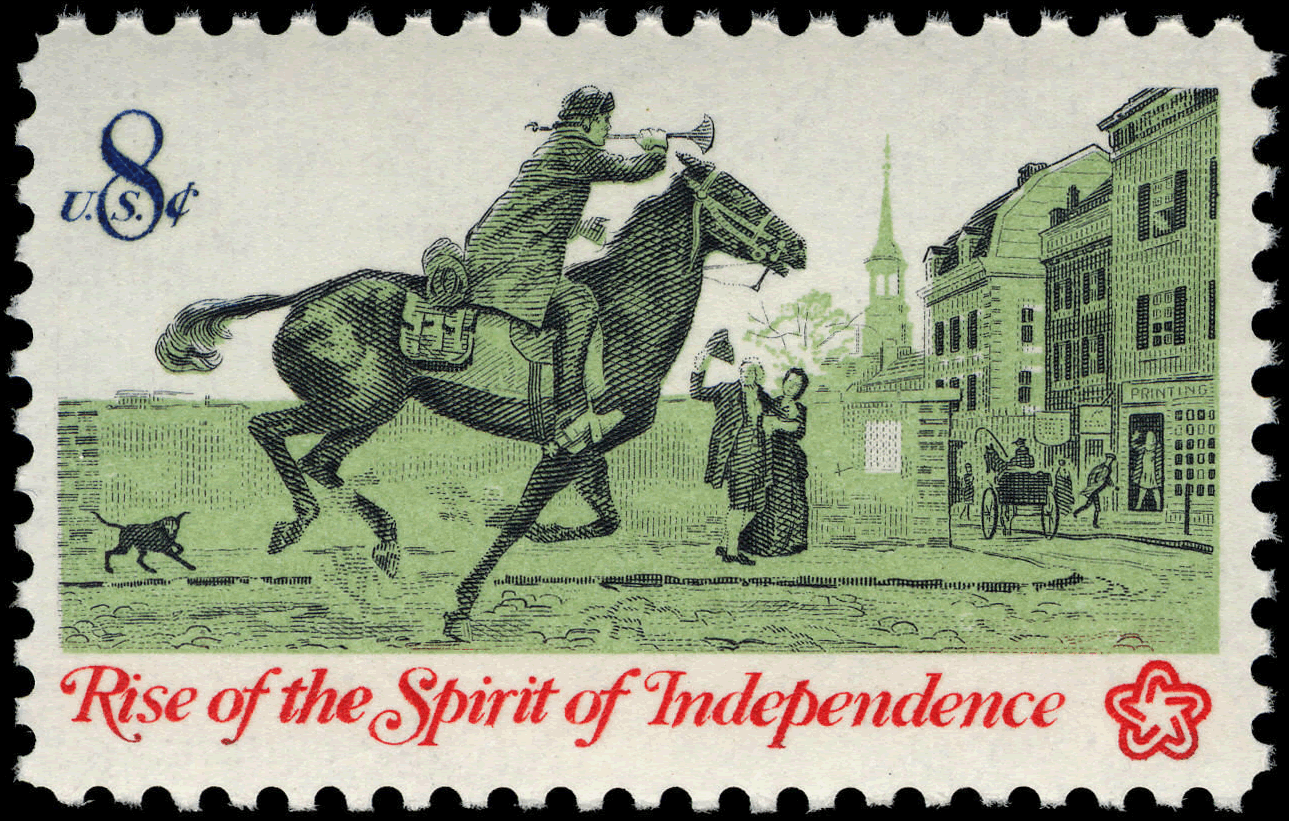
Patriots acknowledging the spirit of independence by honoring the post riders who delivered mail on horseback
Other Commemorative Items

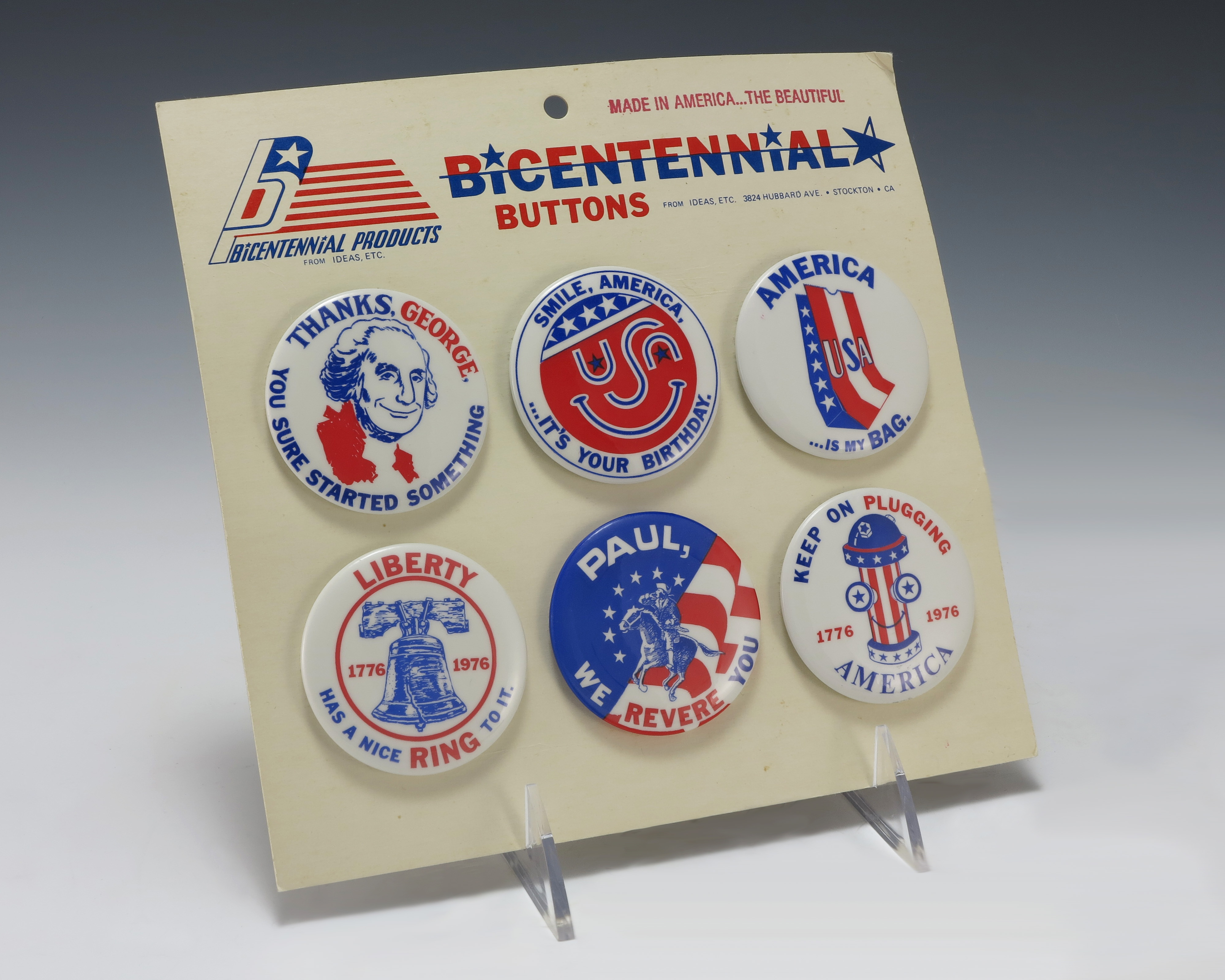
Six different Bicentennial buttons designed and sent by two art teachers to President Gerald Ford

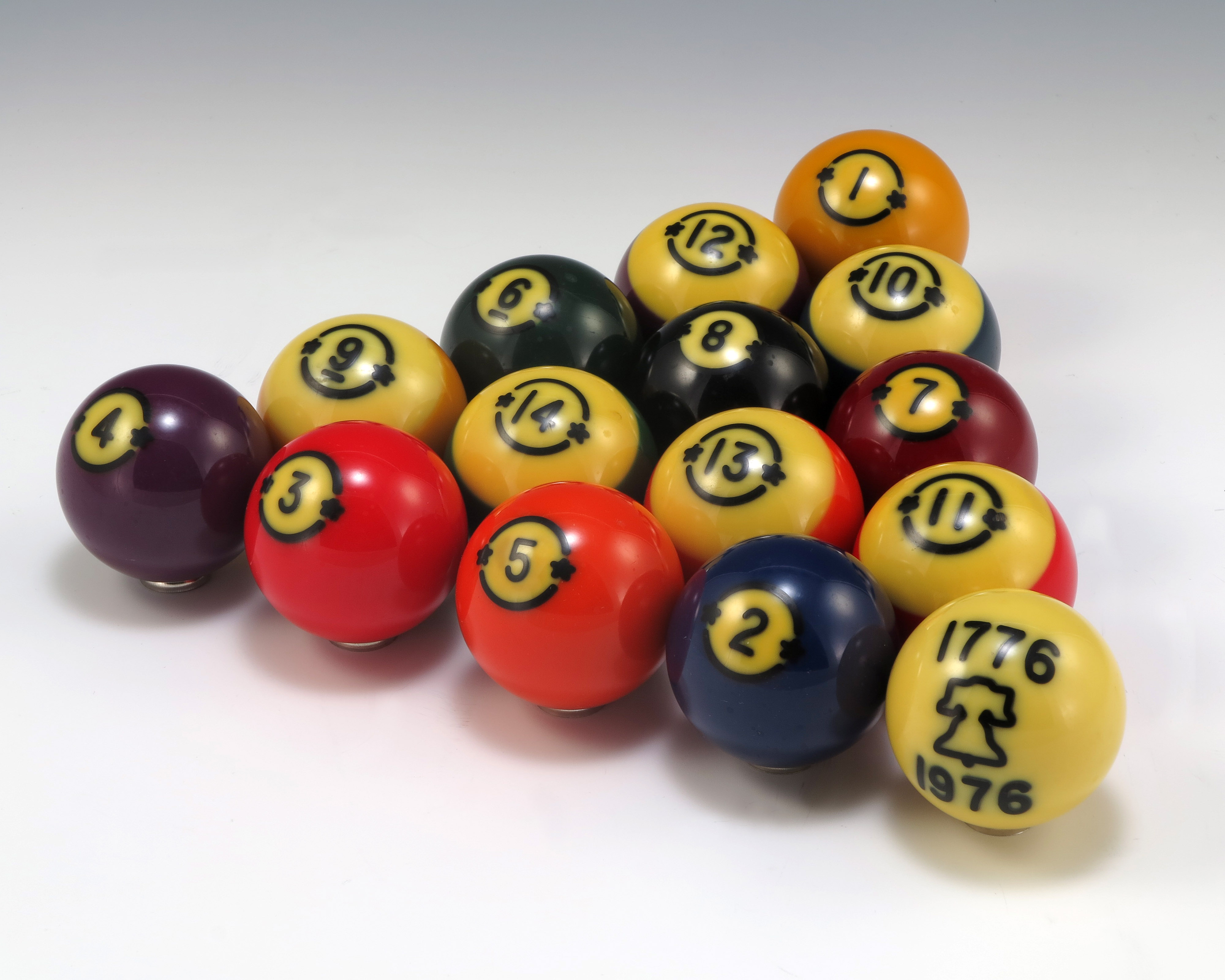
A box of 15 billiard balls specifically designed to commemorate the Bicentennial

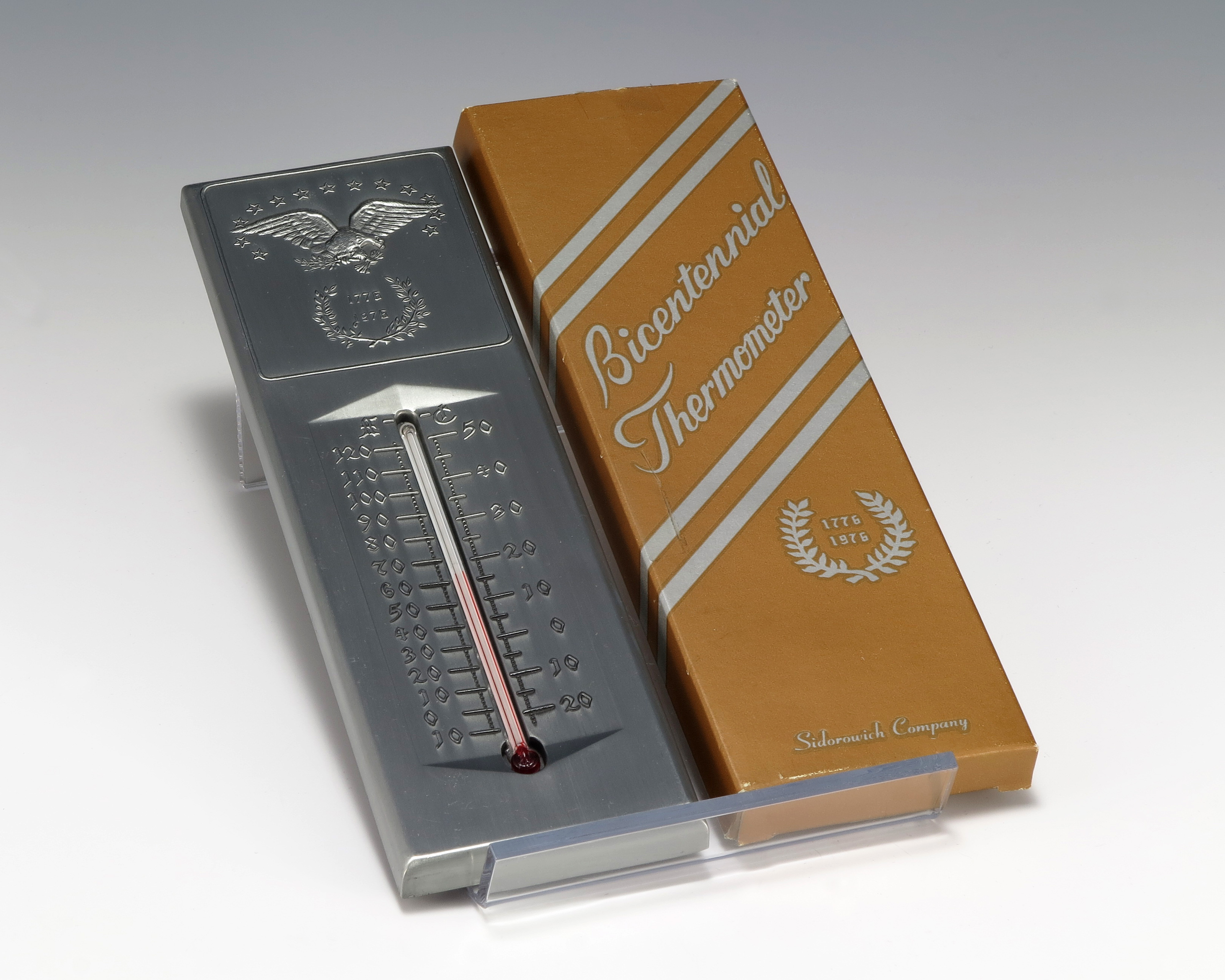
Commemorative pewter Bicentennial thermometer depicts an eagle above a laurel wreath with the "1776" and "1976" written inside.

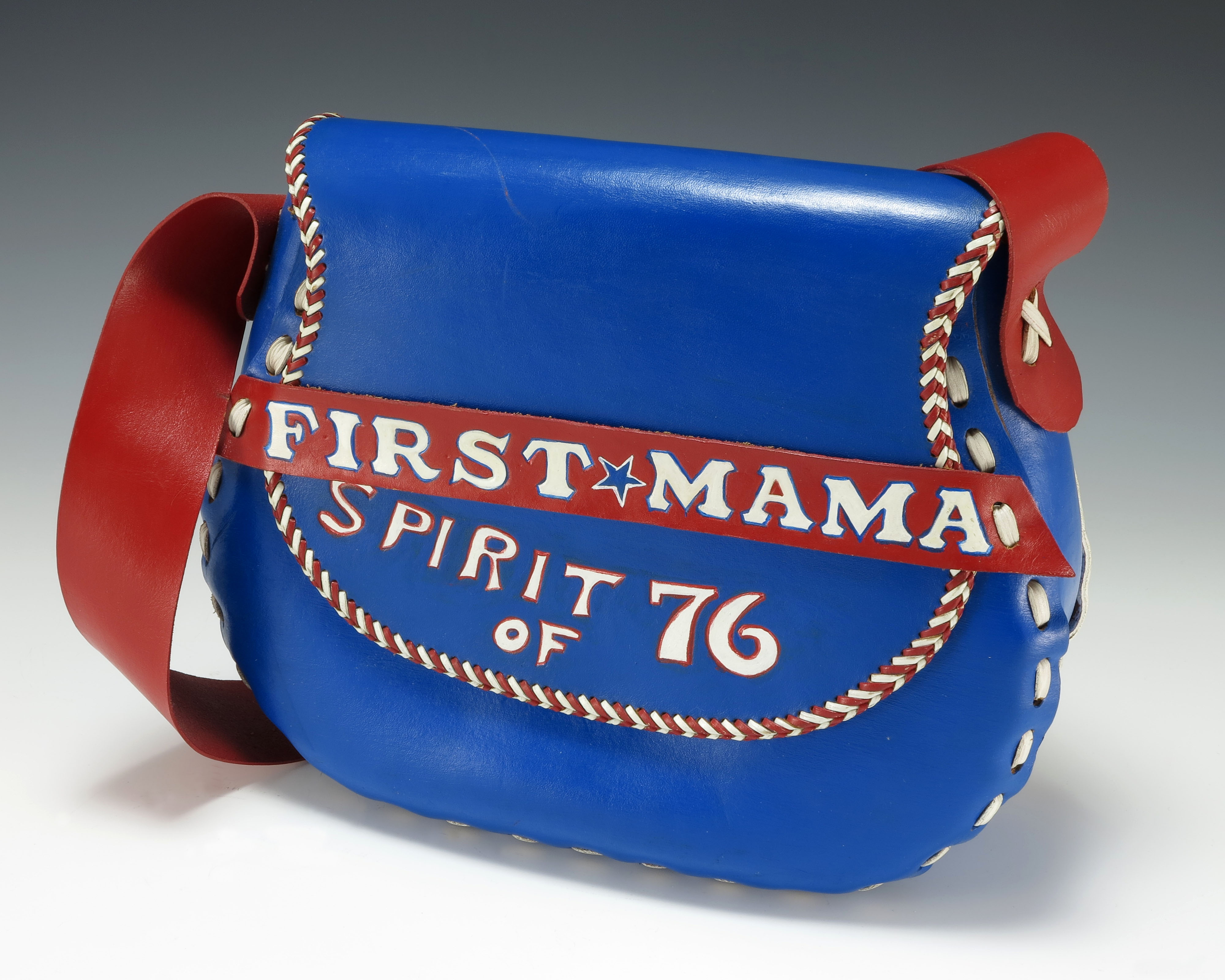
Betty Ford's "First Mama" purse

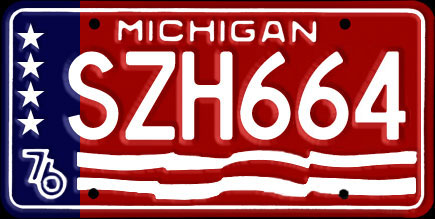
Special Michigan license plate design issued in honor of the Bicentennial. Plates of this design were standard issue for all passenger cars registered in Michigan receiving new plates in 1976.

== See also ==
- Bicentennial Minutes
- Bicentennial Series
- Bikecentennial
- Spirit of '76 Patriotic Sentiment
- Spirit of 76 pinball machine
- Utah State Route 95 - dedicated in 1976 as the "Bicentennial Highway"
- Centennial Exposition in Philadelphia (1876)
- Sesquicentennial Exposition in Philadelphia (1926)
- United States Semiquincentennial (2026)
