= Adventure Cycling Association =

American nonprofit member organization

- Formation: 1973
- Type: 501(c)(3) Nonprofit
- Legal status: Active
- Location: Missoula, Montana, United States
- Website: www.adventurecycling.org

Adventure Cycling Association is a nonprofit member organization focused on travel by bicycle (bicycle touring). Headquartered in Missoula, Montana, Adventure Cycling develops cycling routes, publishes maps, provides guided trips, and advocates for better and safer cycling in the U.S. The organization grew from a mass cross-country bicycle ride in 1976 to celebrate the U.S. Bicentennial. Adventure Cycling also publishes a magazine, Adventure Cyclist.

Adventure Cycling celebrated its 40th anniversary in 2016 by hosting the Montana Bicycle Celebration in Missoula, promoting events like Bike Your Park Day and Bike Travel Weekend, and publishing its first-ever coffee table book, America's Bicycle Route: The Story of the TransAmerica Bicycle Trail.

== Origins ==
Adventure Cycling Association was founded in 1973 as Bikecentennial by Dan and Lys Burden and Greg and June Siple during the couples' Hemistour bicycle ride from Anchorage, Alaska, to Tierra del Fuego, Argentina. They planned Bikecentennial as a cross-country bicycle ride to celebrate the bicentennial of the United States. More than 4,100 cyclists took part in the event, riding all or part of the coast-to-coast, 4,250 miles (6,840 km) TransAmerica Bicycle Trail during the summer of 1976. Once the event was completed, Bikecentennial lived on as a 501(c)(3) nonprofit member organization to serve the needs of traveling cyclists, developing more bicycle routes and publishing maps. In 1974, Bikecentennial began publishing Bike Report magazine, which later became Adventure Cyclist when the organization changed its name to Adventure Cycling Association in 1993.

== Overview ==
Adventure Cycling's mission is "to inspire, empower, and connect people to travel by bicycle." Its membership has grown to over 50,000 members, and its route network is one of the largest in the world, encompassing over 50,000 miles (80,000 km). Adventure Cycling is also leading the development of the U.S. Bicycle Route System, which when complete will offer more than 50,000 miles (80,000 km) of routes for cyclists.

Adventure Cycling's headquarters are located in Missoula, Montana, in the northern Rocky Mountains. Many traveling cyclists make a point of riding through Missoula, where they stop at Adventure Cycling to enjoy free ice cream, catch up on email, ask advice, and get a tour of the building. Many cyclists also have their photos taken, and some end up in Adventure Cycling's National Bicycle Touring Portrait Collection.

== Membership ==
Adventure Cycling is the largest nonprofit membership bicycling organization in North America with over 50,000 members. Individuals or families can join, as well as bike clubs and bike shops. There is also an option to join as a lifetime member.

== Adventure Cyclist magazine ==
Adventure Cyclist is published nine times per year for members of Adventure Cycling Association. It covers stories of bicycle travel in the U.S. and around the world, reviews bicycles and gear, and publishes essays and photos.

== Route network ==
The Adventure Cycling Route Network comprises more than 50,000 miles (80,000 km) of routes for bicycle touring and is the largest such network in North America.

== Tours ==
Adventure Cycling organizes bicycle tours all over the U.S., including Puerto Rico. Tours range in duration from a few days to a few months and in difficulty from family-friendly rides to expert-level tours through the high mountains. Adventure Cycling tours are self-contained, van-supported, fully supported, or inn-to-inn.

Cyclists can also take education courses through Adventure Cycling, such as their leadership training courses, which are mandatory for cyclists interested in leading Adventure Cycling tours.

For young people interested in leading tours or building their outdoor leadership skills, Adventure Cycling offers a two-track Young Adult Bike Travel scholarship program.

== Bicycle tourism ==
Adventure Cycling promotes bicycle tourism, in which cyclists ride from town to town and stay in campgrounds or motels, eat in restaurants, buy from grocery stores, and otherwise contribute to the economy of small towns.

== Bicycle Travel Awards ==
Adventure Cycling Association presents four awards every year to individuals or groups who have made a positive impact in the world of bicycle travel.

== See also ==
- Bicycle touring
- Bikeway safety
- Cycling infrastructure
- History of cycling infrastructure
- Long-distance cycling route
- National cycling route network
- United States Bicycle Route System
- American Association of State Highway and Transportation Officials
- National Association of City Transportation Officials
