= List of cycleways =

List of cycleways — for all types of cycleways, bike path, bike route, or bikeway's transportation infrastructure and/or designated route, listed by continents and their countries.

Greenways and/or rail trails can include a cycleway−bike path.

== Africa ==
- Freedom Trail (South Africa)

== Asia ==
=== Azerbaijan ===
- Cycling in Azerbaijan
- Velopark (Baku)
- Bike Lanes in Baku
- Bike Lanes in Qusar

=== China ===
- Tibetan Plateau Cycling Routes (along Sichuan and Yunnan Chinese provinces) 1600 km]
- Xiamen Bicycle Skyway

=== Hong Kong ===
For main article, see Cycleways in Hong Kong.

- New Territories Cycle Track Network (NTCTN)
- Shing Mun River
- Tai Lam Mountain Bike Trail
- Tolo Harbour

=== India ===
- Agra-Etawah Cycle Highway

=== Philippines ===
- Marikina
- Pasig
- Quezon City

=== Taiwan ===
- Jiahou Line Bikeway
- Old Caoling Tunnel

== Europe ==
=== EuroVelo routes ===
==== North - South routes ====
EV 1 - Atlantic Coast Route: North Cape - Sagres 8,186 km
EV 3 - Pilgrims Route: Trondheim - Santiago de Compostela 5,122 km
EV 5 - Via Romea Francigena: London - Rome and Brindisi 3,900 km
EV 7 - Middle Europe Route: North Cape - Malta 6,000 km
EV 9 - Baltic Sea to Adriatic Sea (Amber Route): Gdańsk - Pula 1,930 km
EV 11 - East Europe Route: North Cape - Athens 5,964 km
EV 13 - Iron Curtain Route: Barents Sea - Black Sea 10,400 km

==== West - East routes ====
EV 2 - Capitals Route: Galway - Moscow 5,500 km
EV 4 - Roscoff - Kyiv 4,000 km
EV 6 - Atlantic Ocean to Black Sea (Rivers Route): Nantes - Constanţa 3,653 km
EV 8 - Mediterranean Route: Cádiz - Athens 5,388 km

==== Circuits ====
EV 10 - Baltic Sea Cycle Route (Hansa circuit): 7,930 km
EV 12 - North Sea Cycle Route: 5,932 km

=== France ===
- Cycleways in France
- ViaRhôna, a cycling route alongside the Rhône

=== Germany ===
There are 200 German Cycle routes, with a combined total length of 70,000 kilometres (43,000 mi).

- Berlin-Copenhagen Cycle Route
- Donauradweg
- Elbe Cycle Route
- Rhön Cycleway
- Szczecin Lagoon Cycle Route
- Via Claudia Augusta

=== Italy ===
- Rete ciclabile nazionale italiana
- Ciclovia Adriatica

=== The Netherlands ===
- LF-routes, a network of marked cycle routes through the Netherlands
- other European cycle routes
- Other long-distance routes

=== Portugal ===
- EV1 The Atlantic Coast Route

=== Republic of Ireland ===
- Great Southern Trail
- Great Western Greenway
- Waterford Greenway

=== Spain ===
- 1800 km of public greenways on former railway routes throughout Spain
- TransAndalus
- TransCAM - Trans-Comunidad Autónoma de Madrid

=== United Kingdom ===
- National Cycle Network
- The National Byway

==== England ====
- List of cycle routes in England

===== London =====
- List of cycle routes in London

==== Northern Ireland ====
- National Cycle Route 9

==== Wales ====
- List of cycle routes in Wales

==== Scotland ====
- National Cycle Route 74
- National Cycle Route 75
- National Cycle Route 76
- National Cycle Route 77
- National Cycle Route 78

== Oceania ==
=== Australia ===
==== Queensland ====
- Boyne Burnett Inland Rail Trail
- Brisbane Valley Rail Trail
- Brisbane Bikeways, Brisbane
- Gold Coast Bikeways, Gold Coast
- Gold Coast Oceanway

==== Western Australia ====
- Munda Biddi Trail
- cycleways in Perth and surrounding areas

==== South Australia ====
- Amy Gillett Bikeway
- Anna Meares Bike Path
- Adelaide Southern Veloway
- Barossa Trail
- Coast to Vines Rail Trail
- Copper Coast Rail Trail
- Hamley Bridge–Gladstone railway line
- Marino Rocks Greenway
- Mawson Trail
- Mike Turtur Bikeway
- Mount Gambier railway line
- Patrick Jonker Veloway
- Rattler Rail Trail
- Riesling Trail
- Stuart O'Grady Bikeway
- Westside Bikeway

==== Victoria ====
===== Rail trails =====
- Bass Coast Rail Trail
- Great Southern Rail Trail

===== Melbourne cycleways =====
- Bay Trail (Australia)
- Capital City Trail
- Darebin Creek Trail
- Gardiners Creek Trail
- Main Yarra Trail
- Merri Creek Trail
- Djerring Trail
- Federation Trail
- EastLink Trail
- Upfield Bike Path
- M80 Trail
- Koonung Creek Trail
- Moonee Ponds Creek Trail
- Diamond Creek Trail
- Lilydale to Warburton Rail Trail
- Box Hill to Ringwood Rail Trail
- Outer Circle Trail

==== New South Wales ====
===== Rail trails =====
- Fernleigh Track

===== Sydney cycleways =====
- Cooks River cycleway
- Gore Hill and Epping Road cycleways
- GreenWay
- Louise Sauvage Pathway
- M2 cycleway
- M4 cycleway
- M5 cycleway
- M7 cycleway
- Parramatta Valley cycleway
- Prospect Creek cycleway
- Sydney Harbour Bridge cycleway
- Western Sydney Parklands–Canal Reserve cycleway
- Windsor Road cycleway

=== New Zealand ===
- Little River Rail Trail
- New Zealand Cycleway
- Northwestern Cycleway
- Otago Central Rail Trail
- Timber Trail

== North America ==
=== Canada ===
- Trans Canada Trail

==== British Columbia ====
- Central Valley Greenway - Greater Vancouver
- Galloping Goose Regional Trail - Victoria
- Lochside Regional Trail - Victoria
- Spirit Trail - North Vancouver, West Vancouver
- The Green Necklace - North Vancouver

==== Ontario ====
- Aviation Pathway - Ottawa
- Bike Trails in Ottawa
- Capital Pathway - Ottawa
- Experimental Farm Pathway - Ottawa
- Ganatchio Trail - Windsor
- Greenbelt Pathway - Ottawa
- Little River Extension - Windsor
- Ottawa River Pathway - Ottawa
- Pinecrest Creek Pathway - Ottawa
- Rideau Canal Western Pathway - Ottawa
- Rideau Canal Eastern Pathway - Ottawa
- Rideau River Eastern Pathway - Ottawa
- Riverfront Bike Trail - Windsor
- Watts Creek Pathway - Ottawa

==== Quebec ====
- Parc Linéaire Le P'tit Train du Nord
- Réseau express vélo - Montreal
- Route Verte
- Sentier De l'île - Gatineau
- Sentier des Pionniers - Gatineau
- Sentier de la Rivière-Gatineau - Gatineau
- Sentier du Lac-des-Fées - Gatineau
- Sentier du Lac-Leamy - Gatineau
- Sentier du Parc-de-la-Gatineau - Gatineau
- Sentier du Ruisseau-de-la-Brasserie - Gatineau
- Sentier du Ruisseau-Leamy - Gatineau
- Sentier du Voyageurs - Gatineau

=== United States ===
- Rail trail
  - List of rail trails

==== Multi-State ====
- Adirondack Park Loop Bicycle Route
- Allegheny Mountains Loop Bicycle Route
- American Discovery Trail
- Atlantic Coast Bicycle Route
- Bicycle Route 66
- East Coast Greenway
- Grand Canyon Connector Bicycle Route
- Great Divide Mountain Bike Route
- Great Parks Bicycle Route
- Great Rivers South Bicycle Route
- Green Mountains Loop Bicycle Route
- Idaho Hot Springs Mountain Bike Route
- Lake Erie Connector Bicycle Route
- Lewis & Clark Bicycle Trail
- Mississippi River Trail
- Pacific Crest Bicycle Trail
- North Lakes Bicycle Route
- Northern Tier Bicycle Route
- Pacific Coast Bicycle Route
- Sierra Cascades Bicycle Route
- Southern Tier Bicycle Route
- Spokane River Centennial Trail, WA-ID
- Tidewater Potomac Heritage Bicycle Route
- TransAmerica Bicycle Trail
- Underground Railroad Bicycle Route
- United States Bicycle Route System
- Western Express Bicycle Route

==== Alabama ====
- Chief Ladiga Trail

==== Arizona ====
- The Loop, Tucson

==== California ====
Northern California

- Alameda Creek Regional Trail
- Contra Costa County trails, San Francisco Bay Area
- Davis Bike Path
- Guadalupe River Trail
- Highway 87 Bikeway
- Highway 237 Bikeway
- Iron Horse Regional Trail
- Jedediah Smith Memorial Trail, Sacramento
- John W. Christian Greenbelt
- Los Gatos Creek Trail
- Ohlone Greenway
- San Francisco Bay Trail
- Stevens Creek Trail
- The Wiggle, San Francisco

Southern California

- List of Los Angeles bike paths
- List of Orange County bike paths
- List of San Diego bike paths
- Arroyo Seco bicycle path
- Ballona Creek bicycle path
- Coyote Creek bicycle path
- Culver Boulevard Median Bike Path
- Kern River Parkway
- Long Beach Green Belt path
- Los Angeles River bicycle path
- Los Angeles River Bikeway
- Marvin Braude Bike Trail, Santa Monica Bay
- G Line bicycle path, San Fernando Valley
- Mission Bay bike path
- Rio Hondo bicycle path
- San Diego Creek bicycle path
- San Gabriel River Bike Trail
- San Luis Rey River bike path
- Santa Ana River Trail
- Santa Clara River Trail
- Shoreline Pedestrian Bikepath
- Silver Strand bikeway

==== Colorado ====
- Boulder
- Historic Arkansas Riverwalk, in Pueblo

==== Connecticut ====
- Air Line State Park Trail
- Farmington Canal Trail
- Hop River State Park Trail
- Charter Oak Greenway
- Larkin State Park Trail
- Moosup Valley State Park Trail
- Putnam River Trail

==== Delaware ====
- Delaware Bicycle Route 1
- Jack A. Markell Trail
- Junction and Breakwater Trail
- Michael N. Castle Trail

==== Florida ====
- List of Florida paved bike trails
- Alden Road Bicycle Path
- Auburndale TECO Trail
- Baldwin Park Trail
- Bear Creek Nature Trail
- Blackwater Heritage State Trail
- Boca Grande Bike Path
- Cady Way Trail
- Candyland Park Trail
- Cape Haze Pioneer Trail
- Chain of Lakes Trail
- Citrus Trail
- Clermont Trail
- Coast-to-Coast trail
- Country Club Trail
- Courtney Campbell Causeway, at seminolecountyfl.gov
- Cross Seminole Trail
- Dinky Line Trail
- E. E. Williamson Trail
- East Central Regional Rail Trail
- Flagler Trail Flagler Trail, at seminolecountyfl.gov
- Flatwoods Park Trail
- Florida Connector Bicycle Route
- Florida Keys Overseas Heritage Trail
- Florida National Scenic Trail (mostly unpaved)
- Fort Fraser Trail
- Gainesville-Depot Avenue Trail
- Gainesville-Hawthorne Trail State Park
- Gainesville-Waldo Road Greenway
- General James A. Van Fleet State Trail
- Good Neighbor Trail
- Jacksonville-Baldwin Rail Trail
- John Yarbrough Linear Park
- Kewannee Trail
- Lake Minneola Scenic Trail
- Lake Okeechobee Scenic Trail
- Lake-to-Lake Trail
- Legacy Trail
- Little Econ Greenway
- Marjorie Harris Carr Cross Florida Greenway
- Metropath
- Nature Coast State Trail
- Palatka-Lake Butler State Trail
- Pensacola Beach Trail
- Pine Hills Trail
- Pinellas Trail
- Rinehart Road to Riverwalk Connector
- Riverwalk Trail
- Seminole Wekiva Trail
- South Dade Rail Trail
- South Lake Trail
- Spring to Spring Trail
- Suncoast Trail, developed in conjunction with the Suncoast Parkway
- Suwannee River Greenway at Branford
- Tallahassee-Georgia Florida and Alabama (GF&A) Trail
- Tallahassee-St. Marks Historic Railroad State Trail
- University Trail
- Upper Tampa Bay Trail
- Venetian Waterway Park
- West Orange Trail
- Wirz Park Trail
- Withlacoochee State Trail

==== Georgia ====
- List of Georgia State Bicycle Routes
- Atlanta Beltline
- Big Creek Greenway
- PATH400
- Silver Comet Trail
- Western Gwinnett Bikeway

==== Hawaii ====
- Oahu Bike Routes

==== Idaho ====
- Boise River Greenbelt
- Trail of the Coeur d'Alenes

==== Illinois ====
- Bicycling in Chicago
- Chicago lakefront trail
- Grand Illinois Trail - 535 miles
- Illinois Prairie Path

==== Indiana ====
- The 106: Multi-use path along 106th Street in Hamilton County. From Fishers near the Fall Creek Trail to Zionsville near the Big Four Trail.
- 146th Street Trail: Multi-use path along 146th Street in Hamilton County. From the Boone/Hamilton County border east to Southeastern Parkway. Approximately 12 miles (19 km).
- Anderson Trails: Anderson
- Auburn Trails - DeKalb County Trails: Auburn
- B&O Trail: rail trail, West Michigan Streen near downtown Indianapolis to west of Brownsburg
- B-Line Trail: rail trail in Bloomington
- Bluffton River Greenway: (2.5 miles (4.0 km)) Bluffton
- Big Four Trail: 23.1 miles (37.2 km) rail trail in two segments, one from Zionsville to Whitestown and one from Lebanon to Colfax
- Calumet Trail: Northwest Indiana, located along the utility right-of-way in the Indiana Dunes National Park
- Cardinal Greenway: rail trail (60 miles (97 km), longest trail in Indiana) Richmond to Marion
- Clarksville Discovery Trail: Clarksville
- Decatur River Greenway:
- Erie Lackawanna Trail: Hammond to Crown Point
- Fall Creek Greenway: Indianapolis
- Fort Wayne Rivergreenway and Pufferbelly Trail: Fort Wayne
- Hagan Burke Trail: Carmel
- Indianapolis Cultural Trail: 8.1 miles (13.0 km)
- Industrial Heritage Trail: (5.7 miles (9.2 km)) Kokomo. The Industrial Heritage Trail extends the Nickel Plate Trail from Cassville through Kokomo
- Midland Trace Trail: rail trail, Westfield and Noblesville
- Monon South: 20 miles (32 km) rail trail in 5 sections between Mitchell and New Albany
- Monon Trail (Central Indiana):rail trail, Indianapolis, Carmel and Westfield
- Monon Trail (Northwest Indiana): Munster and Hammond
- National Road Heritage Trail: Terre Haute
- New Haven River Greenway:
- Nickel Plate Trail (North-Central Indiana Segment): (38 miles (61 km)) Rochester to Cassville (near Kokomo), with a short gap in Peru
- Nickel Plate Trail (Central Indiana Segment): 17.1 miles (27.5 km) from 42nd Street at the Monon Trail in Indianapolis to the Midland Trace Trail at Pleasant Street in Noblesville.
- Oak Savannah Trail: Griffith to Hobart
- Ohio River Greenway: Clarksville, Jeffersonville, and New Albany
- Panhandle Pathway: (22 miles) South of Winamac, Indiana in Cass County to outside Logansport in Pulaski County with plans to extend the trail into Winamac
- Parke Community Rail Trail: Rockville
- Pennsy Greenway: Lansing, Illinois to Schererville
- Pennsy Trail: rail trail Indianapolis to Greenfield
- Porter-Brickyard Trail: Porter, Indiana, linking the Calumet Trail to the Prairie Duneland Trail in Chesterton, partially in the Indiana Dunes National Park.
- Prairie Duneland Trail: Portage to Chesterton
- Pumpkinvine Nature Trail: Elkhart and LaGrange Counties
- White River Greenway: Carmel
- White River Greenway: Muncie
- White River Greenway: Noblesville
- White River Wapahani Trail: Indianapolis
- Wildcat Creek Walk of Excellence: 3.34 miles (5.38 km) Kokomo. Intersects with Industrial Heritage Trail along the Wildcat Creek in downtown Kokomo.

==== Iowa ====
- Cedar Valley Trail
- Chichaqua Valley Trail
- Clive Greenbelt Trail
- Great Western Bike Trail of Central Iowa
- Heart of Iowa Nature Trail
- Heritage Trail
- High Trestle Trail - formerly Ankeny to Woodward Trail
- Krushchev in Iowa Trail - formerly Corn Diplomacy Trail
- Raccoon River Valley Trail
- Summerset Trail
- T-Bone Trail
- Wabash Trace Nature Trail

==== Kansas ====
- Wichita has a system of 46.9 miles (75.5 km) of dedicated (off-street) bicycle paths, providing access to most parts of the city.

==== Kentucky ====
- Cherokee Park Loop (Louisville)
- Levee Bike Trail (Louisville)
- Metro Loop- planned 110 mile trail around Louisville (to be complete by 2017)
- Mill Creek Bike Trail (Louisville)
- Riverwalk Bike Trail (Louisville)

==== Louisiana ====
- Comite/Hooper Trail - Baton Rouge
- Mississippi River Trail
- Tammany Trace

==== Maryland ====
- Allegheny Highlands Trail of Maryland
- Baltimore & Annapolis Trail
- Chesapeake and Ohio Canal Path
- Capital Crescent Trail
- Washington, Baltimore and Annapolis Trail

==== Massachusetts ====
- Boston
- Cape Cod and the Islands
- Central Massachusetts
- Metro Boston
- Minuteman Bikeway
- North Shore
- Somerville Community Path
- South Shore
- Western Massachusetts

==== Michigan ====
- Grayling Bicycle Turnpike
- Lansing River Trail
- M-185 on Mackinac Island
- Northern Tier Trail in East Lansing

==== Minnesota ====
- Blufflands State Trail (Root River trail and Harmony-Preston Valley trail)
- Cannon Valley Trail
- Cedar Lake Trail
- Central Lakes Trail
- Douglas State Trail
- Gateway State Trail
- Grand Rounds Scenic Byway
- Lake Wobegon Trails
- Luce Line State Trail
- Midtown Greenway
- Paul Bunyan Trail
- Sakatah Singing Hills State Trail
- Southwest LRT Trail
- Willard Munger State Trail

==== Mississippi ====
- Longleaf Trace

==== Missouri ====
- Katy Trail State Park

==== Montana ====
- Gallagator Trail
- Paramount Trail (State Park Trail)
- Bitteroot Trail
- Giant Springs Trail (State Park Trail)
- Parkline Trail
- Swan River Trail
- Sourdough Trail
- Vista Trail (State Park Trail)

==== Nebraska ====
- Cowboy Trail
- Jamaica North Trail
- MoPac Trail

==== New Hampshire ====
- Franconia Notch and Presidentials Rail Trail

==== New Jersey ====
- Edgar Felix Bikeway
- Henry Hudson Trail
- Sussex, Paulinskill Valley, Columbia, and Delaware & Raritan Rail trails and the Lowantaka Recreation Path
- Traction Line Recreation Trail, Morris Township

==== New Mexico ====
- List of New Mexico State Bike Routes

==== New York ====
- List of trails in New York
- List of New York State Bicycle Routes
- Adirondack Park Loop Bicycle Route
- Brooklyn-Queens Greenway
- Lake Minnewaska Bike Trail
- Manhattan Waterfront Greenway
- North County Trailway
- South County Trailway
- Walkill Valley Rail Trail
- Westchester and Putnam County Trailways

==== North Carolina ====
- List of bicycle routes in North Carolina
- American Tobacco Trail

==== Ohio ====
- Conotton Creek Trail
- Lebanon Countryside Trail
- Little Miami Scenic Trail
- List of rail trails#Ohio
- North Coast Inland Trail
- Miami Valley Rail Trails
- Rail Trails, Towpaths And Other Trails In Ohio

==== Oklahoma ====
- Legacy Trail

==== Oregon ====
- Banks-Vernonia State Trail- (paved 21 miles)

==== Pennsylvania ====
- Abandoned Pennsylvania Turnpike
- BicyclePA Routes
- Chester Valley Trail
- Cross County Trail
- Cynwyd Heritage Trail
- Ghost Town Trail
- Liberty Bell Trail
- P&W Trail
- Pennypack Trail
- Perkiomen Trail
- Power Line Trail
- Reading Viaduct
- Schuylkill River Trail
- US 202 Parkway Trail

==== Rhode Island ====
- Blackstone River Bikeway
- East Bay Bike Path
- South County Bike Path

==== South Dakota ====
- George S. Mickelson Rail Trail

==== Tennessee ====
- The Hampline, Memphis
- Maryville Alcoa Greenway
- Shelby Farms Greenline, Memphis
- Shelby Park (Nashville), Nashville (Shelby Bottoms Greenway)
- Tennessee Riverwalk, Chattanooga

==== Texas ====
List of cycleways in Austin, Texas

- Austin Veloway (Cycle and Skate Trail - South of Austin in Travis County)
- Caprock Canyons Trailway (Rails to Trails - Runs 64 miles along the Caprock Escarpment from South Plains to Estelline)
- George Bush Park (Hike & Bike Trail - West of Houston in Harris County)
- Terry Hershey Park (Hike & Bike Trail - West of Houston in Harris County)
- Northeast Texas Trail (132 miles)

==== Utah ====
- Jordan River Parkway - Utah Lake to Thanksgiving Point
- Jordan River Parkway - Salt Lake County
- Union Pacific Rail Trail (Park City to Echo Reservoir)
- Utah Cliffs Loop Bicycle Route
- Utah Mountain Biking

==== Vermont ====
- Vermont Bike Trails

==== Virginia ====
Washington and Old Dominion Trail

==== Washington ====
- Burke-Gilman Trail (20 miles)
- Chehalis Western Trail, Olympia, WA (21 miles)
- Chief Sealth Trail
- Green River Trail, King County, WA (19 miles)
- Interurban Trail, King County, WA (14 miles)
- Olympic Discovery Bike Trail, Sequim-Port Angeles, WA (23 miles paved)
- Pierce County Foothills Trail, Puyallup-South Prairie, WA (11 miles)
- Spokane River Centennial Trail, Spokane, WA (37 miles)
- Washington Parks Bicycle Route
- Yelm Tenino-Trail, WA (14 miles)

==== Wisconsin ====
- 400 State Trail - (22.0 mi or 35.4 km) - The 400 State Trail connects to the Elroy-Sparta State Trail in Elroy.
- Ahnapee State Trail - (48.0 mi or 77.2 km)
- Alpha Mountain Bike Trail
- Badger State Trail (40.0 mi or 64.4 km)
- Bearskin State Trail (21.5 mi or 34.6 km)
- Buffalo River State Trail (36.0 mi or 57.9 km)
- Burlington-Kansasville State Trail
- Capital City State Trail (17 mi or 27 km)
- Cattail State Trail
- Chippewa River State Trail
- Devil's River State Trail
- Eisenbahn State Trail
- Elroy-Sparta State Trail
- Fox River State Recreational Trail
- Friendship State Trail
- Gandy Dancer State Trail
- Glacial Drumlin State Trail
- Great River State Trail
- Green Circle State Trail
- Hank Aaron State Trail
- Hillsboro State Trail
- Kinnickinnic River Trail
- La Crosse River State Trail
- Mascoutin Valley State Trail
- Military Ridge State Trail
- Mountain-Bay State Trail
- New Berlin Trail
- Newton Blackmour State Trail
- Nicolet State Trail
- Oak Leaf Trail
- Oconto River State Trail
- Old Abe State Trail
- Ozaukee Interurban Trail
- Pecatonica State Trail
- Powerline Trail
- Red Cedar State Trail
- Saunders State Trail
- Sugar River State Trail
- Stower Seven Lakes State Trail
- Three Eagle Trail
- Tomorrow River State Trail
- Tuscobia State Trail
- White River State Trail
- Wild Goose State Trail
- Wild Rivers State Trail
- Wiouwash State Trail
- Wolf River State Trail

== South America ==
=== Argentina ===
==== Patagonia ====
- Arroyo Las Bayas (in Spanish)
- Bariloche
- Bariloche (Small Circuit)
- Bosque de Arrayanes, Villa la Angostura
- Catedral Tour de los Lagos
- Parque Nacional Los Alerces expedition trail
- San Martín de los Andes

=== Argentina/Chile ===
- Palena Valley Circuit expedition trail

=== Chile ===
- Andes to the Pacific expedition trail
- Futaleufu River Valley expedition trail
- Ciclorecreovia
- Mapocho 42K

=== Colombia ===
- Bogota Ciclovía

== See also ==
- Cycleways topics
- Lists of bicycle routes
- List of long-distance footpaths
- List of rail trails
- Outline of cycling
- Offroad cycling
- Road bicycle racing
- Track cycling
