= Munich–Regensburg–Prague Cycleway =

Portion of cycling routes in Europe

The Munich–Regensburg–Prague Cycleway is part of an international network of cycling routes all over Europe.

The route starts in Prague on the Vltava, heads south-west to Plzeň, Furth im Wald and Regensburg before turning south to Munich. The route runs for 450 km.

The route is not generally signposted, it is instead an amalgam of other local routes, notably Czech Route 3, the Regental Radweg, the Donauradweg and the Isarradweg.
