= South Bay Salt Works =

Salt factory in southern San Diego, US

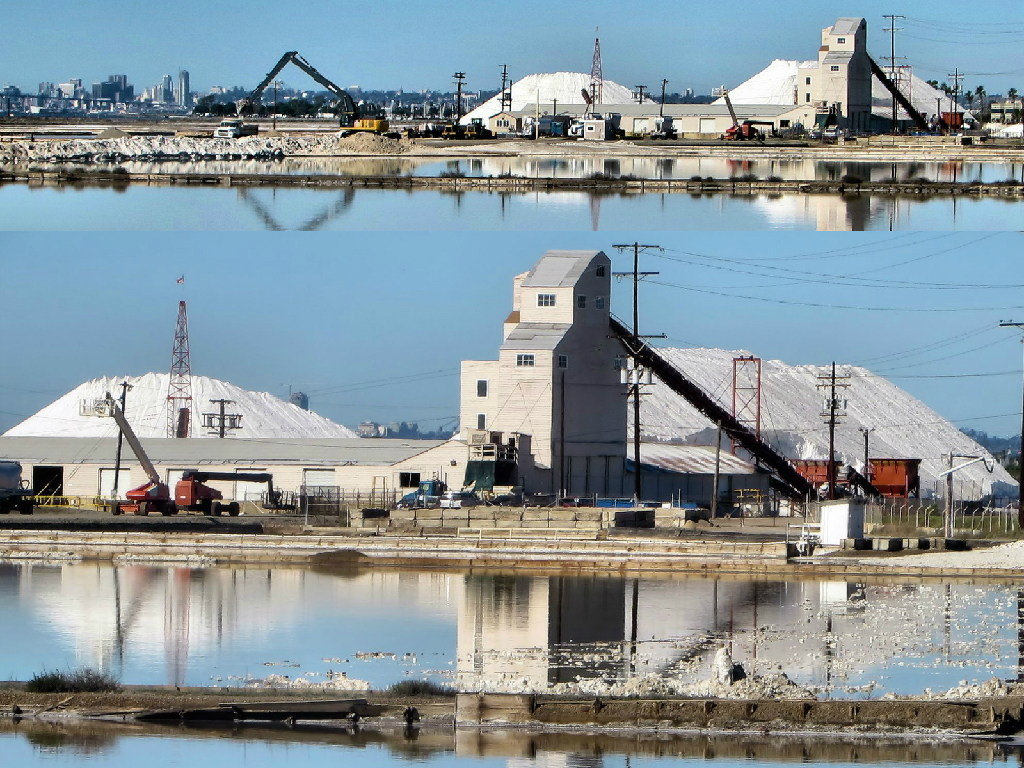
- Salt Works montage
- Coordinates: 32°36′5″N 117°5′34″W
- Products: Magnesium chloride Salt

The South Bay Salt Works is a salt factory in southern San Diego near Chula Vista, in the South Bay region of San Diego County, California.

Initially operating under the name La Punta Salt Works operations dating back to at least 1871, for a period of time it was the sole supplier of salt for Southern California. In 1902 it was purchased and renamed Western Salt Company, and later had narrow-gauge rail installed. During the rest of the 20th century, it was California's second-largest salt producer. The land was purchased by the San Diego County Regional Airport Authority in 1999 and transferred to the United States Fish and Wildlife Service. In 2000, it assumed its current name and has continued salt harvesting operations.

Water evaporated at the salt works comes from the Pacific Ocean. Since its inception, more than a million tons of salt has been harvested. The salt ponds are a stopping point for migratory birds; some of these birds are threatened or endangered. In 2011, two of the works' salt ponds were restored to marshlands.

== History ==
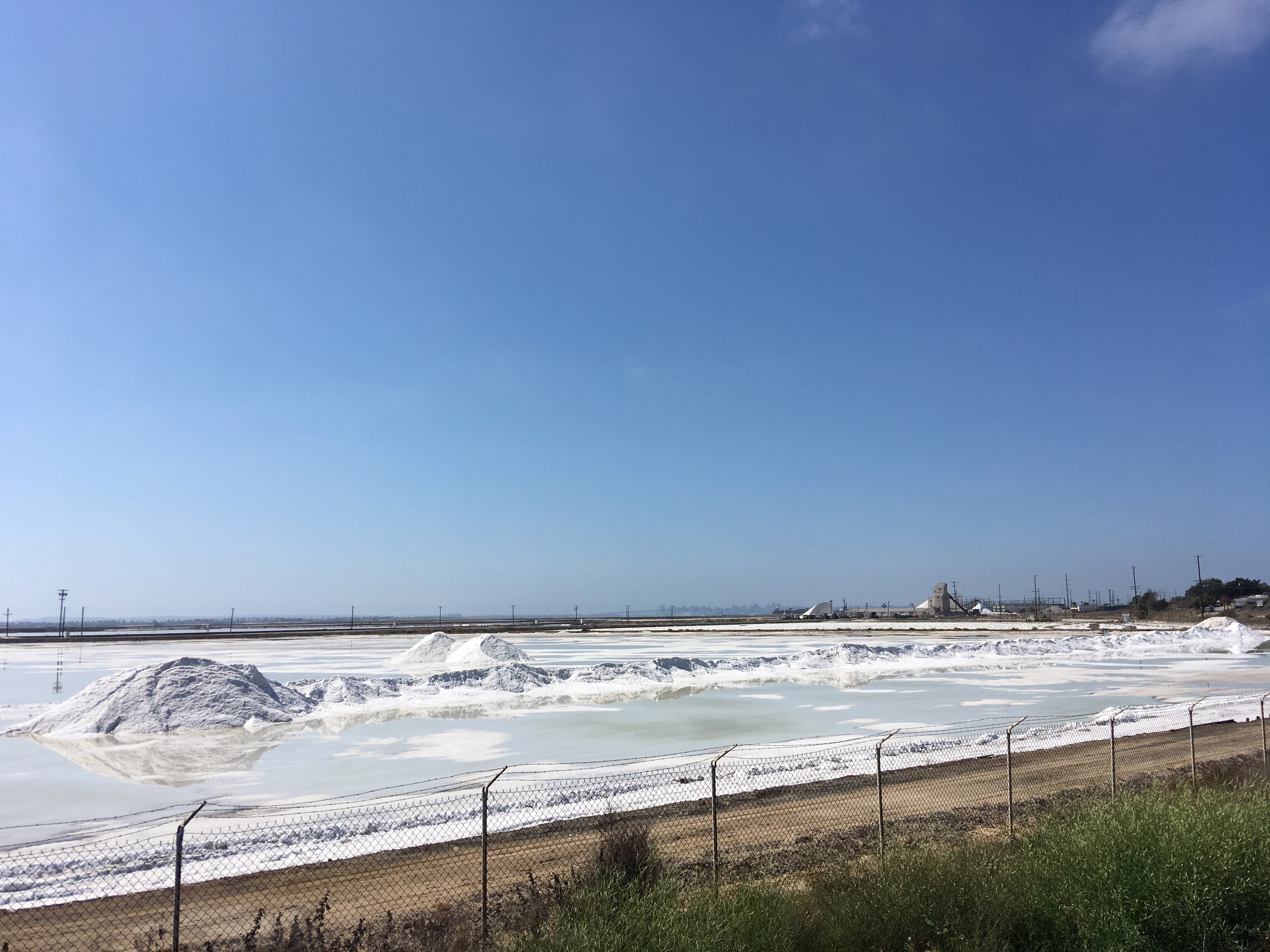
Salt evaporation ponds and mounds of crystallized salt awaiting the harvest

Initially the operation began as the La Punta Salt Company, founded by the Shaffer Brothers. Records date its origin as being before 1872. This is supported by a 1965 report by the State of California, and a 2015 notice by the City of Imperial Beach state that the area has been used as a salt works as early as the 1860s. In 1883, the salt works were the only salt producer in the county, supplying the salt needs of all of Southern California. Around the turn of the 20th century, the salt works were the only industrial employment in the Chula Vista area, other than produce-packing plants.

In 1902, La Punta Salt Works was purchased, and renamed to Western Salt Company. In the 1910s, about forty thousand tons of salt were harvested annually from the salt works. In 1915, a narrow-gauge railway was installed, and crossed over the standard-gauge railway of the San Diego and Arizona Railway; the narrow-gauge railway was dismantled in the 1970s, except for where it crossed over standard-gauge rail, preserving the only instance of such an occurrence in the United States. In 1916, operations were disrupted due to flooding; the flood destroyed the salt ponds and the salt works built up to that point. In 1918, reconstruction began due to damage caused during the 1916 flooding, reaching completion in the 1950s. After the 1910s, other salt producers in San Diego County closed, leaving the salt works as the sole salt producer in the county.

In the 1920s another company, California Chemical Corporation, extracted bromine from the waters of the salt ponds.In addition the company also produced magnesium chloride, beginning as early as the 1910s. Production of bromine ended after World War II.

In 1922, the salt works were acquired by Henry G. Fenton. For the majority of the 20th century, the amount of salt harvested at the salt works remained relatively constant. In 1958, Western Salt Company was the second largest salt producer in California, which also had salt production operations in Newport Beach at the time. As late as 1978, the salt works supplied the salt needs of San Diego's tuna fleet. In 1999, the salt ponds were sold to the San Diego County Regional Airport Authority, transferring the salt ponds to the United States Fish and Wildlife Service; both have leased it out for continued salt harvesting. The leasers are a company formed by former employers of Western Salt Company, who changed the name to its present name, maintaining the buildings as private property of the salt works itself. In 2005, the right-of-way of the former Coronado Belt Line in the salt pools was designated historic by the city of San Diego and later converted into a bike path as part of the Bayshore Bikeway. In 2009, the city of San Diego claimed land-use authority over the property. In 2011, two of the works' salt ponds were restored to marshlands. Additional work is a requirement of the permit for the Carlsbad desalination plant.

== Operations ==
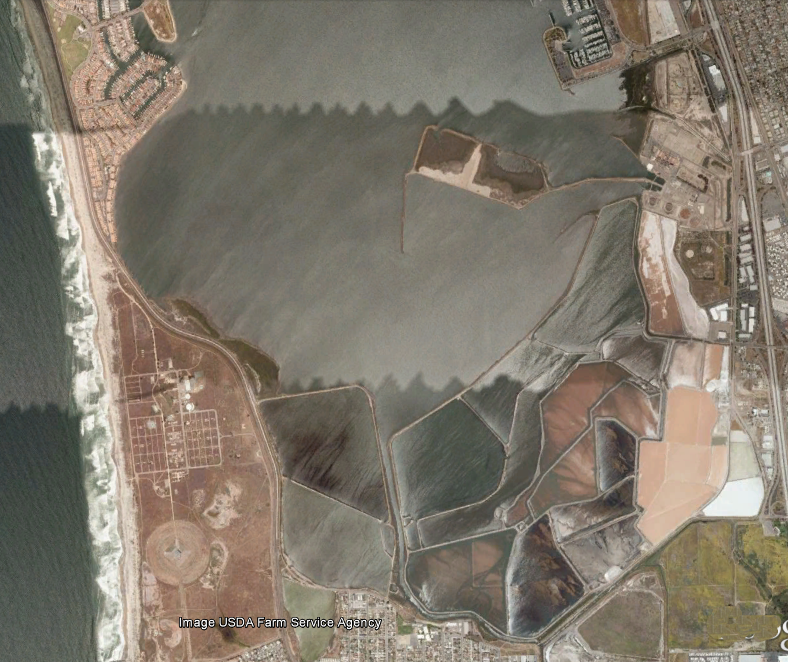
Satellite view of the salt ponds.

The operation is the second-longest-running business in San Diego, behind the San Diego Union Tribune. In Chula Vista, it is the city's longest running business. Although in the Chula Vista area, it is not within the Chula Vista city limits; the property is actually in the Nestor neighborhood. The buildings of the salt works are eligible to be placed on the U.S. National Register of Historic Places; the buildings are already on the California Register of Historical Places.

On the West Coast of the United States, only San Francisco Bay and San Diego Bay have the natural conditions that allow for salt extraction from sea salt to be feasible. Water evaporated at the salt works come from the Pacific Ocean, not San Diego Bay. The salt works produces about 75,000 tons of salt every year from salt ponds that cover over a thousand acres of land. Since operations began at the salt works, more than a million and a half tons of salt have been harvested. Gypsum can also be sourced from the salt works, as was done in a 2008 study of the mineral. Magnesium chloride is also produced during the solar salt operation and is sold for industrial use. In 2005, the salt works employed twenty-two people. In 2017, the salt works continued to produce about 80,000 pounds of salt per harvest.

Since 1999, the parcel containing the salt works has been owned by the San Diego Regional Airport Authority, leased to the South Bay Salt Works company. In 2015, the Airport Authority planned to sell the land to the San Diego Foundation, to mitigate the building of a substation by San Diego Gas & Electric. It is planned that, when the lease on the land ends, the buildings will be re-purposed similar to those on Cannery Row. One proposed use is to convert the salt works into an interpretive center for the United States Fish and Wildlife Service.

=== Wildlife ===
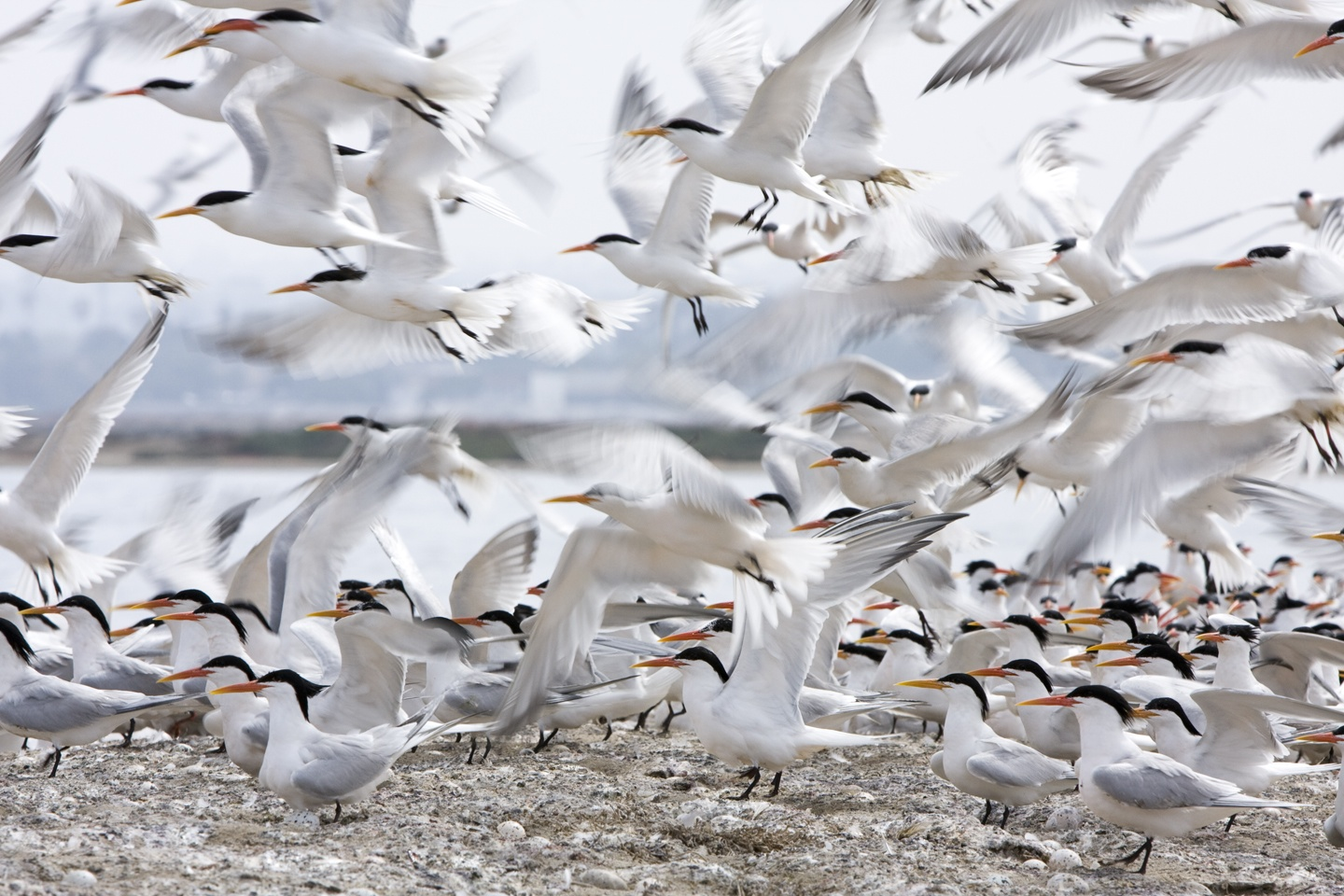
Elegant terns at the salt works in 2009

The salt ponds of the salt works fall within San Diego Bay National Wildlife Refuge. The salinity of the salt ponds creates an environment which breeds brine flies (Ephydridae) and brine shrimp (Artemia), a food source for the birds. During the winter months, there are monthly tours out into the salt ponds to observe migratory birds.

Ninety-four different species of birds reside in the area of the salt ponds, including migratory species; seven of the species are threatened or endangered. In 2010, over twenty thousand birds were counted at the salt ponds, including the endangered species California least tern (Sternula antillarum browni) and gull-billed tern (Gelochelidon nilotica vanrossemi).

In 2011, a nearly $8 million project restored two of the westernmost ponds to marshland. In 2013, a study of the hypersaline waters of the salt works showed that its microbial makeup differs substantially from those of a similar salt pond in Santa Pola, Spain. Due to the presence of these threatened and endangered species at the salt ponds, they were included in Port of San Diego's natural resources management plan, which was completed in September 2013.

== See also ==
- Guerrero Negro
- Leslie Salt
- San Francisco Bay Salt Ponds
