= Nickel Plate Trail =

Rail trail in Indiana, US

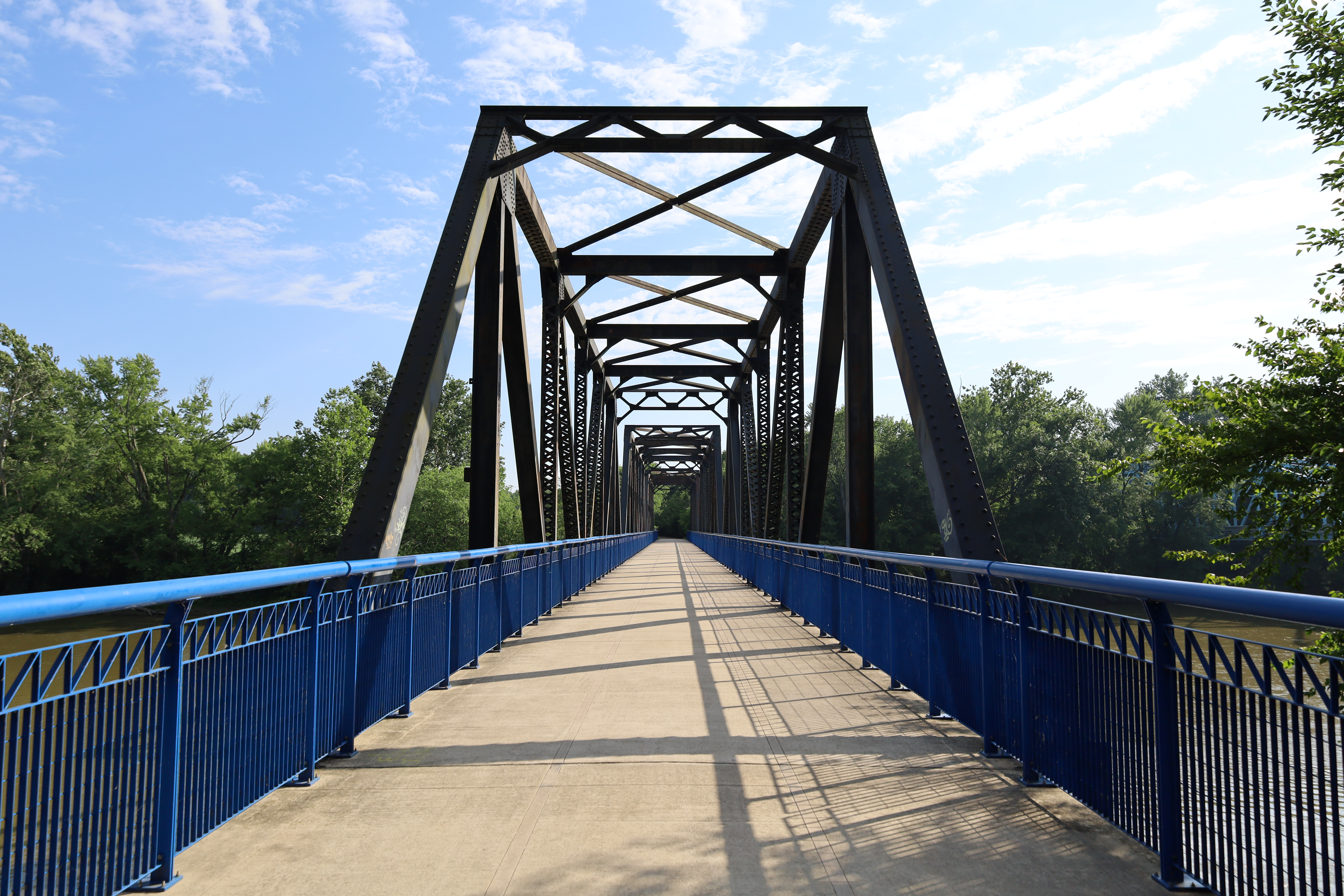
- The trail's Wabash River crossing in Peru, Indiana, in 2022
- Length: 56.3 miles (90.6 km)
- Location: Indiana
- Trailheads: Rochester; Kokomo; Noblesville; Indianapolis
- Use: Hiking, biking, rollerblading
- Season: Year round
- Surface: Asphalt
- Right of way: Nickel Plate Railroad
- Website: Nickel Plate Trail

The Nickel Plate Trail is a rail trail that currently encompasses 56.3 miles (90.6 km) of the abandoned Nickel Plate railroad corridor in north central and central Indiana. The longest section of trail runs from Rochester to Kokomo. Another section runs between Noblesville and the Indiana State Fairgrounds in Indianapolis.

== North-Central Indiana segment ==
=== Rochester to Peru ===
The northernmost point of the trail starts in Rochester in Fulton County, Indiana, before traveling south into Miami County through Macy, Deedsville, and Denver to just north of Peru. At this point, the trail stops within the city of Peru, before picking up on the southwest side of the city. This portion between Rochester and Peru extends for a total of 21.3 miles (34.3 km)

=== Peru to Kokomo ===
From Peru, the trail heads south through Bunker Hill and Miami in Miami County and through Cassville in Howard County, before connecting to the Industrial Heritage Trail in northern Kokomo, for a total of 17.5 miles (28.2 km). The two portions of the trail in north-central Indiana combined extend a total of 38.8 miles (62.4 km)

== Indianapolis/Hamilton County segment ==
=== Hamilton County segment ===
Starting at 3rd Street and Vine Street in downtown Noblesville, the Nickel Plate travels through Hamilton County, additionally passing through the downtown of the city of Fishers before reaching 96th Street, for a total of 8.4 miles (13.5 km) in Hamilton County.

=== Indianapolis segment ===
After crossing 96th Street, the Nickel Plate travels southwest until it connects into the Monon Trail at 42nd Street, immediately north of the Indiana State Fairgrounds. A short section of the trail near Interstate 465 is planned to open in 2026 due to construction work on the highway, and the city of Indianapolis plans to build pedestrian bridges over Keystone Avenue in 2026 and 82nd Street in 2028. The total cost of constructing the Indianapolis section of the Nickel Plate was $15 million.

== Future Plans ==
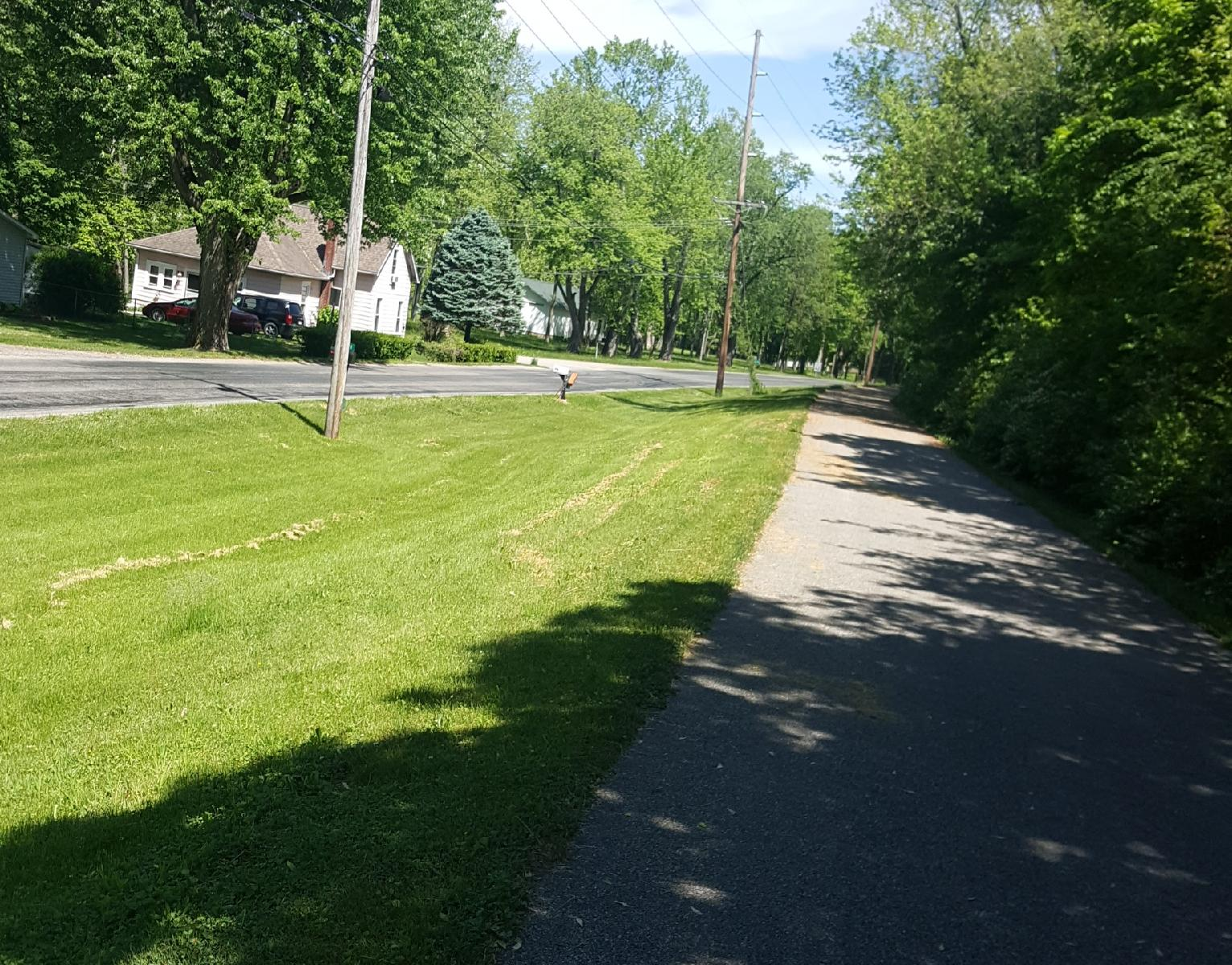
The Nickel Plate Trail near Peru, Indiana in 2018

Currently, the trail ends in Howard County, just north of the city of Kokomo. In 2018, the Industrial Heritage Trail in Kokomo was extended via a lighted pedestrian bridge over State Road 931 and under U.S. Route 31, effectively extending the trail to just south of Lincoln Road near State Road 931.

Other communities south of Kokomo have expressed interest in connecting to the Nickel Plate Trail. Recently, Tipton started work on a comprehensive plan with hopes of connecting to the Nickel Plate Trail. Should the Nickel Plate Trail connect to Tipton, the trail would then be near 60 miles (97 km) in length, the same length of the Cardinal Greenway, the current longest rail trail in Indiana. It would also connect Tipton, Sharpsville, and Oakford to Kokomo via an extension of the current Industrial Heritage Trail on the city's south side.

== See also ==
- American Discovery Trail
- Great American Rail-Trail
- List of cycleways in Indiana
- List of rail trails in the United States
- Transportation in Indianapolis
