= Whittemore Glen State Park =

State park in New Haven County, Connecticut

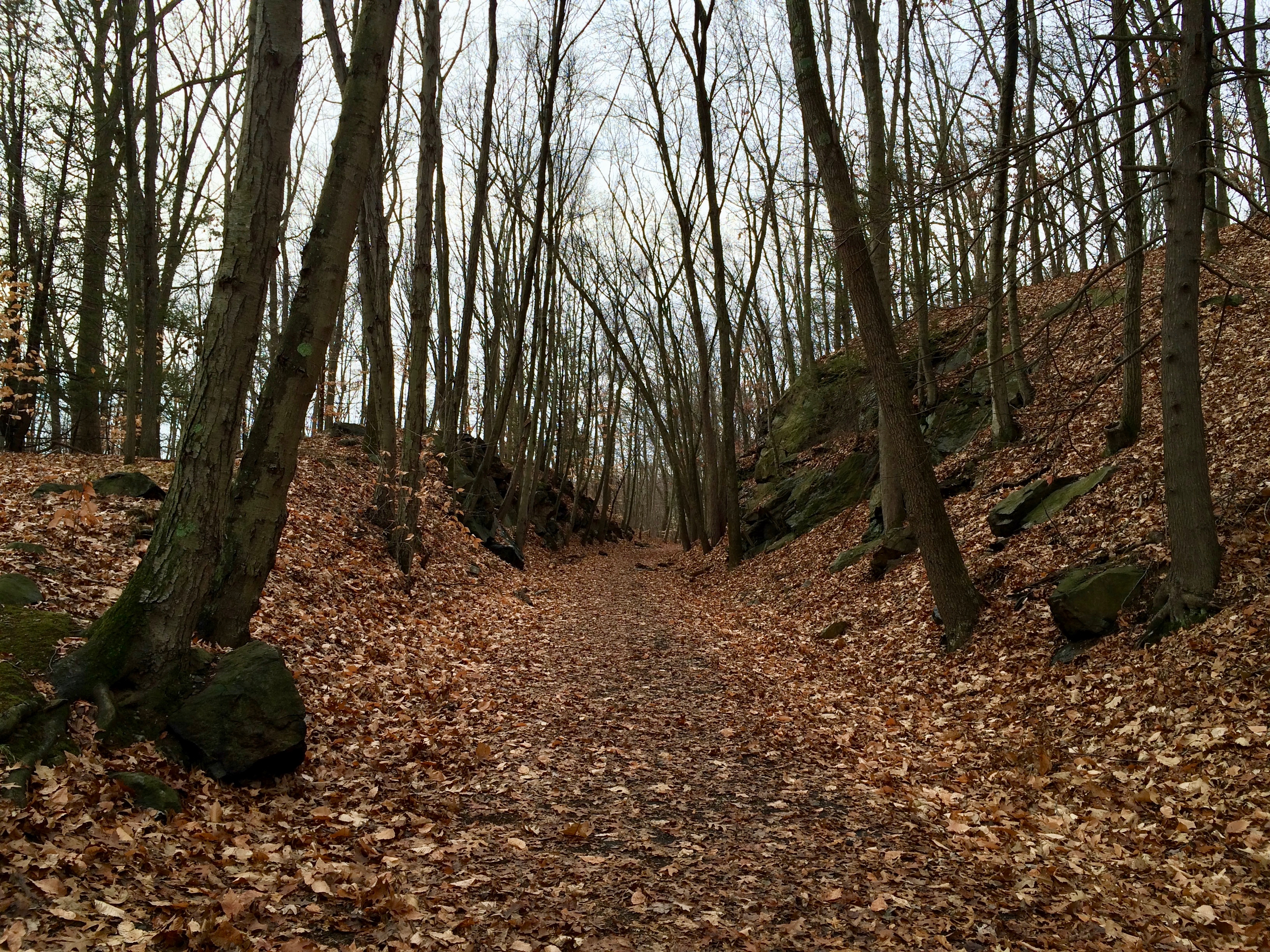
- Larkin Trail in Whittemore Glen State Park

- Location within Connecticut Location within the United States
- Location: Naugatuck, Connecticut, United States
- Nearest city: Waterbury, Connecticut
- Coordinates: 41°30′42″N 73°03′56″W
- Area: 242 acres (98 ha)
- Elevation: 351 ft (107 m)
- Established: 1945
- Administrator: Connecticut Department of Energy and Environmental Protection
- Designation: Connecticut state park
- Website: Official website

Whittemore Glen State Park is an undeveloped public recreation and wilderness area for hiking and horseback riding covering 242 acres (98 ha) mostly within the town of Naugatuck, Connecticut. Sitting outside the southwestern edge of the city of Waterbury, the state park is the eastern terminus of the Larkin State Park Trail. It entered the roles as Connecticut's forty-eighth state park in the 1945–46 edition of the Connecticut Register and Manual. The park is managed by the Connecticut Department of Energy and Environmental Protection.
