= Jiahou Line Bikeway =

Cycleway in Taichung, Taiwan

Jiahou Line Bikeway 甲后線自行車道
- Length: 35.2 km
- Location: Taichung, Taiwan
- Established: 15 July 2019
- Trailheads: Dajia District, Houli District
- Use: cycling

The Jiahou Line Bikeway (traditional Chinese: 甲后線自行車道; simplified Chinese: 甲后线自行车道; pinyin: Jiǎhòu Xiàn Zìxíngchē Dào) is a cycleway in Taichung, Taiwan.

== History ==
The cycleway was inaugurated on 15 July 2019 by the Tourism Office of Taichung City Government at Ciyao Levee of Waipu Lotus Valley. The ceremony was attended by Taichung Deputy Mayor and legislators from Taichung City Council.

== Architecture ==
The cycleway spans over a total length of 35.2 km, divided into the main line which stretches for 16.97 km called Jiajou Line and branch lines named Liufen Road (5.63 km) and Lotus Valley (12.6 km). It connects Dajia District and Houli District in the city, with its branch connects with Waipu District.

== Finance ==
The total construction cost of the cycleway was NT$24.58 million. Sports Administration subsidized 60% of the cycleway construction cost.

== Facilities ==
The cycleway features two observation decks located at Ciyao Levee.

== See also ==
- List of cycleways
- Taiwan Cycling Route No.1
