= John W. Christian Greenbelt =

Coordinates: 37.399°N 122.022°W

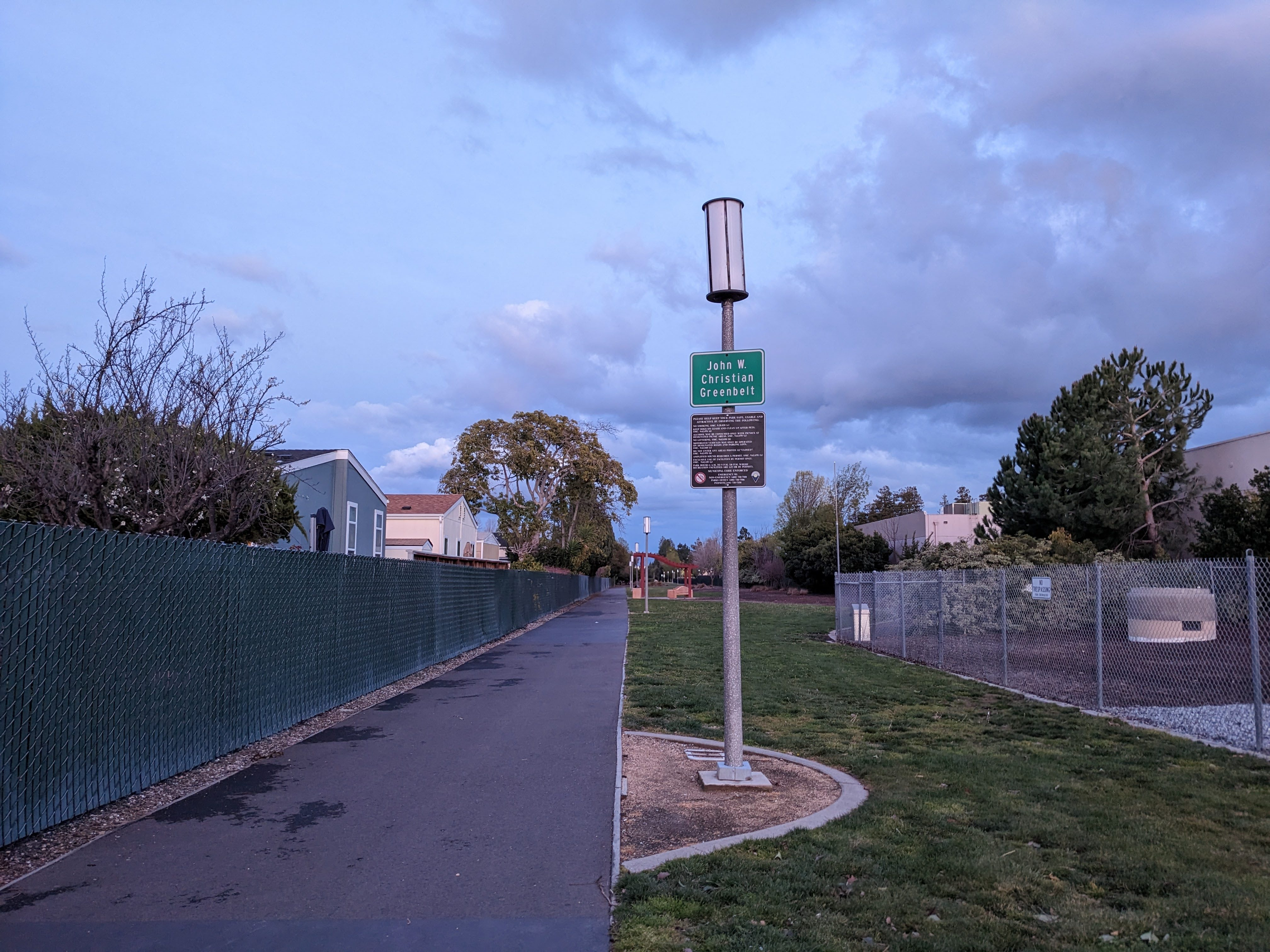
- Length: 2.7 miles (4.3 km)
- Location: Sunnyvale, CA
- Established: mid-1970s
- Trailheads: Orchard Gardens Park, Fairwood Park

The John W. Christian Greenbelt is a stretch of green land in northern Sunnyvale, California.

== Location ==
It is 80 feet (24 m) wide and runs east to west for 2.7 miles (4.3 km) above the Hetch Hetchy Aqueduct, linking Orchard Gardens Park on Sunnyvale's west side and Fairwood Park, located on the Sunnyvale-Santa Clara border.

== History ==
It was created under the name Hetch Hetchy Greenbelt in the mid-1970s as an asphalt track for pedestrians and bicycles, and part of it was improved by a landscape beautification project. Between 1994 and 2001 the landscaping was completed.

== Renaming ==
On June 10, 2002, it was renamed after John W. Christian, who initiated the second phase of the landscaping as Parks and Recreation Director, but died in 1996 before it was finished. The land is owned by the San Francisco Public Utilities Commission, leased out to the city of Sunnyvale.
