= Larkin State Park Trail =

Rail trail in Connecticut, United States

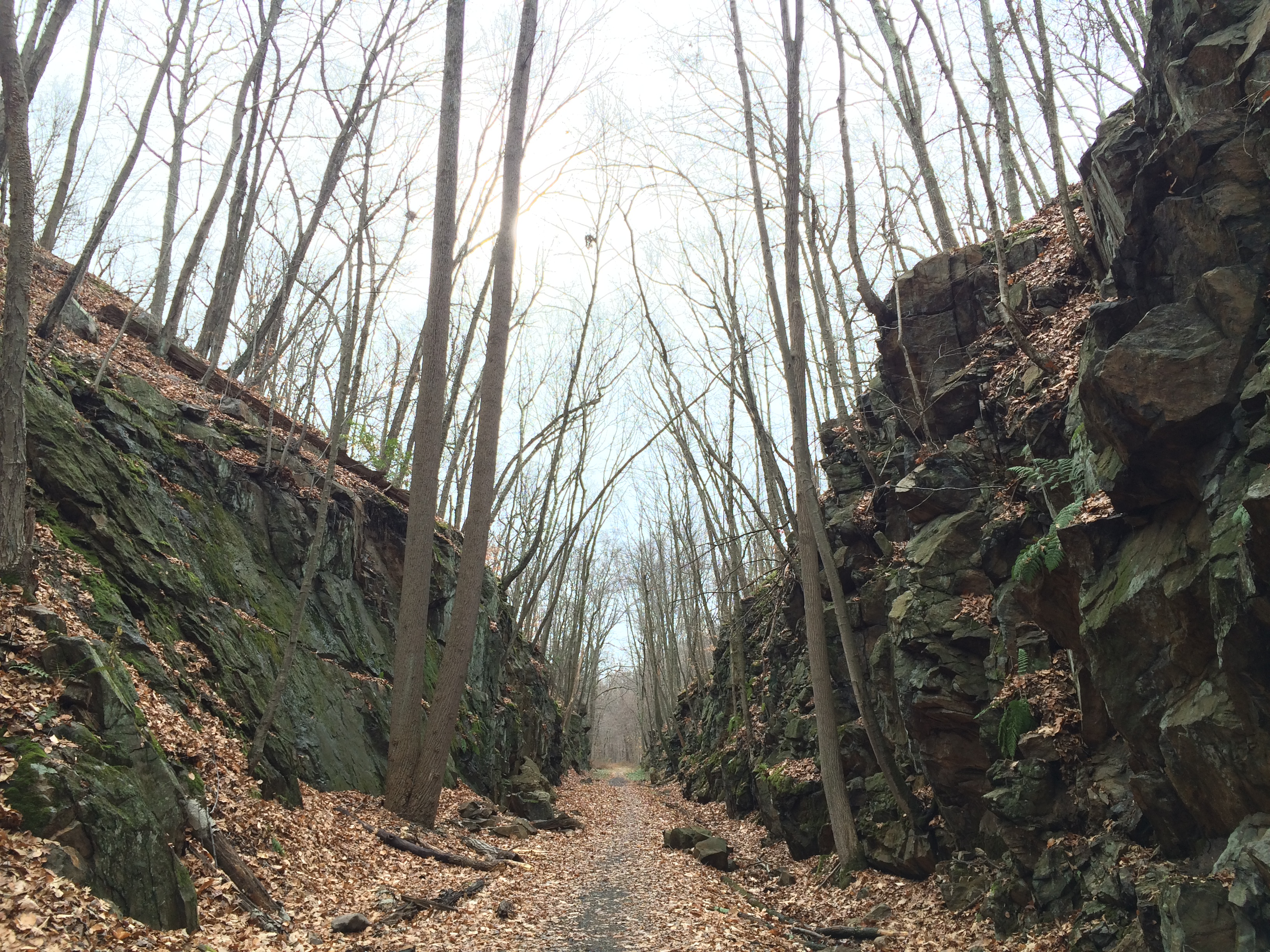
- Looking west on the trail in Middlebury
- Length: 10.3 miles (16.6 km)
- Location: Southbury, Oxford, Middlebury, and Naugatuck, Connecticut
- Established: 1943
- Designation: Connecticut state park
- Trailheads: Southbury (41°28′20″N 73°12′25″W); Naugatuck (41°30′45″N 73°03′56″W)
- Use: Hiking, biking, horseback riding, cross-country skiing
- Sights: Woodlands, horse farms, ponds, wetlands
- Surface: Various: sand, packed dirt and cobbles, railroad ballast and cinders
- Maintained by: Connecticut Department of Energy and Environmental Protection
- Website: Larkin State Park Trail

Trail map
- Location of trailheads in Connecticut

Larkin State Park Trail is a Connecticut rail trail that follows the former New York & New England Railroad roadbed across the towns of Southbury, Oxford, Middlebury, and Naugatuck. The trail is 10.3 miles (16.6 km) long; its eastern terminus is at Whittemore Glen State Park, the western at Kettletown Road in Southbury. The trail is open for hiking, biking, horseback riding, and cross-country skiing.

== History ==
The rail line was in operation from 1881 until 1939. Four years after the line's abandonment, Dr. Charles L. Larkin bought a ten-mile section that he donated to the state for the purpose of creating an equestrian trail. The park was named in his honor.
