= Power Line Trail =

Multi-use trail in Horsham Township, Pennsylvania

Coordinates: 40.1878°N 75.1625°W

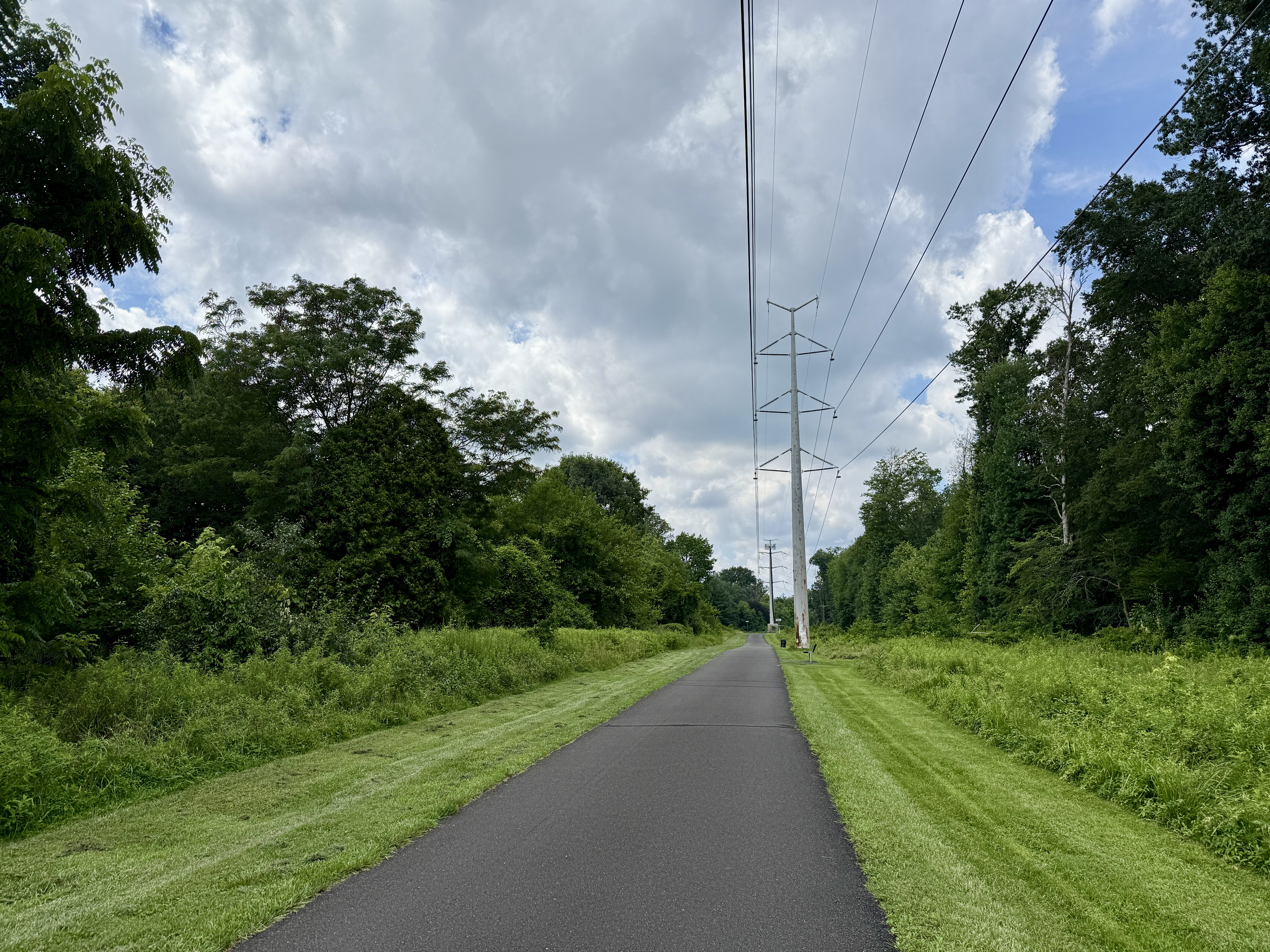
- Power Line Trail east of Norristown Road
- Length: 5.24 mi (8.43 km)
- Trailheads: Horsham, Pennsylvania
- Use: Multi-use, non-motorized
- Season: Year-round, no winter maintenance
- Surface: Paved

The Power Line Trail is a multi-use trail located in Horsham Township, Montgomery County, Pennsylvania. It follows a PECO Energy right-of-way through the township.

== History and features ==
In 2007, PECO Energy provided a $10,000 grant to Horsham Township to pay for half of the estimated $20,000 cost to build two trails that would connect the Power Line Trail to the township's Simmons Elementary School and to Horsham Township Library.

The Power Line Trail, which currently consists of six segments that, combined, equal a total length of 5.24 miles (8.43 km), links multiple parks and other points of interest in Horsham Township including Cedar Hill Road Park, Kohler Park, the Horsham Township Building, the LoHo neighborhood, Deep Meadow Park, Hatboro-Horsham High School, Simmons Elementary, the Horsham Township Library, the Jarrett Nature Center, Jarrett Road Park, and Lukens Park.

The trail is planned to extend west into Montgomery and Upper Gwynedd townships to connect to the US 202 Parkway Trail and east into Upper Moreland Township to connect to the Pennypack Trail and Cross County Trail.

Trail Segment	Distance
Blair Mill Road to Dresher Road	0.73 miles (1.17 km)
Dresher Road to Norristown Road	1.39 miles (2.24 km)
Norristown Road to Babylon Road	1.25 miles (2.01 km)
Babylon Road to Limekiln Pike (Pennsylvania Route 152)	0.75 miles (1.21 km)
Limekiln Pike to Cedar Hill Road	0.89 miles (1.43 km)
Cedar Hill Road to Biwood Road	0.23 miles (0.37 km)
