= Cross County Trail =

Multi-use trail in Montgomery County, Pennsylvania

- Length: 3.0 mi (4.8 km)
- Trailheads: Plymouth Township, Pennsylvania
- Use: Multi-use, non-motorized
- Season: Variable, depending on latitude
- Surface: Paved

The Cross County Trail is a multi-use trail located in Montgomery County, Pennsylvania. As of July 2023, eight of the nineteen proposed segments of the trail are complete. The trail starts at its junction with the Schuylkill River Trail and runs north to one of its current termini at Germantown Pike for a length of 3.24 miles (5.21 km). The trail is planned to extend east for an additional 3.28 miles (5.28 km) to connect to the Wissahickon Trail at Stenton Avenue and West Valley Green Road. The trail will then start again further north on the Wissahickon Trail in Fort Washington State Park, and briefly follow the Wissahickon Creek before turning northeast towards Fort Washington. Once complete, the trail will connect to the Pennypack Trail, Power Line Trail, Wissahickon Trail, and the Schuylkill River Trail.
