= Silver Strand bikeway =

Bike path in San Diego County, California, USA

Silver Strand bikeway 9-mile (14 km) bicycle and pedestrian path in San Diego County, California. it is part of the larger Bayshore Bikeway which begins at the USS Midway Museum. The bikeway travels from Ferry Landing Marketplace to Imperial Beach at sea level with no elevation gain, providing a relatively easy ride. An entry point and parking area is located at Ferry Landing Marketplace.

== Description ==
The bikeway path travels from Ferry Landing Marketplace to Glorietta Boulevard to Silver Strand bikeway. It ends at Imperial Beach on Orange Avenue or at the wetlands and is approximately 9 miles (14 km) long.

=== Route ===
It was built along the former right of way of the Coronado Beltline Railroad.

== Ownership ==
Bike path quality in the City of San Diego is coordinated by SANDAG (San Diego Association of Governments).

== See also ==
- List of San Diego bike paths - includes information about class I, II, and III bike paths
- List of Los Angeles bike paths
