= Cassville, Indiana =

- Unincorporated community and Census-designated place
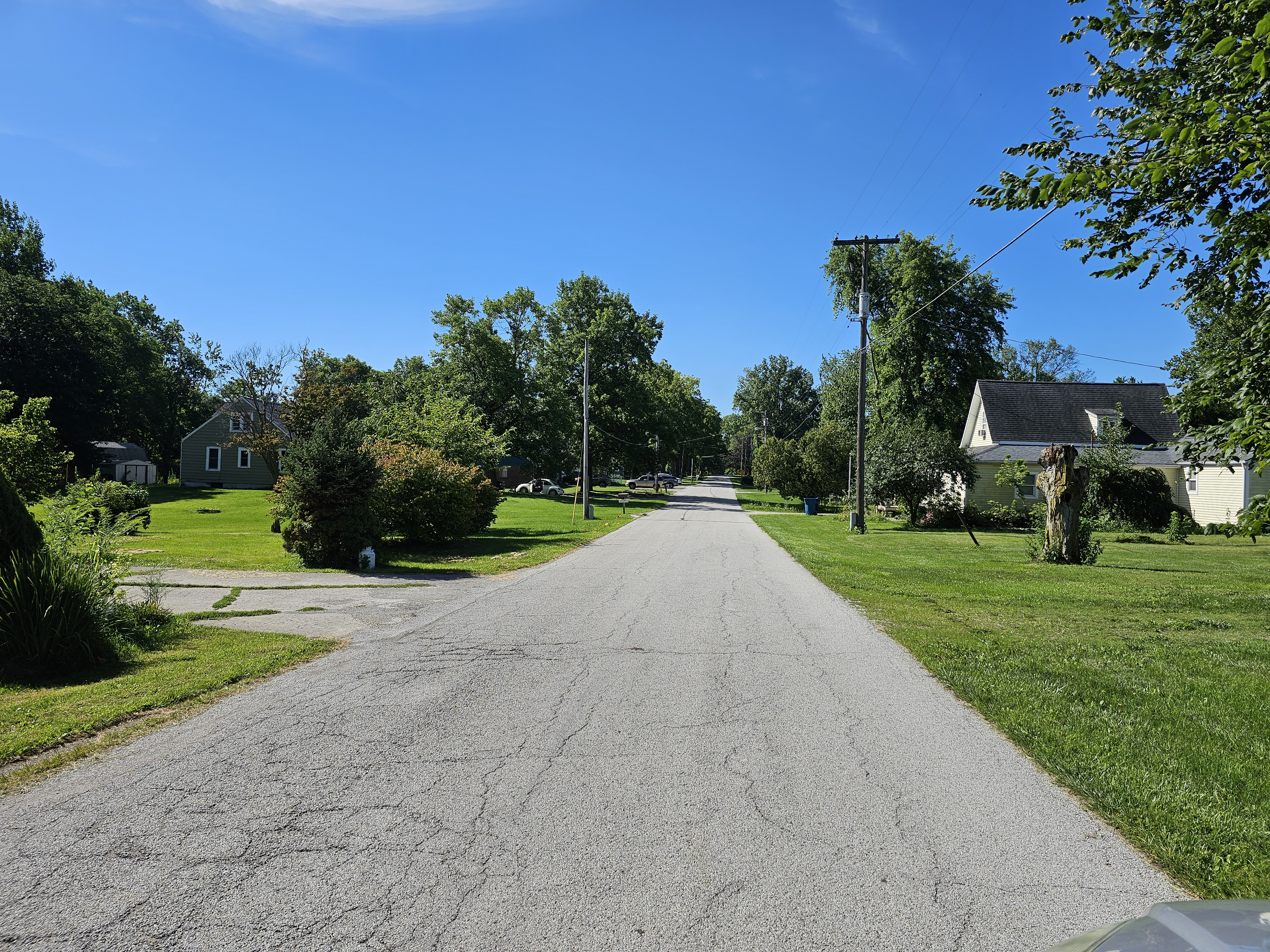

- Location within Indiana Location within the United States
- Coordinates: 40°33′22″N 86°07′32″W
- Country: United States
- State: Indiana
- County: Howard
- Township: Howard
- Elevation: 820 ft (250 m)
- ZIP code: 46901
- FIPS code: 18-10828
- GNIS feature ID: 2830411

Cassville is an unincorporated community in Howard Township, Howard County, Indiana, United States. It is part of the Kokomo, Indiana Metropolitan Statistical Area and located approximately 5.9 miles from downtown Kokomo.

== History ==
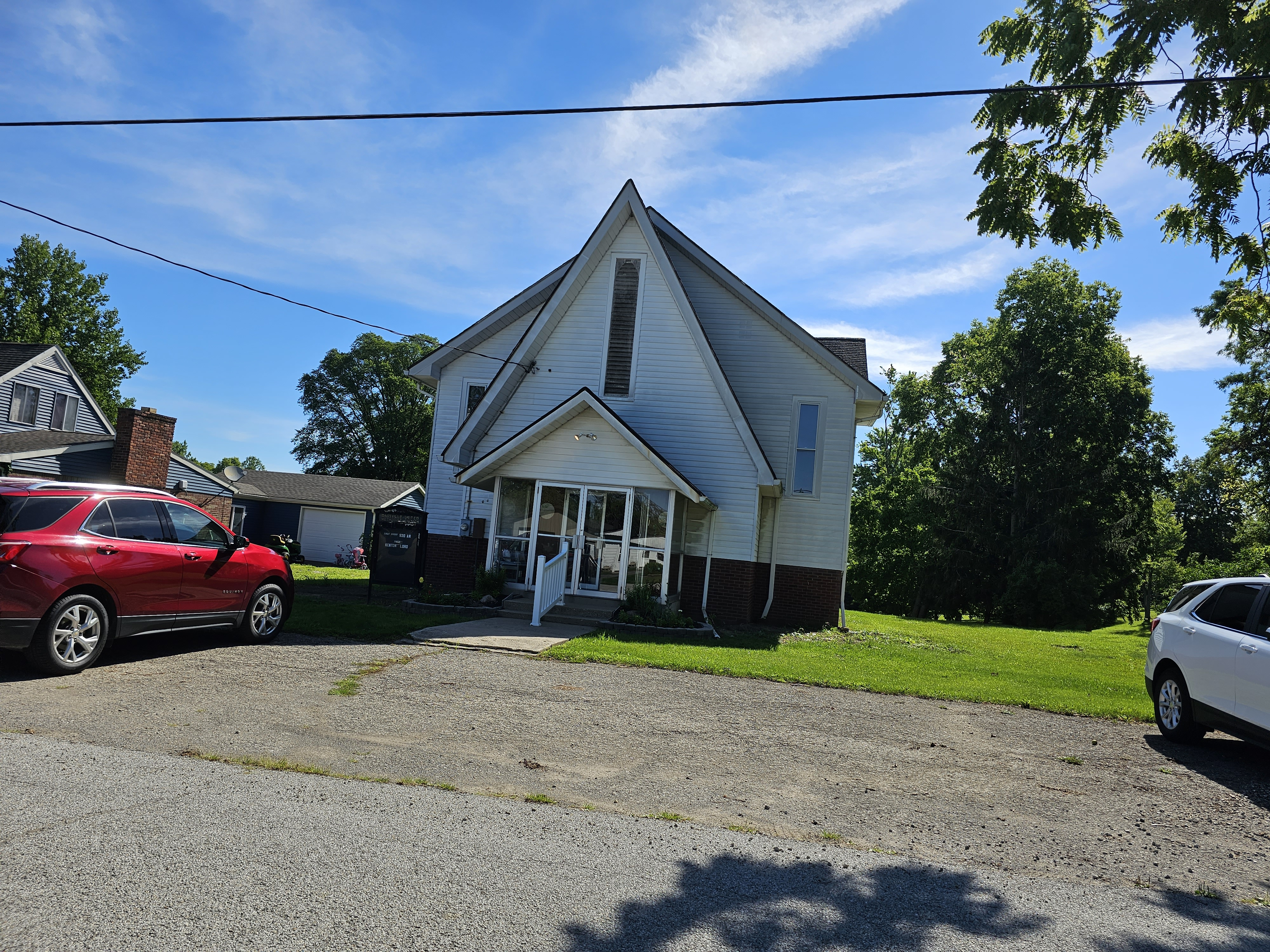
Cassville United Methodist Church

Originally named Pleasant Spring, Cassville was renamed in 1854 for Lewis Cass, a U.S. Senator from Michigan.

== Demographics ==
The United States Census Bureau delineated Cassville as a census designated place in the 2022 American Community Survey.

== Geography ==
Cassville is located on the border of Clay Township and Howard Township.

=== Highway ===
- US-31 to South Bend (North) and Indianapolis (South)
