= EV6 The Rivers Route =

Cycling route in Europe

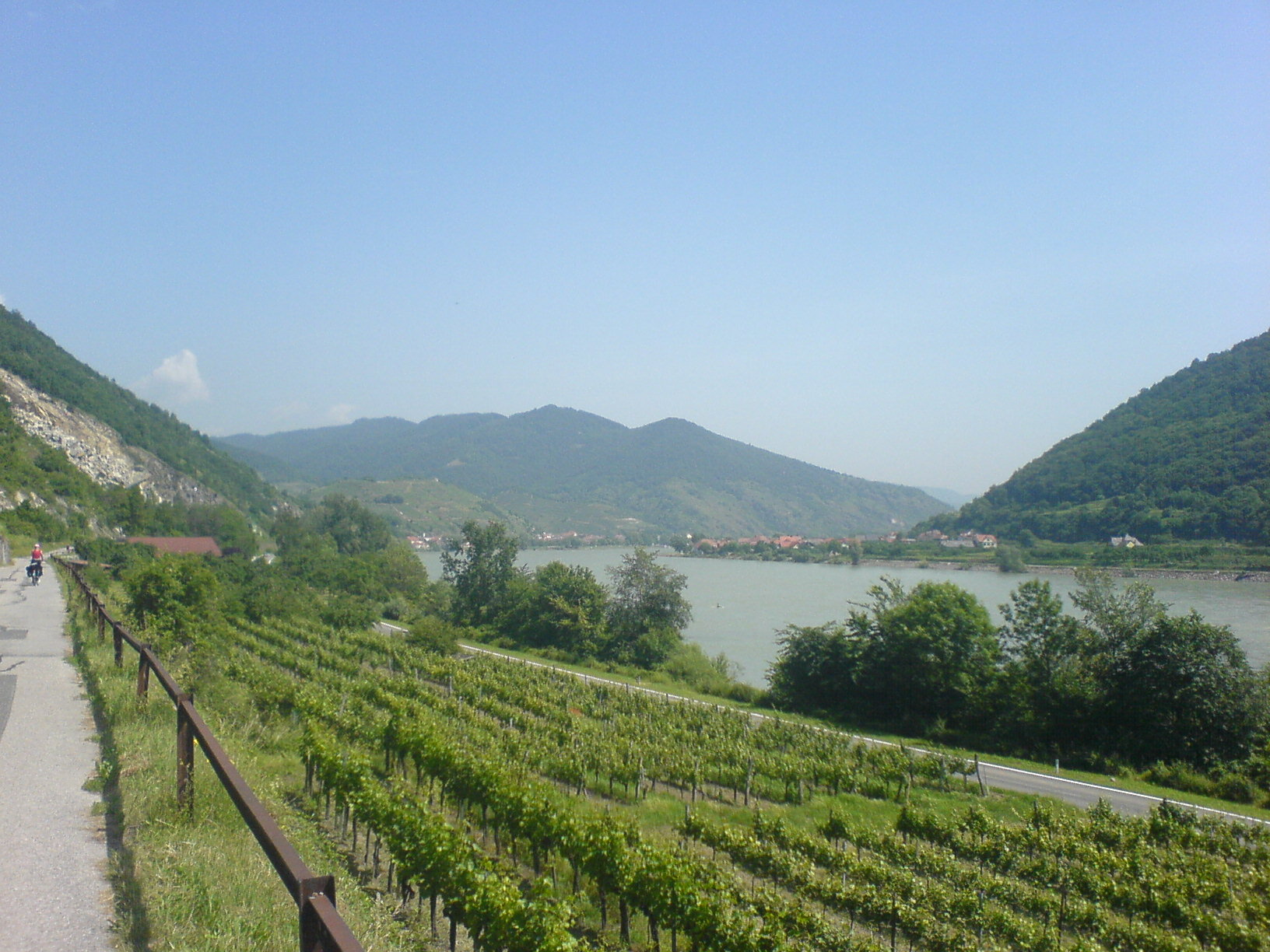
- Length: 3,653 km (2,270 mi)
- Designation: European Cyclists' Federation
- Trailheads: Nantes, France to Constanța, Romania
- Use: cycling
- Website: en.eurovelo.com/ev6

Trail map
- Map of the EuroVelo 6 long-distance cycling route, from the Atlantic coast to the Black Sea.

EuroVelo 6 (EV6), named the "Rivers Route", is a EuroVelo long-distance cycling route that runs along some of Europe's major rivers for 3,653 km (2,270 mi), including much of the Loire, some of the Saône, a short section of the upper Rhine and almost the entire length of Europe’s second longest river, the Danube — from the Atlantic coast of France to the city of Constanța on the Black Sea.

The EV6 traverses ten countries, from the mouth of the Loire eastward along that river to the Saône, across the border to Switzerland, along the Rhine to Lake Constance, north into Germany, down the Danube and through Austria, Slovakia, Hungary, Serbia, Croatia, Bulgaria, and Romania to the Danube Delta, before terminating at Constanța on the Black Sea.

The EV6 includes the Danube Cycleway (de:Donauradweg), the most popular holiday cycle route in Europe. This section stretches from Donaueschingen to Passau in Germany, through Austria to Vienna, and continues on to Bratislava in Slovakia, to Novi Sad and Belgrade in Serbia, before continuing on towards the Danube Delta.

== Route ==
=== Loire ===
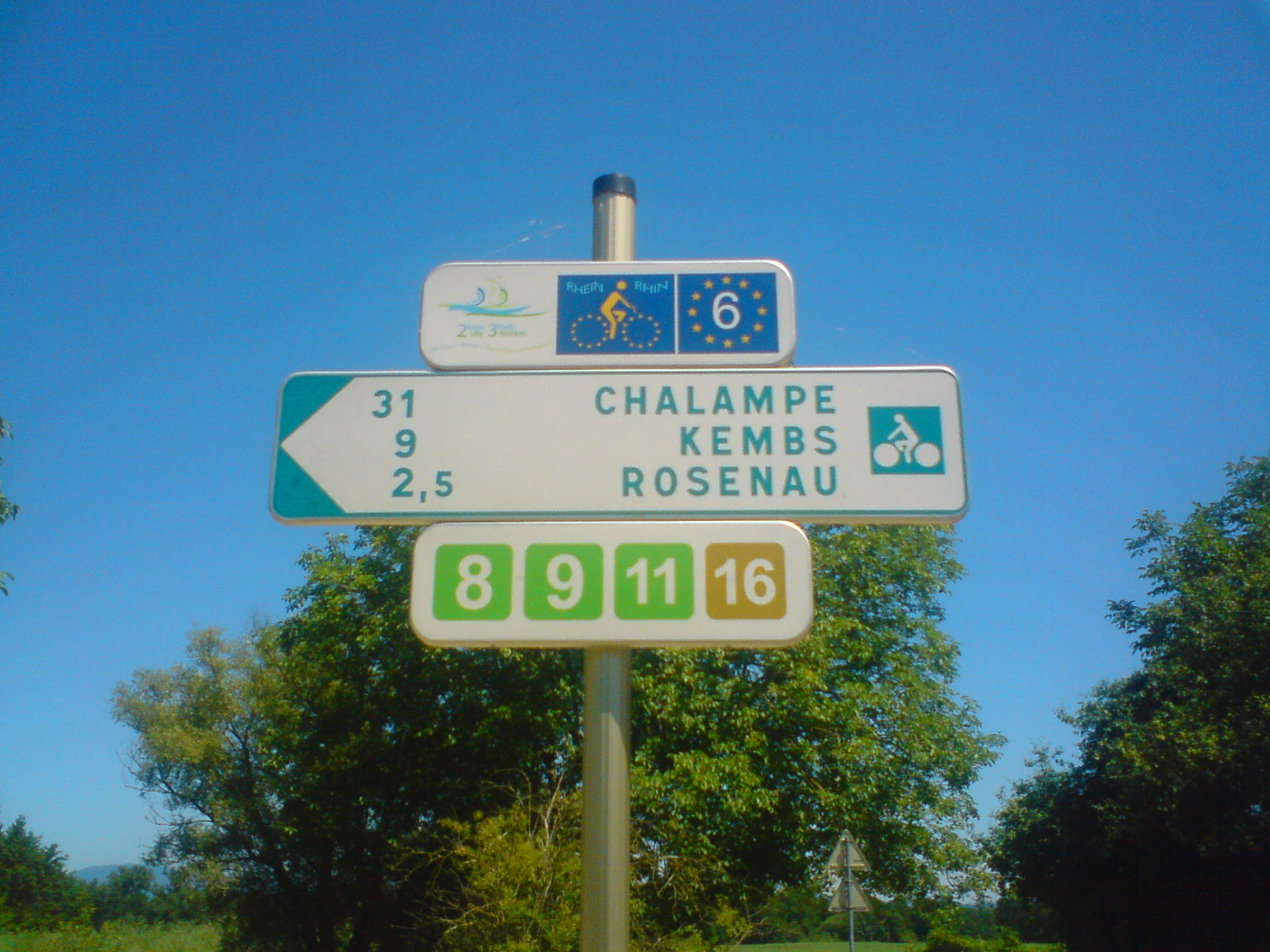
EuroVelo 6 route sign at Saint-Louis France, near both the Swiss city of Basel and the German border.

The EV6 runs from Saint-Brevin-les-Pins, at the mouth of the Loire on the Atlantic coast of France, to Nantes, Tours, Blois and travels along the river eastward to Orléans and Nevers before leaving the Loire at Digoin for the Canal du Centre. This section of the EV6 encompasses the French bike route La Loire à vélo.

=== Loire to Basel ===
From the Loire, the EV6 follows the Canal du Centre to the river Saône at Chalon-sur-Saône. It continues through Burgundian wine country to Besançon, Baume-les-Dames, Montbéliard, and Mulhouse. It then crosses into Switzerland at Basel, following the Rhine valley to Lake Constance before crossing into Germany.

=== Danube ===
From Tuttlingen in Germany, the EV6 follows the Danube Cycleway all the way to the Black Sea. It mostly runs along both sides of the Danube, which flows through diverse landscapes, including mountainous terrain, plains, and nature reserves as it passes through Germany, Austria, Slovakia, Hungary, Croatia, Serbia, Romania, and Bulgaria.

In the local languages along the way the EV6's Danube Cycleway is known as:

- German: Donauradweg
- Croatian: Dunavska biciklistička ruta
- Slovak: Dunajská cyklistická cesta
- Hungarian: Duna menti kerékpárút
- Serbian: Дунавска бициклистичка рута
- Bulgarian: Дунавски велосипеден път

=== Germany ===
From Lake Constance, the EV6 follows a route known as the "Hohenzollern Route" to Donaueschingen, where it joins the Danube Cycleway, the German Cycling Network's D6 or "Donauradweg".

The EV6 route passes through two German states, Baden-Württemberg and Bavaria, taking the following route:

- In Baden-Württemberg:
  - Hohenzollern Route: Lake Constance ↔ Messkirch ↔ Tuttlingen
  - Danube Cycleway: Tuttlingen ↔ Beuron ↔ Sigmaringen ↔ Scheer ↔ Riedlingen ↔ Obermarchtal ↔ Ehingen ↔ Ulm
- In Bavaria:
  - Danube Cycleway: Neu-Ulm ↔ Oberelchingen ↔ Leipheim ↔ Günzburg ↔ Offingen ↔ Gundelfingen an der Donau ↔ Lauingen (Donau) ↔ Dillingen an der Donau ↔ Höchstädt an der Donau ↔ Donauwörth ↔ Marxheim ↔ Bertoldsheim ↔ Neuburg an der Donau ↔ Ingolstadt ↔ Neustadt an der Donau ↔ Kloster Weltenburg ↔ Kelheim ↔ Bad Abbach ↔ Regensburg ↔ Donaustauf ↔ Wörth an der Donau ↔ Kössnach ↔ Straubing ↔ Bogen ↔ Mariaposching ↔ Metten ↔ Deggendorf ↔ Niederalteich ↔ Osterhofen ↔ Pleinting ↔ Vilshofen ↔ Windorf ↔ Gaishofen ↔ Passau ↔ Obernzell

The EV6 / Danube Cycleway follows the rail corridor of the Danube Valley Railway for long stretches. The section in the upper Danube valley, which runs between the towns Mühlheim an der Donau and Scheer, is the heart of the Upper Danube Nature Park and borders on a great number of chalk cliffs as well as numerous mountains, castles, ruins, monasteries and Baroque churches, including:

- Schloss der Herren von Enzberg in Mühlheim
- Burgruine Kallenberg
- Schloss Bronnen
- Knopfmacherfelsen
- Benediktinerkloster Beuron
- Petershöhle
- Benediktushöhle
- Burg Wildenstein
- Schloss Werenwag
- Burgruine Falkenstein
- Ruine Dietfurt
- Burgruine Neugutenstein
- Amalienfelsen
- Hohenzollernschloss Sigmaringen
- Schloss Scheer
- Schloss Bartelstein
- Barockkirche des Residenzstädtchens Scheer

From Scheer, the Danube leaves the Swabian alps and so the EV6 runs through the wide plains of the upper Swabian Danube valley. The route heads towards Ulm via Riedlingen, Obermarchtal and Ehingen, then leaves Baden-Württemberg and enters Bavaria. The route goes to Passau via Höchstädt, Donauwörth, Ingolstadt, the Weltenburg monastery, Kelheim, Regensburg, Straubing, Plattling and Vilshofen an der Donau. From Passau both the Danube and the route cross the border into Austria. After Obernzell a ferry offers the possibility to combine the border crossing with the river crossing.

=== Austria ===
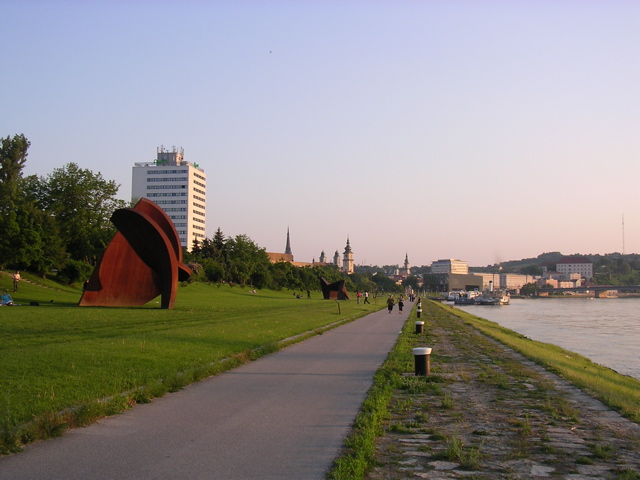
Rivers Route cycling path running along the Danube in Linz.

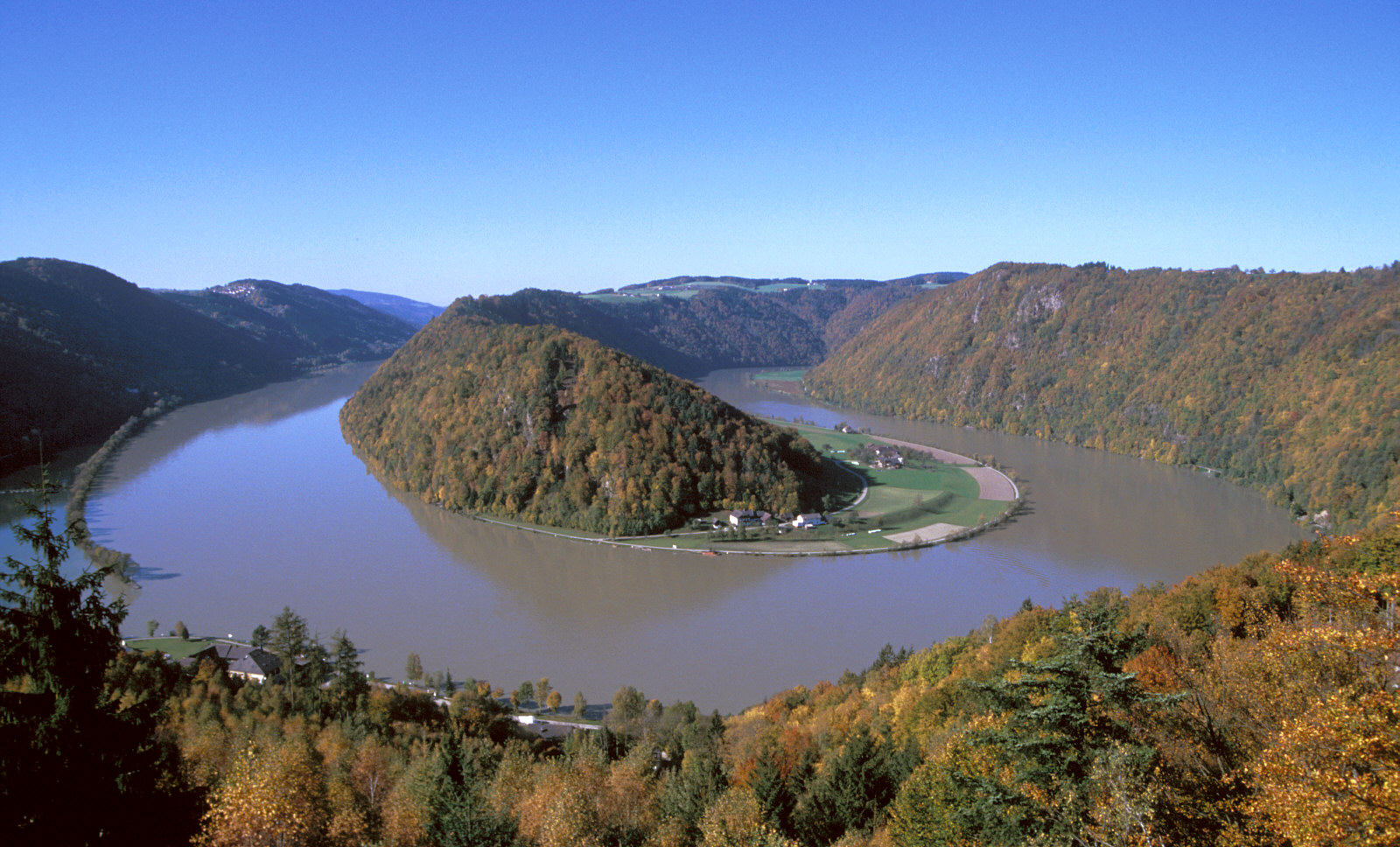
The Donauschlinge, an oxbow on the Danube in Austria

The northern Austrian section runs alongside the R1 Danube route and the southern Austrian section follows the R6 Danube route. In this section, there are paved paths for all but 100 meters on both the north and south banks, with bridges, ferries, and some dams linking the two banks.

After the Lake Constance Route, the part from Passau to Vienna is the second-most traveled bicycle route in Europe. The ADFC, which also analyses the traffic in the Austrian section since 2010, says that there was an increase compared to previous years.

=== Vienna to Budapest ===
Part III begins in Vienna goes through Bratislava in Slovakia and continues 306 km (190 mi) to Budapest.

=== Budapest to the Black Sea ===
Part IV of the path begins in Budapest and continues 1,670 km (1,040 mi) to the Black Sea in Romania. In this section it passes through Hungary, Serbia, Bulgaria (where it passes the UNESCO Heritage site Srebarna Nature Reserve) then into Romania to the UNESCO Heritage site of the Danube Delta, before following the Black Sea coast to end at Constanța in Romania.

While the EV6 is signposted in Serbia, signposts are lacking in much of the route through Bulgaria and Romania.

== Gallery ==
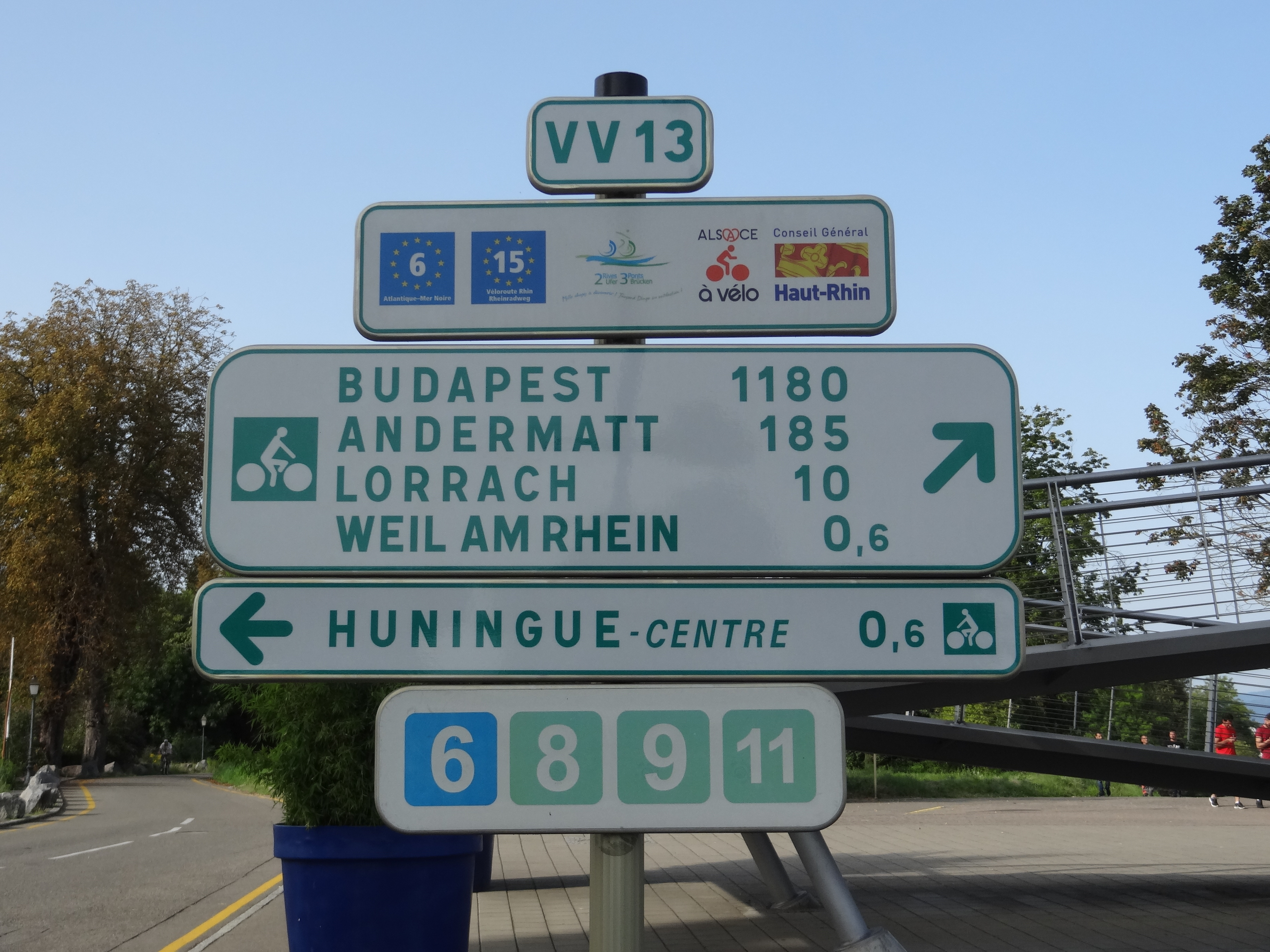
Route sign of EV6 and EV15 in Huningue, France.

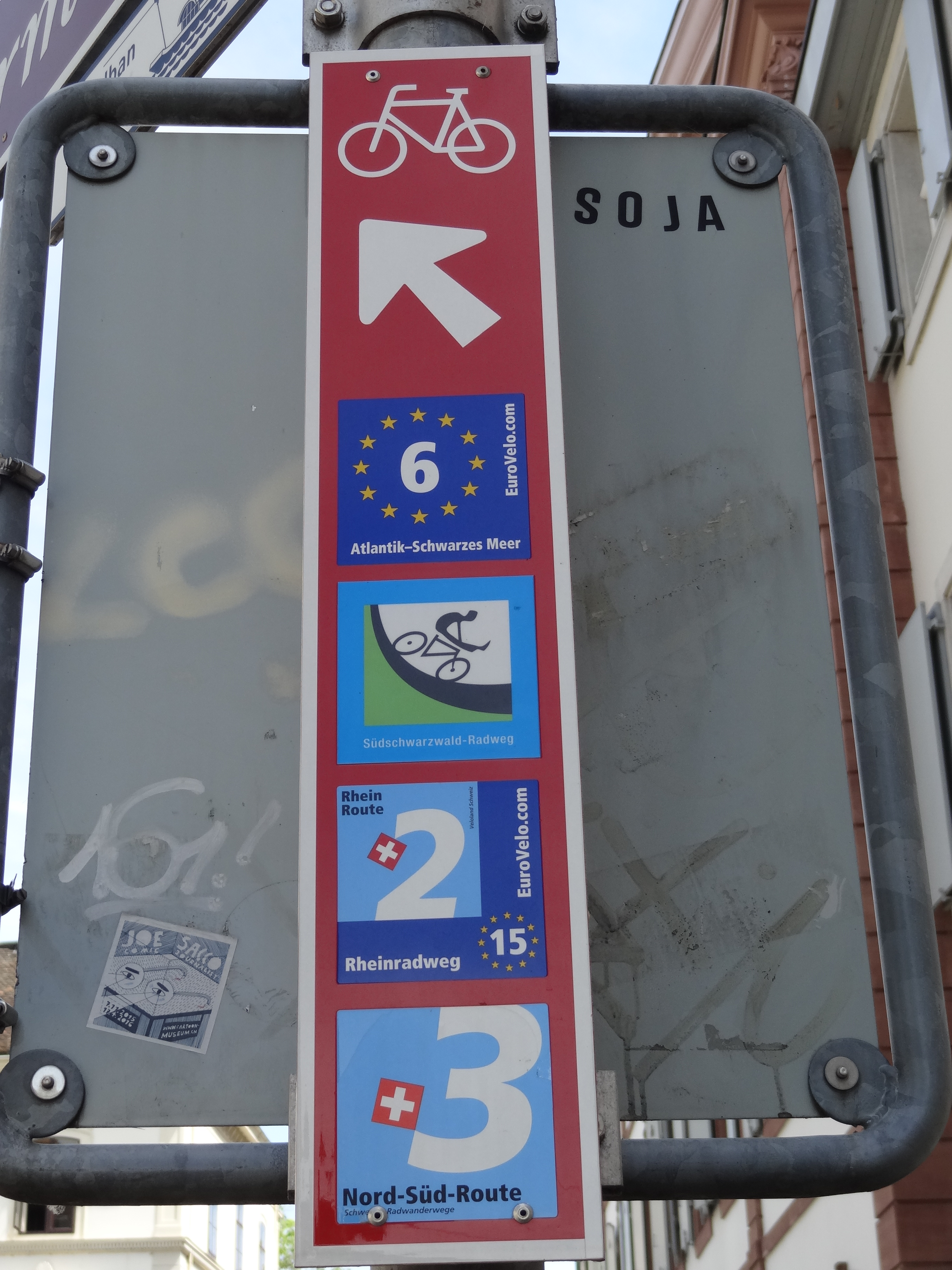
Route signs of EV6 and EV15 in Basel, Switzerland.

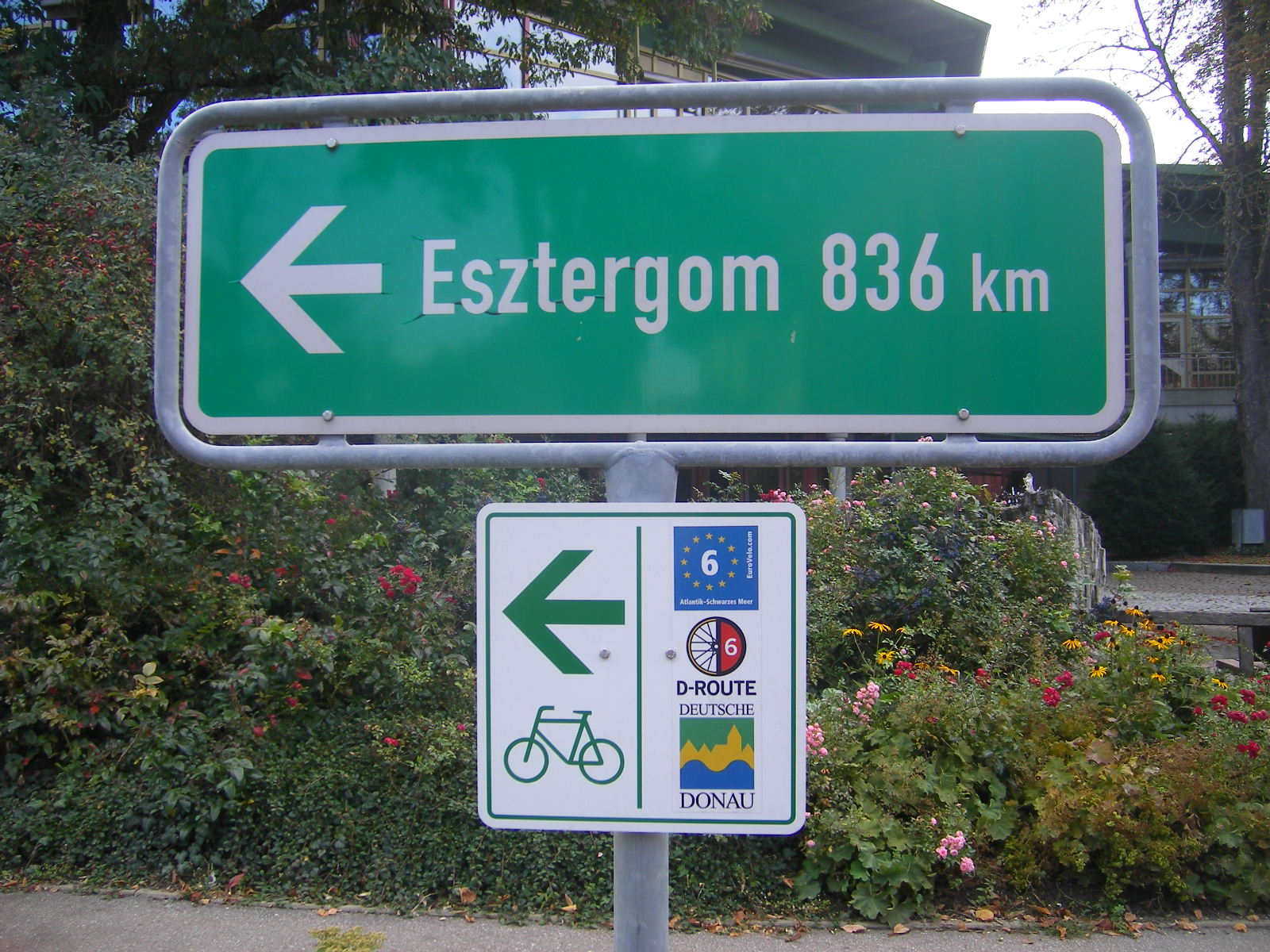
Route sign in Ehingen, Germany.

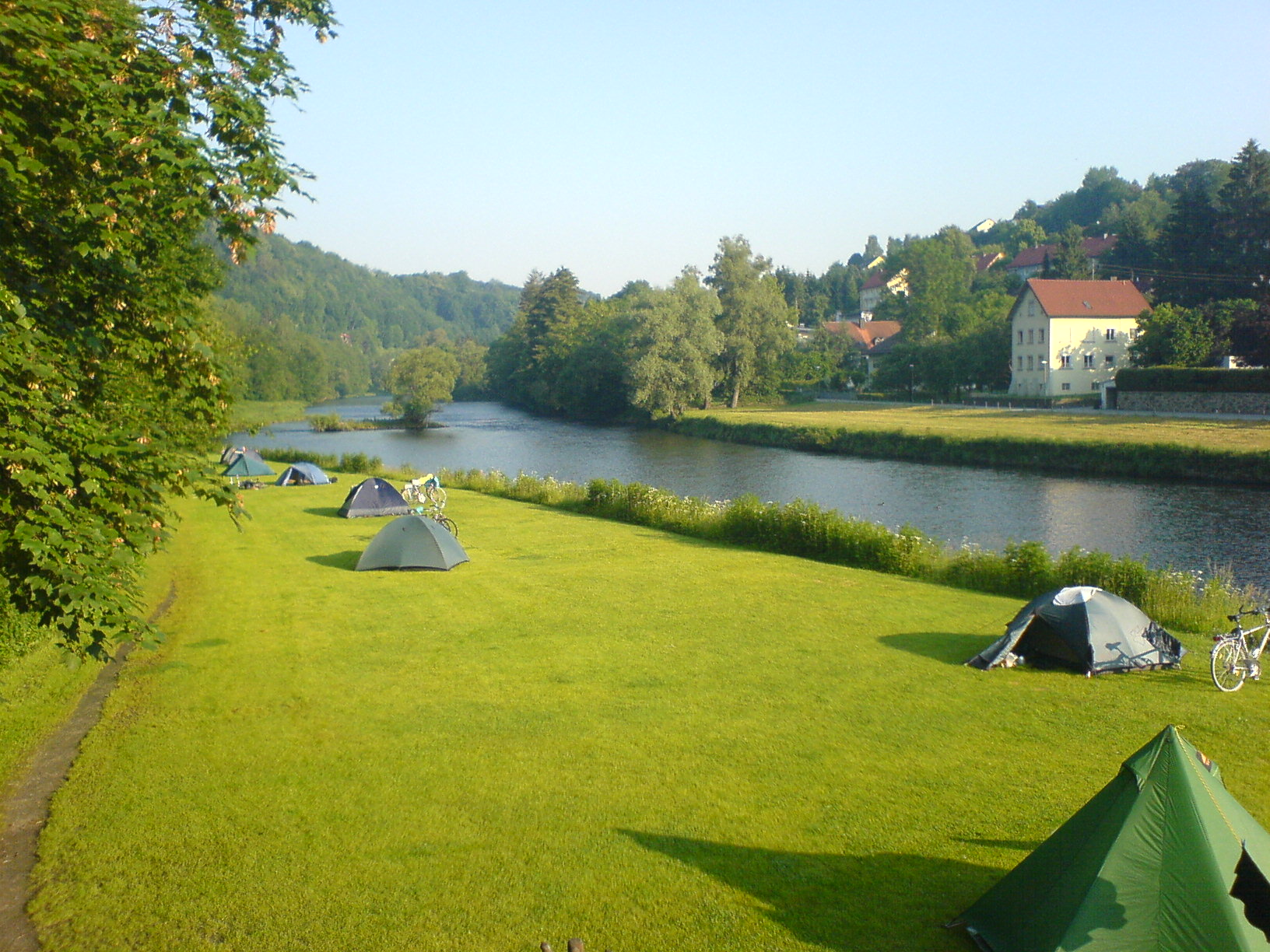
Camp site in Passau, Germany.

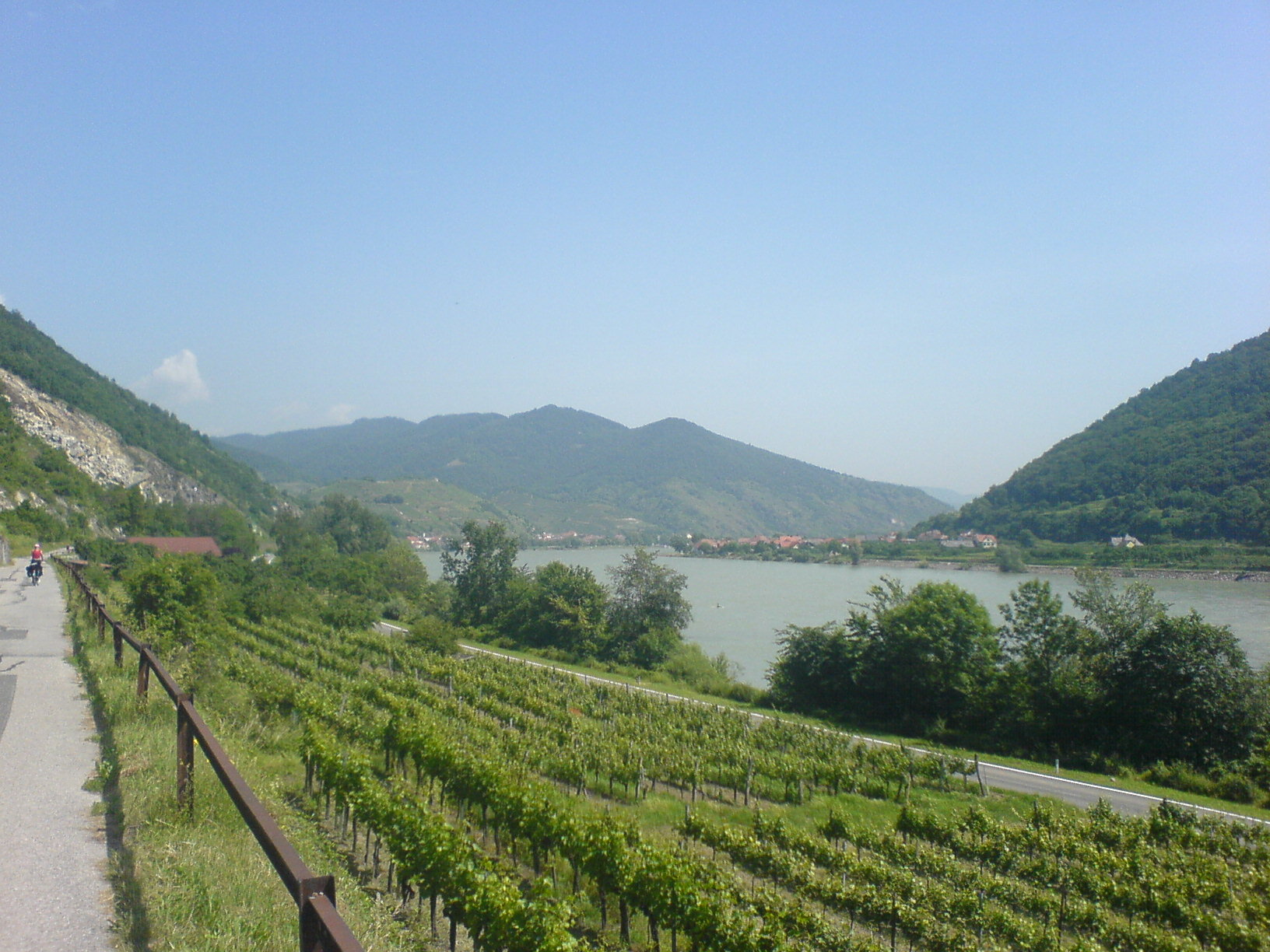
Danube cycle path in eastern Austria.

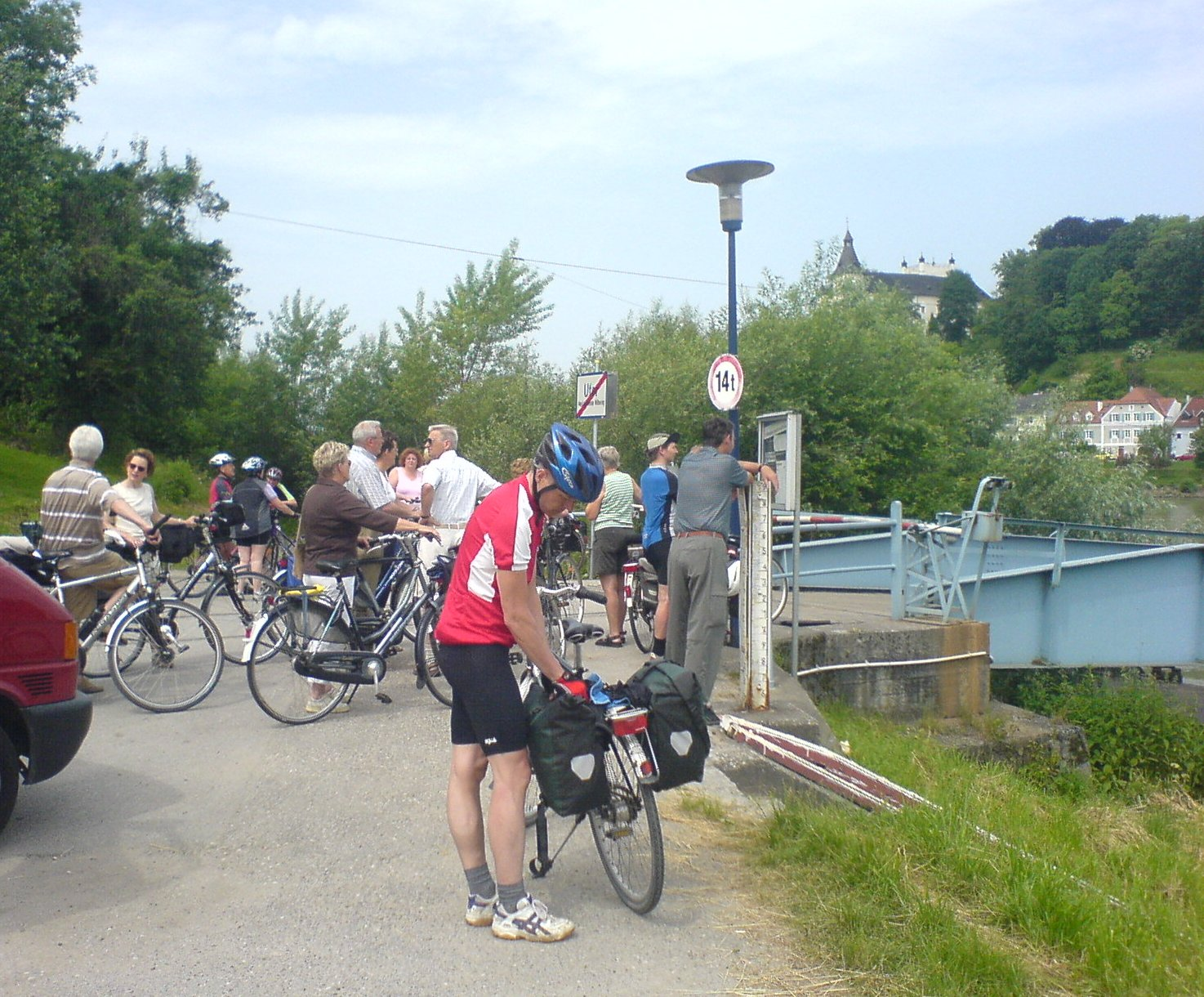
Cyclists waiting at a ferry crossing, Ufer, Austria.

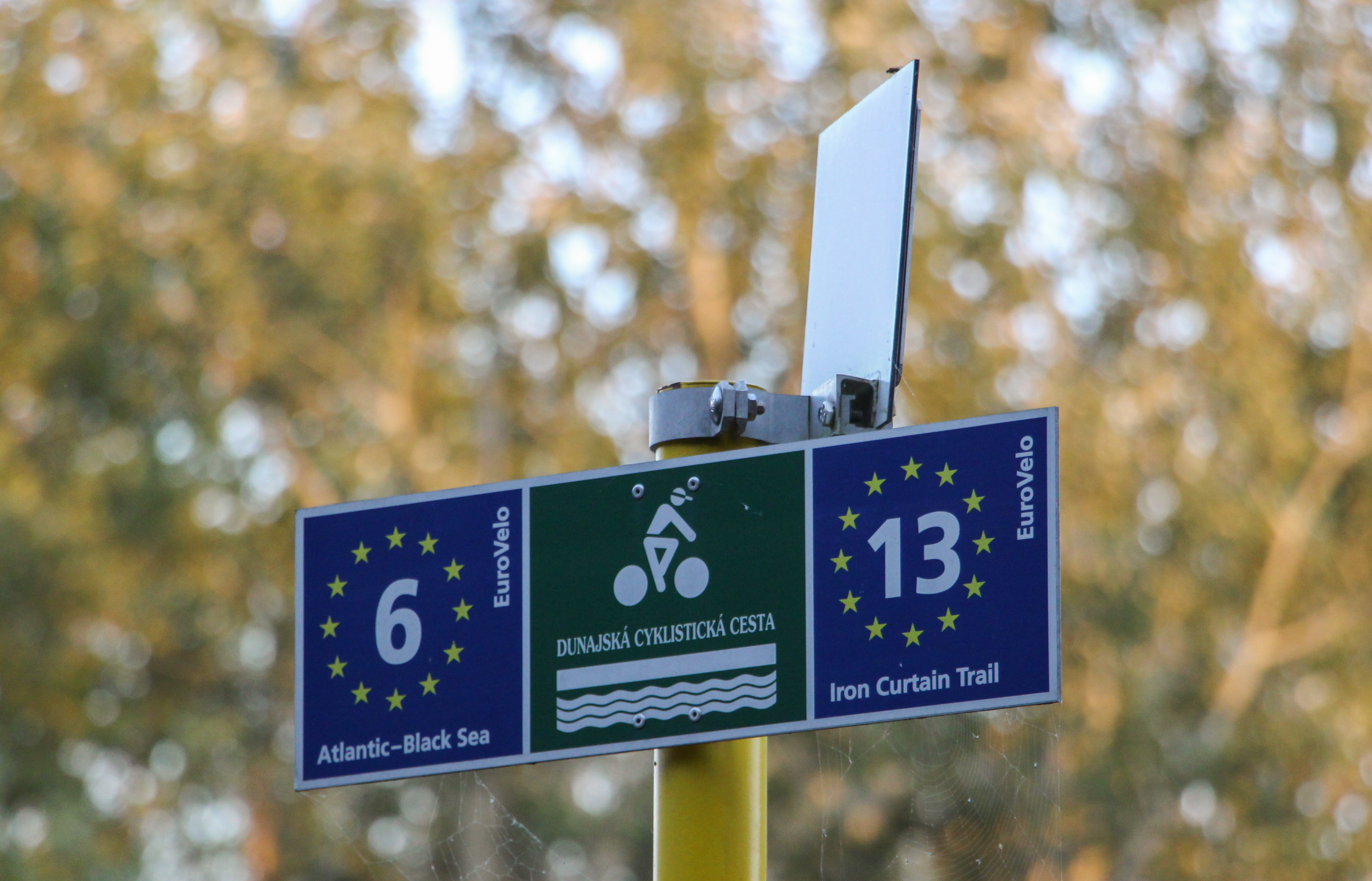
Crossroad of EV6 and EV13 (Iron Curtain Trail) in Bratislava, Slovakia.

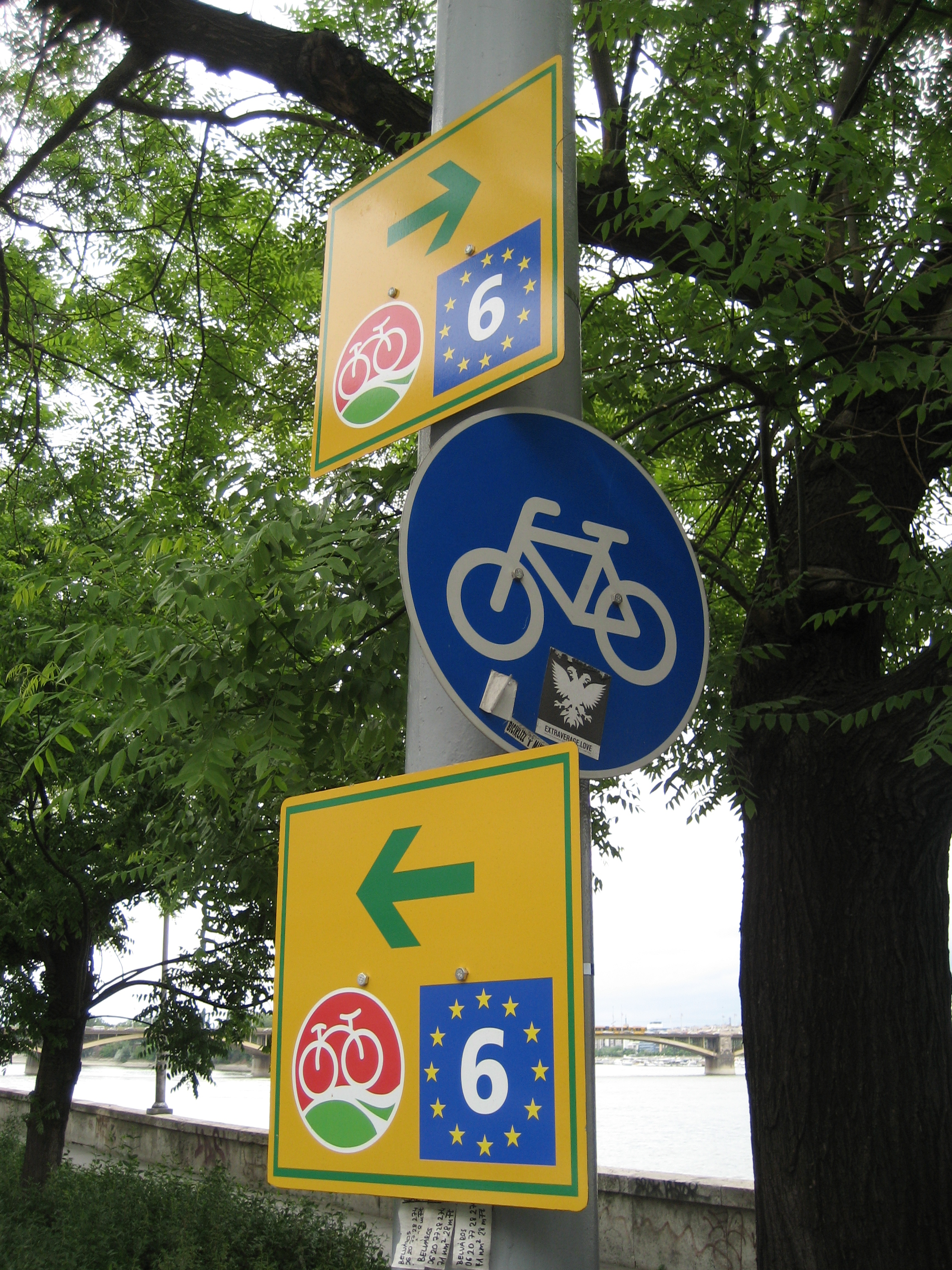
Route signs in Budapest, Hungary.

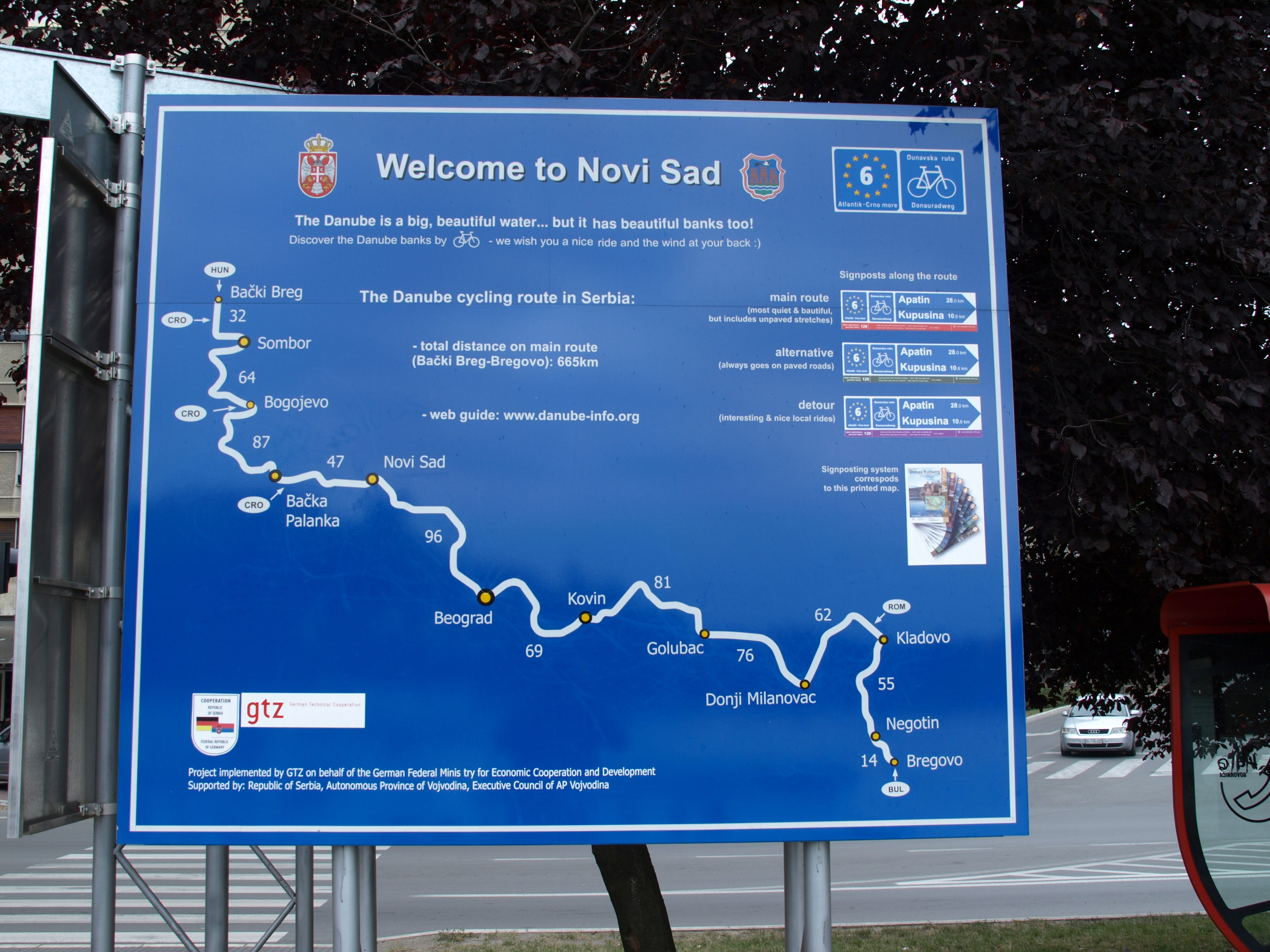
Danube bike path route map, Novi Sad, Serbia.
