= List of San Diego bike paths =

Local cycling routes in California, United States

The following is a list of bike paths in San Diego County.

== Paths ==
- Bayshore Bikeway: a bikeway around San Diego Bay with a planned length of 24 miles. Completed sections include a one-mile separated path along Harbor Drive in National City; bike lanes on Tidelands Avenue and West 32nd Street provide an interim connection pending completion of the bike path south of Civic Center Drive.
- Coastal Rail Trail: a regional corridor with completed multi-use path sections. In Encinitas, a 1.3-mile section opened in May 2019 between Chesterfield Drive and the Santa Fe Drive rail undercrossing, east of the railway. An Oceanside section between Oceanside Boulevard and Wisconsin Avenue was completed in 2014. The Rose Creek Bikeway is another component of the corridor.
- Inland Rail Trail: a multi-use path being developed along the North County rail corridor. Its easternmost seven miles, between the Escondido SPRINTER station and West Mission Road at North Pacific Street in San Marcos, were built in 2009. Further sections opened in 2017 and January 2021; the latter opening established a continuous 10.5-mile separated path between the Escondido Transit Center and Mar Vista Drive in Vista.
- Pershing Bikeway: a 2.3-mile route from Utah and Landis streets in North Park to C Street in downtown San Diego, passing through Balboa Park along Pershing Drive. Opened on July 27, 2024, it includes a two-way separated bikeway and a pedestrian path. SANDAG identifies it as a Class IV bikeway.
- Rose Creek Bikeway: a two-mile multi-use path separated from motor traffic, connecting the Rose Canyon Bike Path in University City with the Rose Creek Bike Path in Pacific Beach. Opened in May 2021, it forms part of the Coastal Rail Trail.
- SR 15 Commuter Bikeway: a one-mile path beside northbound State Route 15 between Adams Avenue and Camino del Rio South, connecting Mid-City with Mission Valley. The paved, lighted path is 12 feet wide and accommodates travel in both directions; a concrete barrier separates it from the freeway shoulder.
- San Luis Rey River Trail: an approximately nine-mile paved Class I path in Oceanside, from Neptune Way to North Santa Fe Avenue at State Route 76. Following the San Luis Rey River along a former rail corridor, it accommodates bicycles and pedestrians separately from motor traffic.
- Silver Strand Bikeway: a paved multi-use path along the Silver Strand, between Coronado and Imperial Beach. It follows a former railroad corridor alongside State Route 75 and is a component of the larger Bayshore Bikeway.
- Sweetwater Bikeway: follows the Sweetwater River from Sweetwater Regional Park past Plaza Bonita to the Bayshore Bikeway. A half-mile Class I section on the west side of Plaza Bonita Road in National City opened in 2015, linking existing paths on either side of a gap.
