= Camp Chase Trail =

Paved multi-use trail in Ohio, U.S.

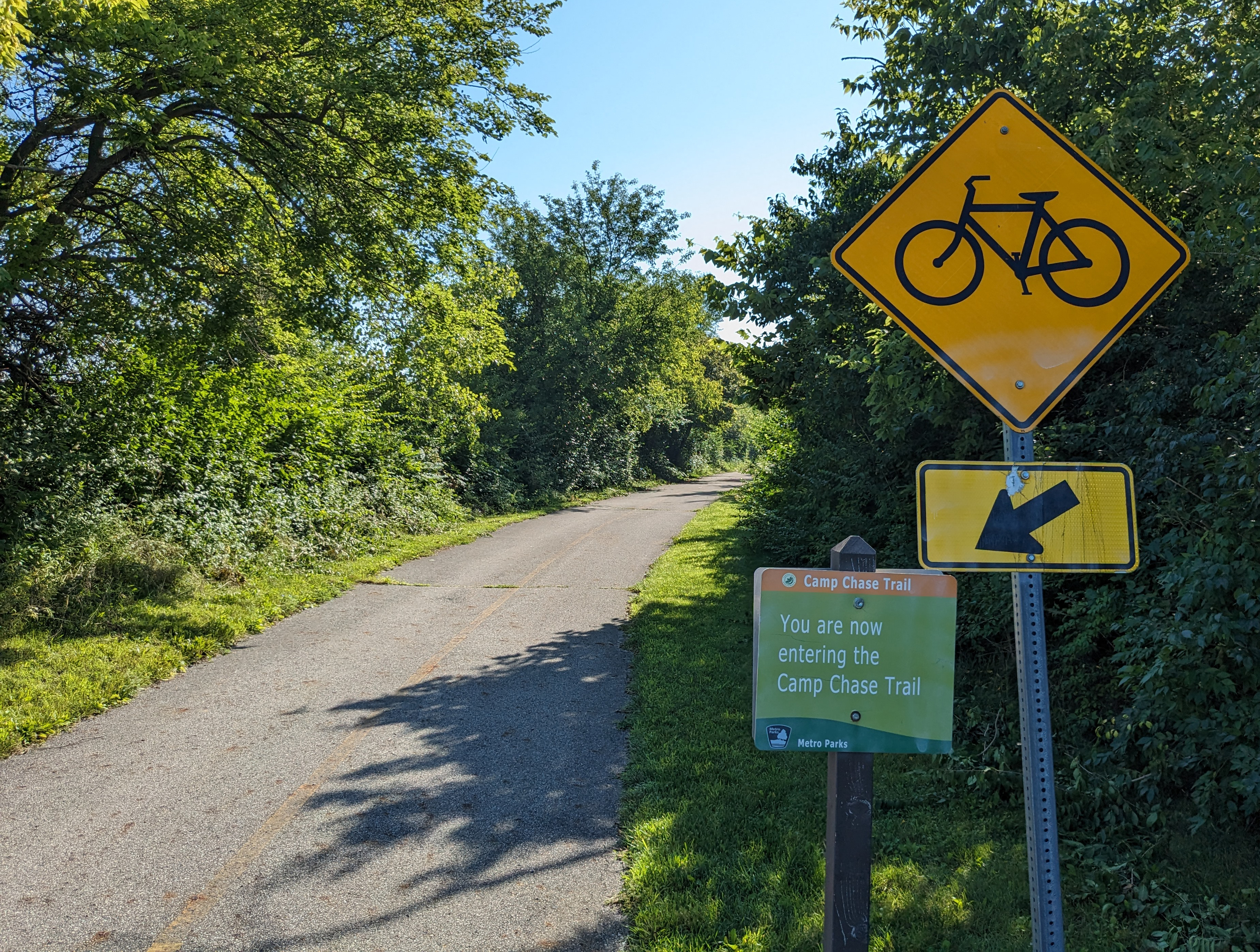
- The start of the Camp Chase Trail at the Wilson Road trailhead in Madison County, Ohio.
- Length: 15.2 mi (24.5 km)
- Location: Madison and Franklin counties, Ohio, United States
- Designation: USBR 21 / USBR 50 / State Bike Route 1
- Trailheads: Lilly Chapel to N. Eureka Ave. in Columbus, Ohio
- Use: Paved Multi-use
- Difficulty: Easy (fully accessible)
- Season: Year-round

The Camp Chase Trail is a paved multi-use trail in Madison and Franklin counties in the U.S. state of Ohio. It serves as the Southwest Columbus segment of the 326-mile (525 km) Ohio to Erie Trail. The entire length of the Camp Chase Trail is part of the Great American Rail-Trail, U.S. Bicycle Route 21 and U.S. Bicycle Route 50.

== History ==
Camp Chase Trail is named for the Camp Chase Railway it parallels. During the American Civil War, Camp Chase was a military staging and training camp for Union forces, and a prison camp for Confederates. All that remains of the camp today is a Confederate Cemetery containing 2,260 graves, located at 2900 Sullivant Ave. It was named for former Ohio Governor and Lincoln's Secretary of the Treasury Salmon P. Chase. Four future Presidents passed through Camp Chase as Union soldiers: Andrew Johnson, Rutherford B. Hayes, James Garfield, and William McKinley.

To create the Camp Chase trail, the Columbus and Franklin County Metropolitan Park District worked with the Camp Chase Rail Company to manage the regulations and construction requirements needed to acquire an easement alongside active railroad tracks, finalizing the easement in 2009. The trail was completed in 2015.

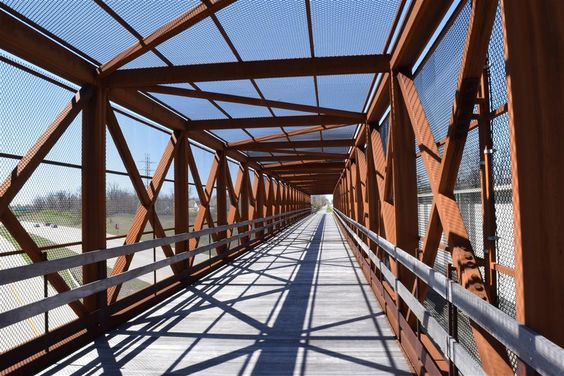
Steel Truss Bridge, which carries the Camp Chase Trail and Ohio to Erie Trail over the Columbus outer belt I-270

The bike trail is one of the few in the United States that is a rails with trails, meaning the trail runs within an active railroad right-of-way. The Camp Chase Trail has more than 12 miles of the bike trail existing within the railroad right-of-way. As of 2018, there were 343 identified rails with trails in the United States, comprising 917 miles of trails in 47 states. By comparison, there are currently 2,404 open rail-trails across the United States comprising a total of 25,723 miles along with 867 rail-trail projects planned for an additional total of 9,147 miles.

A number of design elements separate the twelve-foot-wide trail from the rail line, including fencing, grade separation and ditching. As part of the agreement that resulted in the creation of the bike trail, the trail owners indemnify the railroad company. A bridge built for the bike trail provides a way for pedestrians to cross Interstate 270 instead of trespassing on the railroad bridge, as frequently happened before the trail was built. The trail manager is required to provide the railroad with advance notification of work on the trail and trail maintenance staff "attend railroad safety classes to adequately prepare them for the responsibilities and limitations of working within an active rail corridor." The trail has seven railroad crossings, the most of any rails with trails.

== Location ==
- West terminus west of Lilly Chapel (and east terminus of Roberts Pass): 39°53′23.3″N 83°18′50.8″W
- East Terminus in Columbus at N. Eureka Ave: 39°57′48.8″N 83°03′59.5″W

== Route ==
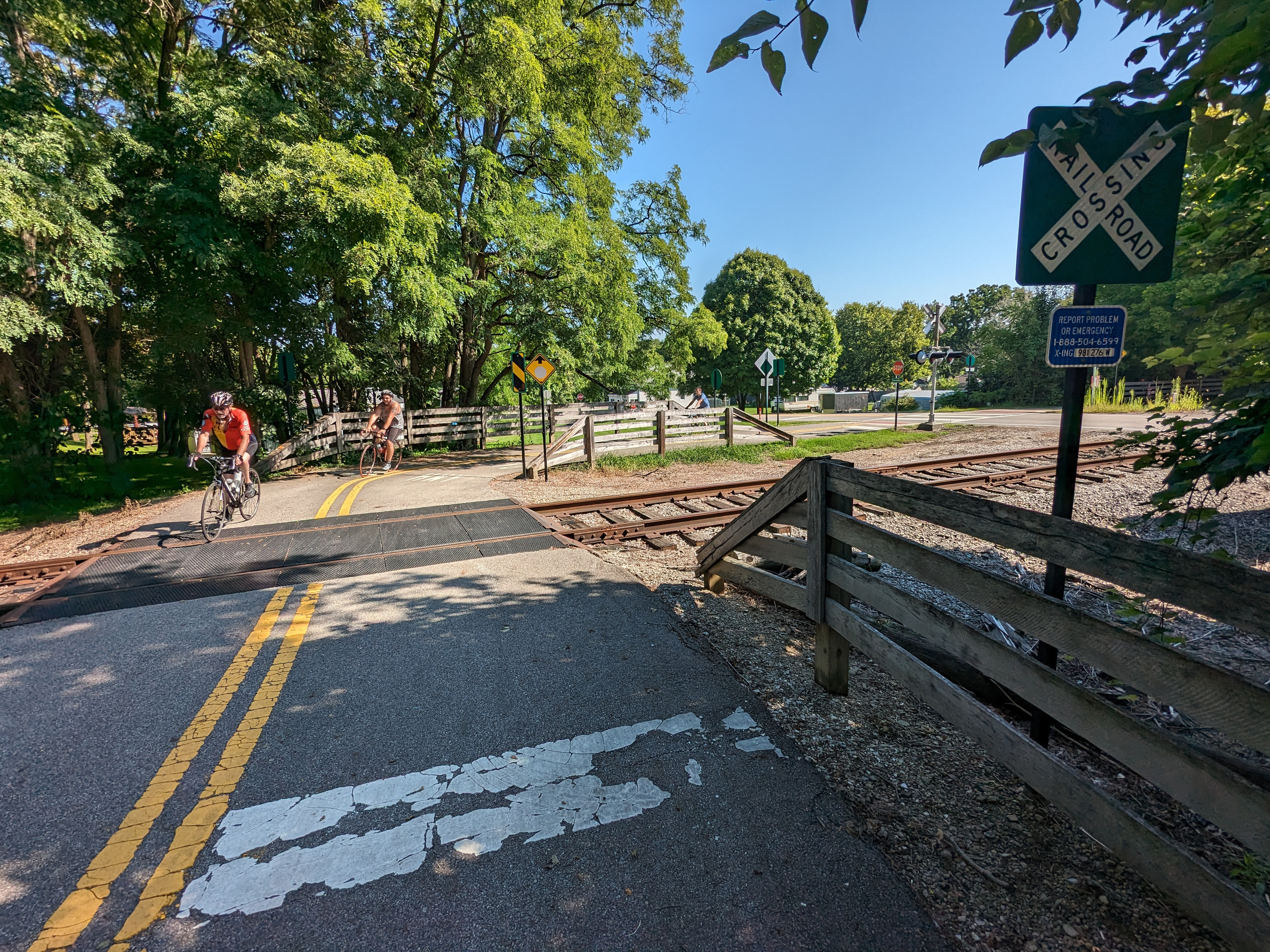
One of the railroad crossings along the Camp Chase Trail. The trail has seven crossings, the most of any rails with trails.

The Camp Chase Trail is 15.2 miles (24.5 km), with 3 miles (4.8 km) in Madison County and 12.2 miles (19.6 km) in Franklin County. The Camp Chase Trail extends from Lilly Chapel (Roberts Pass Trail) to the Columbus Hilltop Neighborhood where it connects to the Scioto Greenway Trail. The approximate midpoint of the trail is in Battelle Darby Creek Metro Park where it crosses the confluence of the Big and Little Darby Creeks.

The follows alongside the Camp Chase Railway except for a short stint along Big Darby Creek and a one mile diversion along Georgesville Road in Columbus. The Camp Chase Trail has been complete from the conjunction with the Roberts Pass trail at the Wilson Road Trailhead in Madison County, Ohio to the intersection with Sullivant Avenue in Franklin County since 2015. The City of Columbus approved funding for the final 3 miles of the Camp Chase Trail from Georgesville Road to North Eureka Ave. on November 3, 2014. and completed it December 2016. In July 2019, the trail connector parallel to Georgesville Road and Sullivant Ave was opened and replaced the Industrial Mile Road section of the trail. From the trail access at Georgesville Road, the trail continues north to N. Eureka Ave where the Ohio to Erie Trail route continues on N. Eureka Ave (North) to Valleyview Dr (East) which changes names to N. Highland Ave, then Harper Rd where the route crosses McKinley Ave. and utilizes the Hilltop Connector bridge to connect to the Scioto Greenway Trail.

The Ohio to Erie Trail is marked on the short road route to the Hilltop Connector bridge, where it joins the Scioto Greenway Trail. For the most part, the Camp Chase Trail is paved, with the exception of the 0.33 mile connector through the Battelle Darby Creek Metro Park, which is crushed, packed limestone.

Camp Chase trail is in proximity to two roads named "Wilson Road", one in each county, Wilson Road Park is in Columbus (Franklin County) at 275 S. Wilson Road.

== Communities adjacent to the trail ==
- London - Roberts Pass Trail
- Lilly Chapel
- Georgesville
- Galloway
- Cherry Creek, Columbus
- Georgian Heights, Columbus
- Holly Hill, Columbus
- Hilltop, Columbus
- Westgate, Columbus
- Highland West, Columbus
- Valleyview enclave of Columbus
- Grandview Heights - Scioto Greenway Trail

== Trailside amenities ==
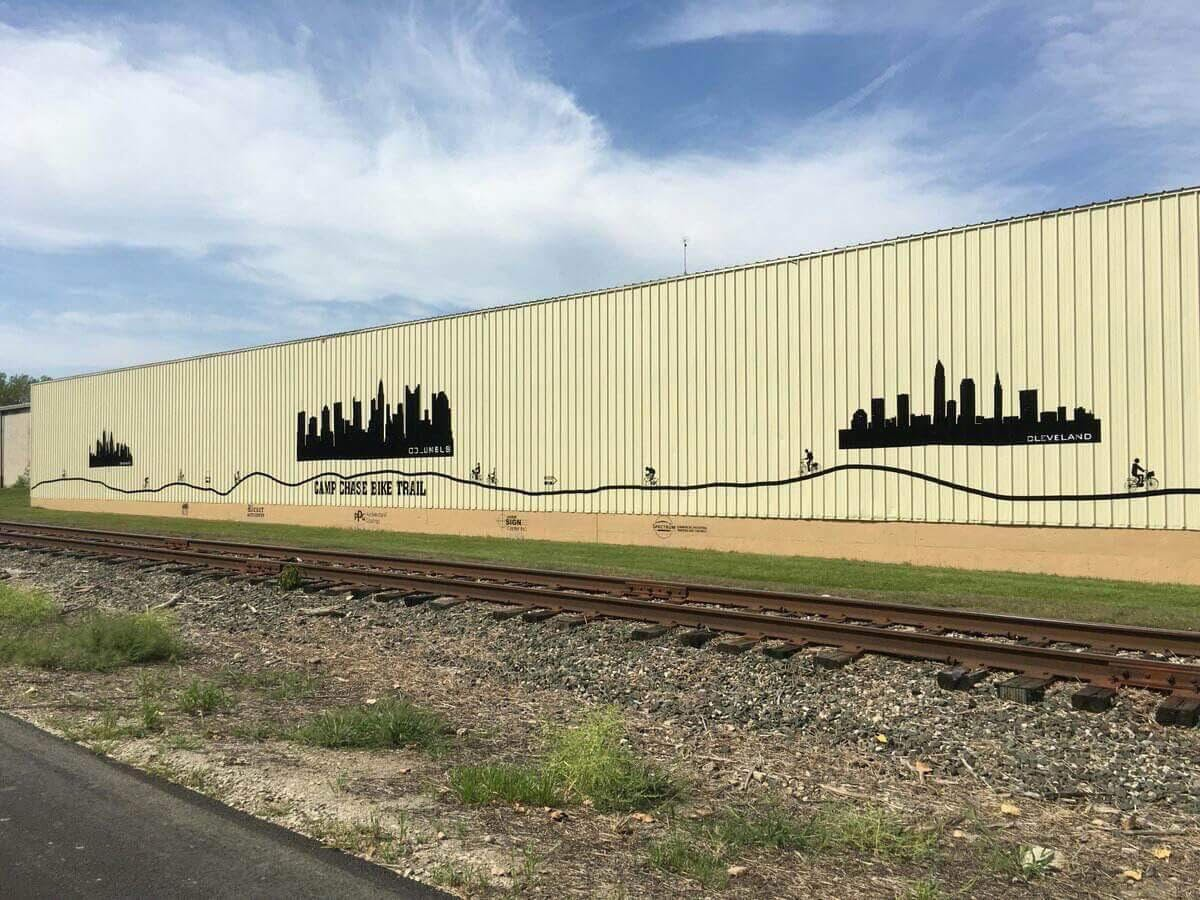
The Ohio to Erie Trail Mural, Sue Killilea

- Southern Trail head: Roberts Pass Trail Wilson Rd London, OH 43140 [Portable Restroom, Bike Rack, Car Parking, No Water] 39°53′24″N 83°18′48″W
- Lily Chapel Trail side Shelter: [Covered 2-Sided Shelter, Picnic Table, Bike Rack]
- Battelle Darby Creek Trail head: 8465 Alkire Rd, Galloway, OH 43140 [Restrooms, Picnic Area, Canoe Access, Car Parking, Indian Ridge Pump (well) water] 39°53′37″N 83°12′57″W
- Columbus Wilson Road Park, 275 S. Wilson Road, Columbus, OH 43204 39°56′52″N 83°05′52″W [Drinking Fountain, Portable Restroom, Lighted Picnic Area, Bike Repair Station and tire pump, Parking Lot]
- Northern Trailhead: north of Columbus Holton Park Columbus, OH 43204, approximately at 375 N Eureka Ave.39°57′42″N 83°04′02″W

== Local attractions ==
- Battelle Darby Creek Metro Park. 8465 Alkire Road, Galloway OH 43119; 39°53′36″N 83°12′57″W
- Camp Chase Confederate Cemetery 39°56′38″N 83°04′33″W
- Ohio to Erie Trail Granite Monument 301 N Hague Ave, Columbus, OH 43204; 39°57′41″N 83°04′34″W
- National Road Historical Markers
- Columbus Recreation and Parks, Wilson Road Park trail head to Camp Chase Trail
- Hollywood Casino Columbus
- Movin' & Groovin' Mural, by artist Roger J Williams commissioned for the 2017 Summer Jam West; visible from the trail just east of N. Sylvan Ave. 39°57′25″N 83°05′11″W
- Columbus Recreation and Parks, West Side: Big Run Park and Athletic Complex, Westgate Park, WestmoorPark, Holton Park, Glenview Park

== Milestones ==
- March 21, 2012: Trail bridge over Darby Creek brings the trail into Battelle Darby Creek Metro Park
- October 10, 2013: The Friends of the Camp Chase Trail held their first meeting at the Haydocy Automotive Community Room. Area citizens met with members of the Friends of Madison County Parks and Trails to discuss creating a similar function for the Camp Chase Trail.
- November 15, 2013: Completion of the Trail segment east of Battelle Darby Creek Metro Park
- April 8, 2014: Friends of the Camp Chase Trail introduced the trail at the Westland Area Business Association Meeting at Darby Dan Farm.
- July 14, 2014: WSA Studio presented to the friends of Camp Chase Trail and Community Stakeholders regarding the Wilson Road Trailhead at the Haydocy Community Room.
- October 12, 2014: Camp Chase Trail partnered with the Friends of Madison County Parks and Trails to host a table at Darby Creek Days at Battelle Darby Creek Metro Park an event held annually in the Indian Ridge section of the park.
- November 3, 2014: Columbus City Council approves funding to construct the Camp Chase Trail between Georgesville Road and North Eureka Ave.
- November 13, 2014: Paving completed on the Camp Chase Trail between Alton Road and Galloway Road.
- March 28, 2015: Camp Chase Trail Day was celebrated at Battelle Darby Creek Metro Park
- October 30, 2015, Friends of Camp Chase Trail hosted the Opening Trail Ride on the newest 3 mile section between Galloway Road and Sullivant Ave, including the 100 Yard bridge over Interstate 270. 36 trail friends were in attendance.
- December 5, 2015, The Camp Chase Trail Hilltop Action Team was established to monitor conditions in the trail corridor for the trail area from Georgesville Road to N. Eureka Ave. The Columbus Westside Running Club was formed by meeting attendees and began holding group runs at Columbus Westgate Park on January 12, 2016.
- December 1, 2016, The Camp Chase Trail is fully paved between Georgesville Road and N. Eureka Ave which represents the conclusion of the major construction of Camp Chase Trail.
- July 20, 2017, City of Columbus Recreation and Parks Department hosted the dedication of the new Wilson Road Park and Camp Chase Trailhead at 275 S. Wilson Road, Columbus, OH 43204
- July 7, 2018, the Hilltop U.S.A. 5K is the first timed race on the Camp Chase Trail.
- May 8, 2019, Camp Chase Trail was one of four locations to host a route reveal celebration for the Rails-to-Trails Conservancy's Great American Rail-Trail
- July 2019, City of Columbus Recreation and Parks completed the half-mile trail segment along Georgesville Road and Sullivant Ave.
- May 2020, Columbus and Franklin County Metro Parks completed the new 1 mile segment through the woods in Battelle Darby Creek Metro Park.

== See also ==
- Ohio to Erie Trail
- Roberts Pass Trail
- Scioto Greenway Trail
- Camp Chase
