= CCRA =

CCRA may refer to:

- Camp Chase Railway (former reporting code for railroad), Columbus, Ohio, United States
- Canada Customs and Revenue Agency, a 1999–2003 Canadian government body
- Center City Residents' Association, an organization in Philadelphia, Pennsylvania, United States
- Certified Clinical Research Associate, an accreditation obtained through the Association of Clinical Research Professionals
- Climate Change Risk Assessment, an exercise & report by the UK Government
- Common Criteria Recognition Arrangement, an international mutual recognition arrangement
- Cannabis Control and Regulatory Authority, Pakistan cannabis control authority
