= U.S. Bicycle Route 50 =

United States Bicycle Route

U.S. Bicycle Route 50

Route information
- Length: 1,500.65 mi (2,415.06 km)
- Existed: 2013–present

Western section
- West end: USBR 95 at the Golden Gate Bridge in San Francisco, California
- Major intersections: USBR 79 near Garrison, Utah
- East end: Border, Utah

Eastern section
- West end: Near Terre Haute, Indiana
- Major intersections: USBR 35 in New Palestine, Indiana; USBR 25 in Dayton, Ohio; USBR 21 from Xenia to Columbus, Ohio; USBR 50A in Westerville, Ohio; BicyclePA Route A in Cecil Township, Pennsylvania; BicyclePA Route S in Rockwood, Pennsylvania; USBR 11 in Brunswick, Maryland; USBR 1 in Washington, D.C.
- East end: Washington, D.C.

Location
- Country: United States
- States: California, Nevada, Indiana, Ohio, West Virginia, Pennsylvania, Maryland, District of Columbia

Highway system
- United States Bicycle Route System; List
← USBR 45	USBR 70 →

U.S. Bicycle Route 50 (USBR 50) is a planned east–west cross country U.S. Bicycle Route that currently consists of two discontiguous sections: a western section between San Francisco and Border, Utah, and an eastern section between Terre Haute, Indiana, and Washington, D.C.

== Route description ==
Lengths
	mi	km
CA	233	375
NV	409.6	659.2
IN	171.0	275.2
OH	309.6	498.3
WV	9.35	15.05
PA	160	260
MD	204.5	329.1
DC	3.6	5.8
Total	1,500.65	2,415.06

=== California ===
USBR 50 begins in San Francisco. It incorporates a ferry ride across the San Francisco Bay, the Jedediah Smith Memorial Trail in Sacramento County, the El Dorado Trail in El Dorado County, and the Mormon Emigrant Trail before reaching South Lake Tahoe.

=== Nevada ===
USBR 50 crosses the state line at Stateline, Nevada, then follows U.S. Route 50 for 409.6 miles (659.2 km) to the Utah state line at Border, Utah, with a brief detour along State Route 722. Near the eastern terminus is a junction with State Route 487, which leads to U.S. Bicycle Route 79 at the Utah state line near Garrison, Utah. The Nevada segment of USBR 50 includes 12 summits over 6,000 feet (1,800 m). It passes near Great Basin National Park.

=== Indiana ===
After a large gap in the Midwestern United States, USBR 50 traverses eight counties in Indiana, from the Illinois state line just outside Terre Haute to the Ohio state line outside Richmond. The route through Indiana roughly parallels the Historic National Road (U.S. Route 40), except for a bypass to the south of Indianapolis. USBR 50 briefly joins U.S. Bicycle Route 35 in New Palestine.

=== Ohio ===
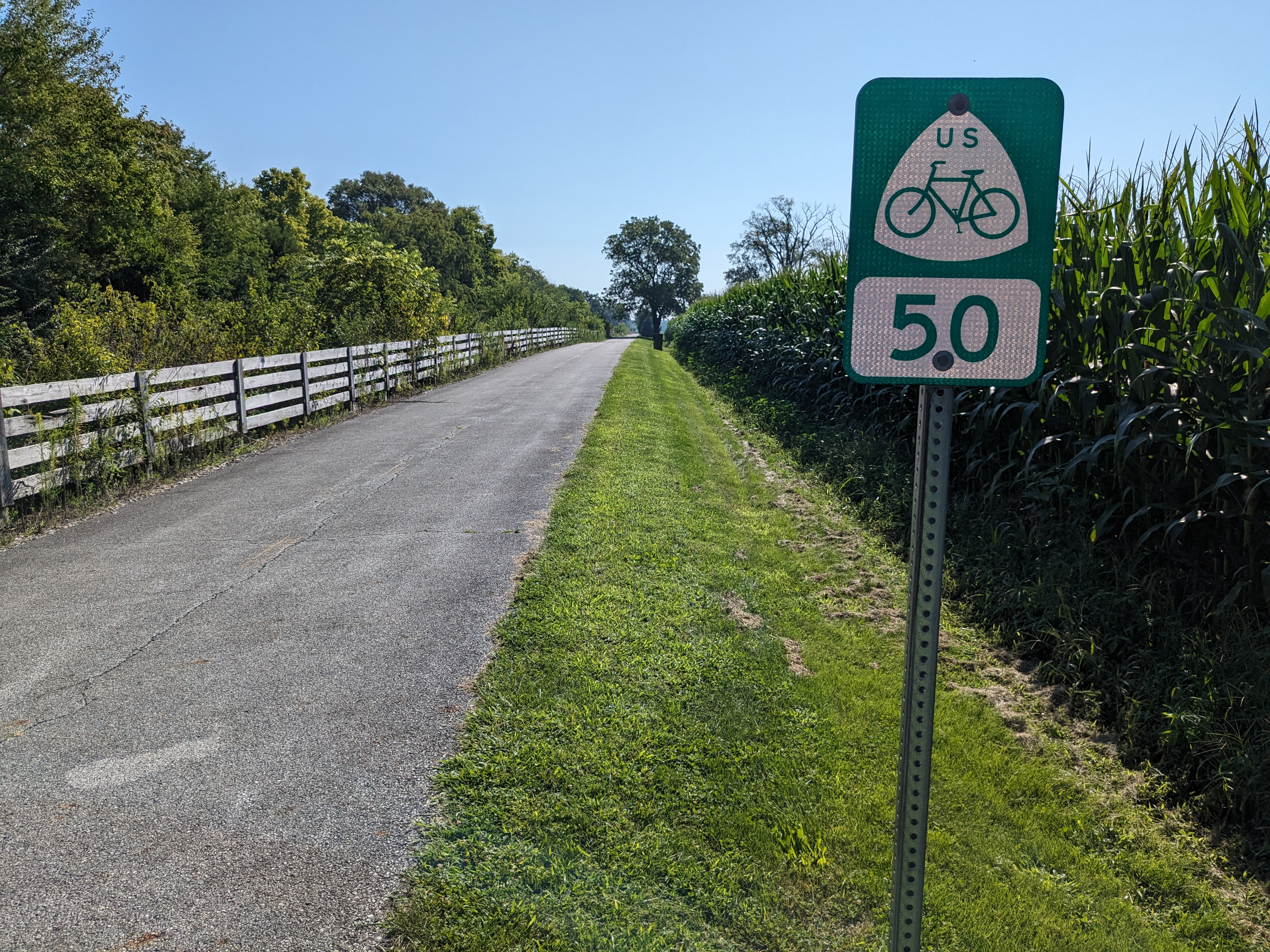
U.S. Bicycle Route 50 along the Camp Chase Trail in Franklin County, Ohio.

USBR 50 continues through Ohio, traversing 11 counties to the Market Street Bridge that connects Steubenville and Follansbee, West Virginia.

The route through Ohio incorporates a number of rail trails. From west to east, it follows the Wolf Creek Recreation Trail, Great Miami River Recreation Trail, Mad River Recreation Trail, Creekside Trail, Little Miami Scenic Trail, Prairie Grass Trail, Roberts Pass, Camp Chase Trail, Scioto Greenway Trail, Alum Creek Greenway Trail, Thomas J. Evans Trail, and Panhandle Trail. USBR 50 also runs along state and U.S. routes, especially in the more rugged terrain east of Newark. In Xenia, USBR 50 shares a short segment of the Little Miami trail with State Bike Route 3. From Xenia to Columbus, it shares the Prairie Grass, Roberts Pass, and Camp Chase trails – local segments the Ohio to Erie Trail – with U.S. Bicycle Route 21 and State Bike Route 1.

=== West Virginia ===
This is in the Northern Panhandle of West Virginia. The route begins at the Market Street Bridge at its crossing the Ohio River and connects to the Panhandle Trail and continues on into Pennsylvania.

=== Pennsylvania ===
USBR 50 mostly follows the Panhandle and Montour Trails and the Great Allegheny Passage as it crosses five counties to connect Colliers, West Virginia, with Frostburg, Maryland. From West Newton to Rockwood, it shares the Great Allegheny Passage with BicyclePA Route S.

=== Maryland and Washington, D.C. ===
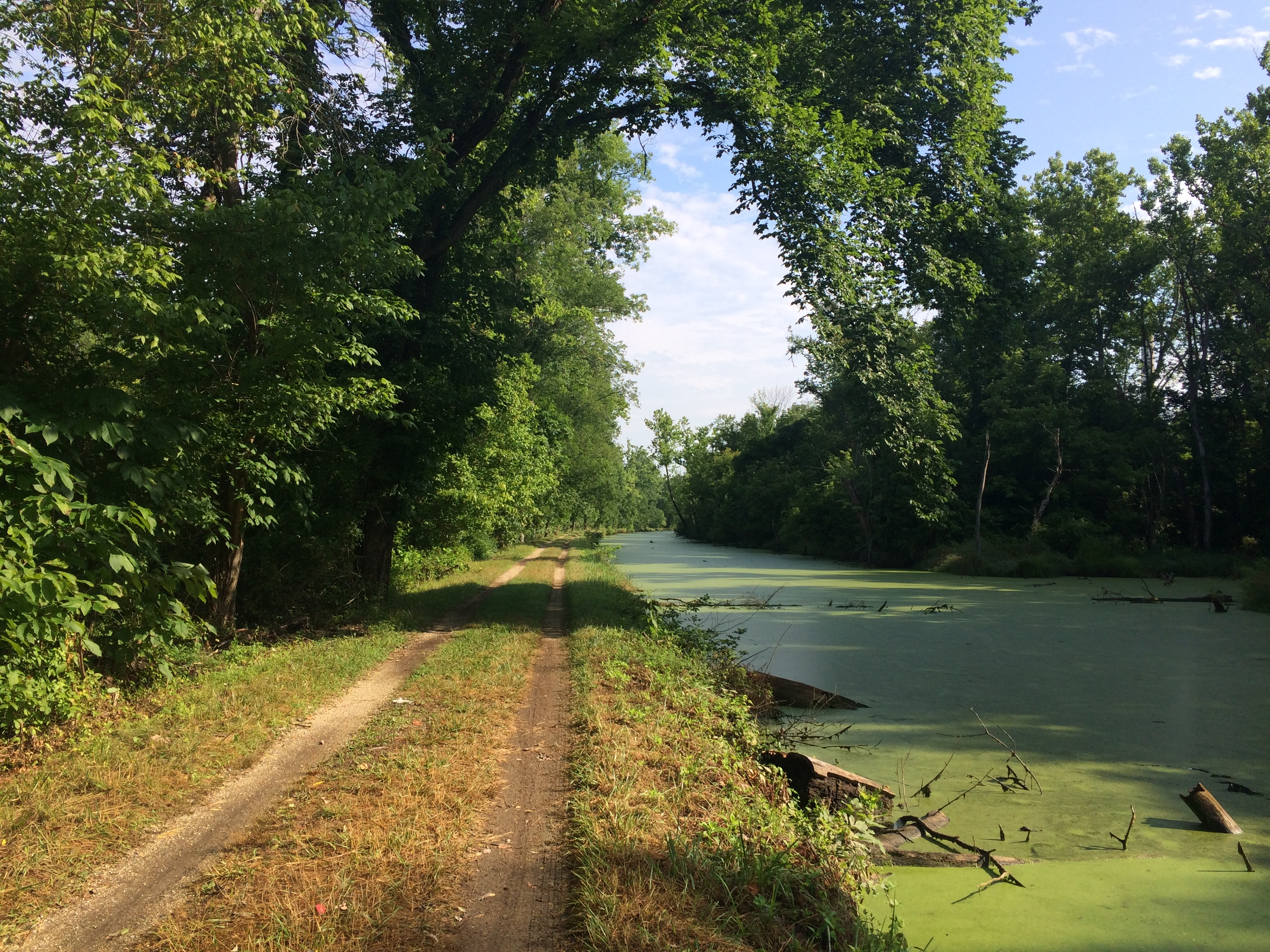
Chesapeake & Ohio Canal towpath section of U.S. Bicycle Route 50 in Maryland.

From the Pennsylvania state line near Frostburg, USBR 50 continues along the Great Allegheny Passage and then follows the Chesapeake & Ohio Canal Towpath to the Georgetown neighborhood of Washington, D.C. U.S. Bicycle Route 11 currently terminates at USBR 50 in Brunswick, Maryland. After crossing the Washington, D.C. line, the Arizona Avenue Bridge, carrying the Capital Crescent Trail, eventually passes over USBR 50, after which the final three miles of the route run close and parallel to the Capital Crescent Trail. U.S. Bicycle Route 1 is accessible close to the terminus of USBR 50 south of the Potomac River in Virginia.

== History ==
The first segment of USBR 50, incorporating the length of the C&O Canal Towpath in Maryland, was approved by the American Association of State Highway and Transportation Officials (AASHTO) on October 23, 2013. On May 29, 2014, AASHTO approved additional segments in Ohio and Washington, D.C., including the remaining 3.6 miles (5.8 km) of the C&O Towpath. On September 25, 2015, AASHTO approved the route through Indiana, as well as an alternate route in the Columbus, Ohio, area that had been part of Ohio's original route proposal. USBR 50 signs were posted along the Ohio segment in the summer of 2016. AASHTO approved the 160-mile-long (260 km) route across Pennsylvania in 2017 and the 410-mile-long (660 km) route across Nevada the following year. AASHTO also approved a 2018 realignment of USBR 50 in Ohio, trimming 5 miles (8.0 km) from the route, passing through Hopedale and bypassing Alexandria. In the Fall 2018, AASHTO approved a realignment within London, Ohio, adding 1.3 miles (2.1 km) to the route. AASHTO approved the route across West Virginia at their Fall 2019 meeting.

== Auxiliary routes ==
=== U.S. Bicycle Route 50A ===
U.S. Bicycle Route 50A
- Location: Westerville–Alexandria, Ohio
- Length: 32.3 mi (52.0 km)
- Existed: 2015–present

U.S. Bicycle Route 50A (USBR 50A) is an alternate route through Delaware and Licking counties northeast of Columbus, Ohio. During planning for USBR 50 in Ohio, this route was proposed as a scenic route. However, it was omitted from the USBR 50 proposal approved by AASHTO in 2013. USBR 50A was later approved by AASHTO in 2015. The route extends from Westerville to Alexandria over various local roads as well as the Thomas J. Evans Trail, Hoover Scenic Trail, and Genoa Township Trail (part of the Ohio to Erie Trail).

== See also ==
- American Discovery Trail, a long-distance hiking trail with similar endpoints
