= Georgesville, Ohio =

- Unincorporated community
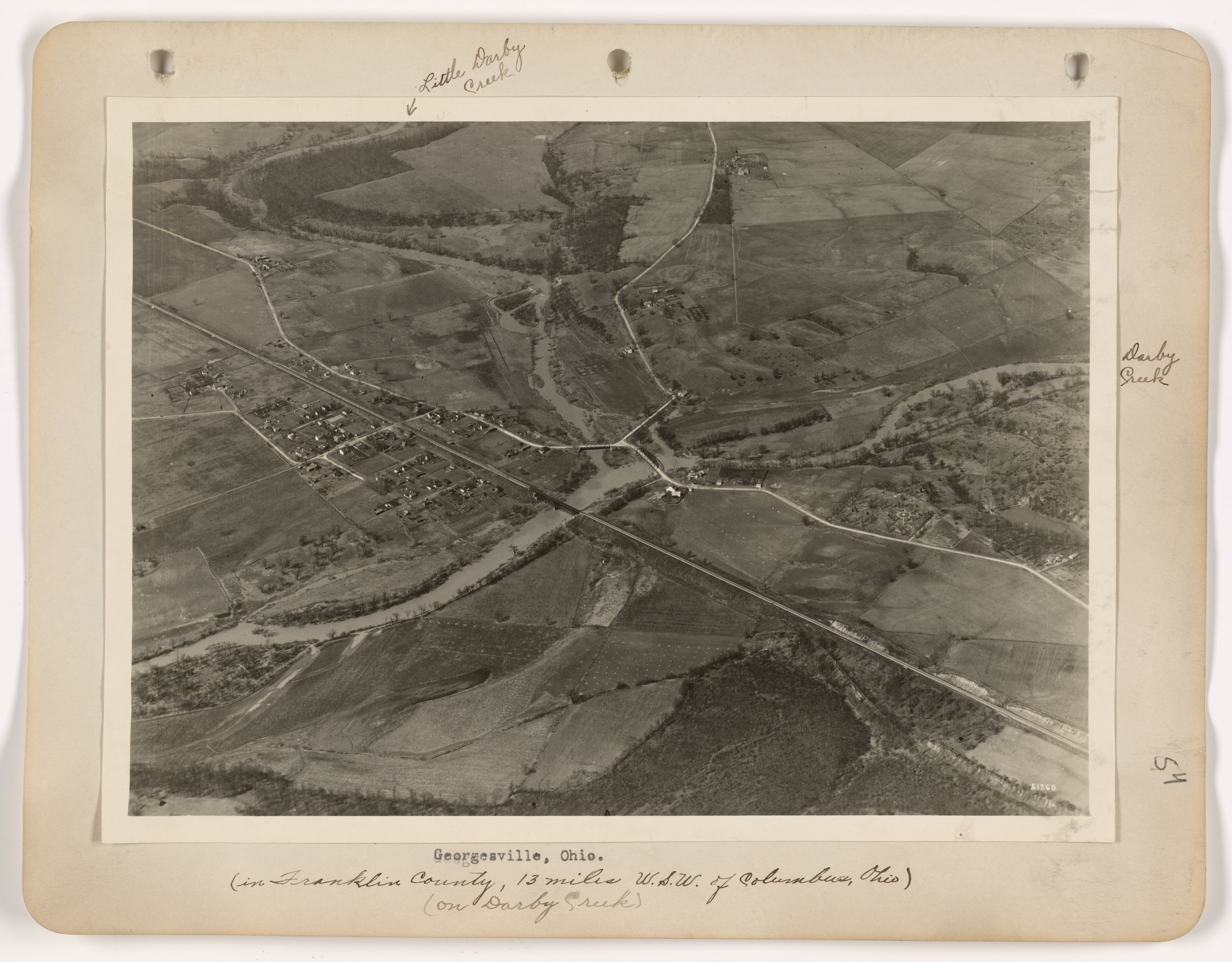
- Historic photo of Georgesville, Ohio

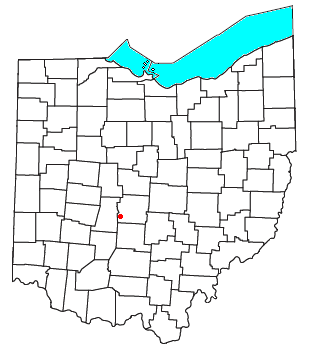
- Location of Georgesville, Ohio
- Coordinates: 39°53′27″N 83°13′19″W
- Country: United States
- State: Ohio
- County: Franklin
- Township: Pleasant
- Elevation: 883 ft (269 m)
- Time zone: UTC-5 (Eastern (EST))
  - Summer (DST): UTC-4 (EDT)
- ZIP codes: 43119 (Galloway)
- Area code: 614
- GNIS feature ID: 1064712

Georgesville is an unincorporated community in western Pleasant Township, Franklin County, Ohio, United States. It is located southwest of Columbus, the county seat of Franklin County and the capital and largest city of Ohio.

== History ==
The confluence of the Big and Little Darby Creeks seen the presence of Native Americans for thousands of years. This presence is documented at the O.C. Voss site that includes a Fort Ancient village and ceremonial mound. The reconstructed mound is located along the Ancient Trail in Battelle Darby Creek Park.

In 1797, Georgesville was founded as Central Ohio's first permanent European settlement (the same year as Franklinton). The town was originally situated on the eastern bank of Big Darby, now the site of Oak Grove Cemetery. A railway station was built on the western bank of Big Darby, and Georgesville occupies this west bank site today, although the railway station is long gone. A minor debate exists as to which European settlement, Georgesville or Franklinton (later Columbus) was first laid down in the area later known as the State of Ohio. What is not disputed is that Native Americans such as the Shawnee Tribe were long established in the Scioto River valley and adjoining high bank areas before European settlers moved to the area.

The rail line is still active with service to the grain silos in the nearby village of Lilly Chapel. Outside seasonal transport of farm products the line has seen use as storage for surplus rail cars. The rail line is listed as CAMY on the Ohio Rail Map. This rail line ends just west of Lilly Chapel although its abandoned right-of-way continues west to London, Ohio.

The current rail line towers over the Darby Creek just south of the Confluence. The current rail bridge is partially built on the foundations of a former rail bridge with unused foundation pillars remaining. The current bridge is a steel beam construction.

Alkire Road, which travels west and east out of the village, originally featured two wooden covered bridges, spanning the Big and Little Darby above their confluence. The covered bridges were replaced by steel truss bridges (a Pratt truss over Little Darby and a Camelback truss over Big Darby), which were in turn replaced by modern reinforced concrete bridges, in a new configuration, in the 1990s. Before the truss bridges were torn down ODOT and the Franklin County Engineer conducted tests involving maximum load on the steel structures. At the time these bridge types were still in common use throughout the Midwest. The testing & destruction of the bridges provided a wealth of information for civil engineers. Reports indicated that designs were sound but the fixed height of overhead truss members limited vehicle heights.

This area was subject to historic flooding in 1913, as was the rest of the lower Ohio region that year.

Today the Darby Creek waterways is one of many entry points for Battelle Darby Creek Park. The Darby Creek watershed is one of the most biologically diverse aquatic systems in the Midwest due to conservation efforts in the area along the waterway. State and National designations have been placed upon the creeks in recent years. The park is part of the Columbus and Franklin County Metro Parks and is bordered by sister parks upstream and downstream forming the western boundary of the metro park system. Battelle is a research and development organization based in Columbus. They have maintained a long sponsorship & corporate connection with the park. Battelle maintains a large research facility along the banks of the Big Darby Creek in Madison County.

The Camp Chase Multi-Use Trail runs alongside the still active rail line running through the village. The Camp Chase Trail is 16.2-mile (26.1 km) and is part of the larger Ohio to Erie Trail system which connects NE Ohio, Columbus and Cincinnati.

The Georgesville Fish Fry was a staple event for many years although it is now held infrequently. It was held in the village center near the old Fire Station.

== Geography ==
Georgesville lies at the confluence of Little Darby Creek and Big Darby Creek, which are State and National Scenic Rivers and tributaries of the Scioto River. Much of the swamp forest and prairie surrounding Georgesville is part of Battelle Darby Creek Park.

== Notable persons ==
- George L. Converse, U.S. Representative from Ohio (1879–1881)
- John Lewis Dyer, Methodist preacher, born and raised in Georgesville

== See also ==
- Roberts Pass
