= Camp Chase Railway =

Short-line railroad in Ohio, United States

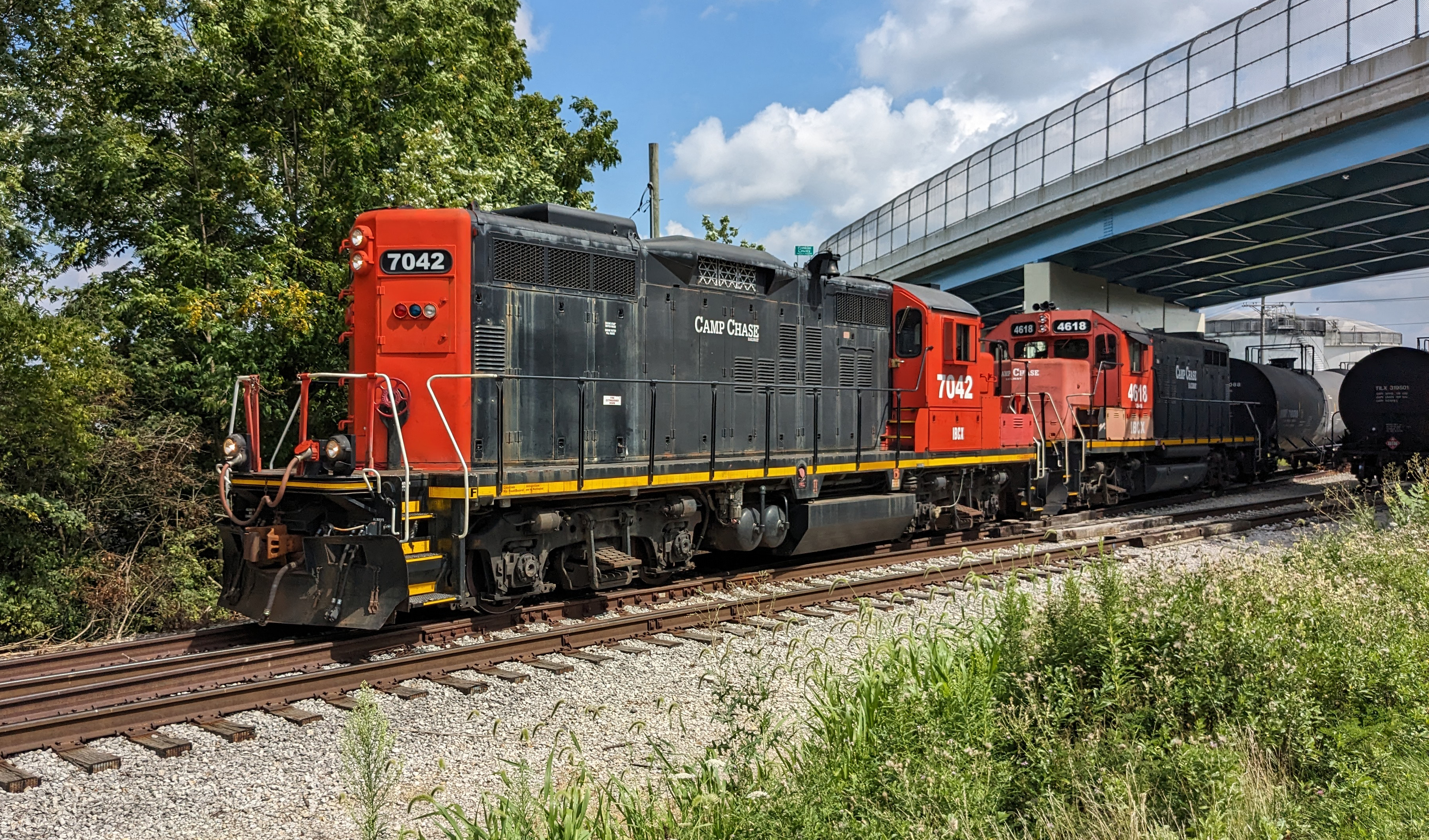
- A Camp Chase Railway train

Overview
- Headquarters: Connersville, Indiana
- Reporting mark: CAMY
- Locale: Ohio
- Dates of operation: 1994–present

Technical
- Track gauge: 4 ft 8 1/2 in (1,435 mm) standard gauge
- Length: 14 miles (23 km)

The Camp Chase Railway (reporting mark CAMY) is a short-line switching and terminal railroad in and near Columbus, Ohio, United States, running past the former Camp Chase. The company was formed as the Camp Chase Industrial Railroad in 1994 as a spin-off of Conrail. Through trackage rights, the railroad interchanges with Norfolk Southern Railway at Watkins Yard and CSX at Parsons Yard. The Camp Chase bike trail follows alongside the railroad for 12 miles and is one the few trails in the United States that runs within an active railroad right-of-way.

== History ==
=== Predecessors ===
The Columbus, Springfield and Cincinnati Railroad opened the line between Columbus and London in 1872, and it became part of the Cleveland, Cincinnati, Chicago and St. Louis Railway's (Big Four's) main line west from Columbus to St. Louis and later part of the New York Central Railroad.

The Ohio State Limited ran daily along the line with stops in Lilly Chapel, Georgesville, Galloway, and Columbus. The Ohio State Limited ceased service on the line in the 1960s.

The Penn Central Transportation Company shifted traffic to the ex-Pennsylvania Railroad line between Columbus and London, and the portion of the old Big Four line west of Lilly Chapel was not included in Conrail in 1976. The remainder was kept as a minor branch line, the Camp Chase Industrial Track.

=== Camp Chase Industrial Railroad ===
On October 11, 1994, the new Camp Chase Industrial Railroad bought the line from Conrail. In 1996, it was reported that the railroad had one engine and traffic of 3,000 cars a year, carrying newsprint, grain, flour and lumber.

The Camp Chase Industrial Railroad has been marketed under the name Camp Chase Railroad beginning around 2009. On September 30, 2015, Carload Express, Inc. announced that its Camp Chase Railroad Company has sold its line of railroad to Camp Chase Railway Company, LLC; a wholly owned subsidiary of Indiana Boxcar Corporation. Camp Chase Railway ("CAMY") assumed operations of the 14-mile (23 km) rail line, which runs from Columbus to Lilly Chapel, Ohio, beginning on Thursday October 1, 2015. Most of CAMY freight revenue comes from grain being transported along the rails going either to some of the grain elevators along the track, or to be interchanged with NS at the Buckeye Yard. The Camp Chase Railroad was featured on the WOSU show Columbus Neighborhoods on November 16, 2017.

The line was owned by Indiana Boxcar Corporation from 2015 to 2019, and in September 2020 was one of four shortlines bought by Midwest & Bluegrass Rail LLC of Kansas City. In 2023, Gulf & Atlantic Railways purchased the railroad along with two other shortlines.

Through trackage rights, the CCRA interchanges with Norfolk Southern Railway at Watkins Yard and CSX at Parsons Yard. The railroad also generates income by storing cars along unused portions of their tracks. The railroad serves a number of customers including a transloading facility, major agri-businesses, an ethanol plant and, until it closed, the printing plant for The Columbus Dispatch. In 2013, the Camp Chase Railway ran approximately one train a day at less than 10 miles per hour (16 km/h). The company's tracks end in Lilly Chapel.

== Rolling stock ==
CCRA owns three EMD GP9 engines, numbers 4618, 7042, and 7076. The railroad previously owned a GP9 engine numbered 7225 along with several EMD SW1500. The current engines are painted orange and black, with white "Camp Chase" lettering. The railway also owned an older orange and white engine, number 752 with orange "Camp Chase Railway" lettering.

Camp Chase Railway engines
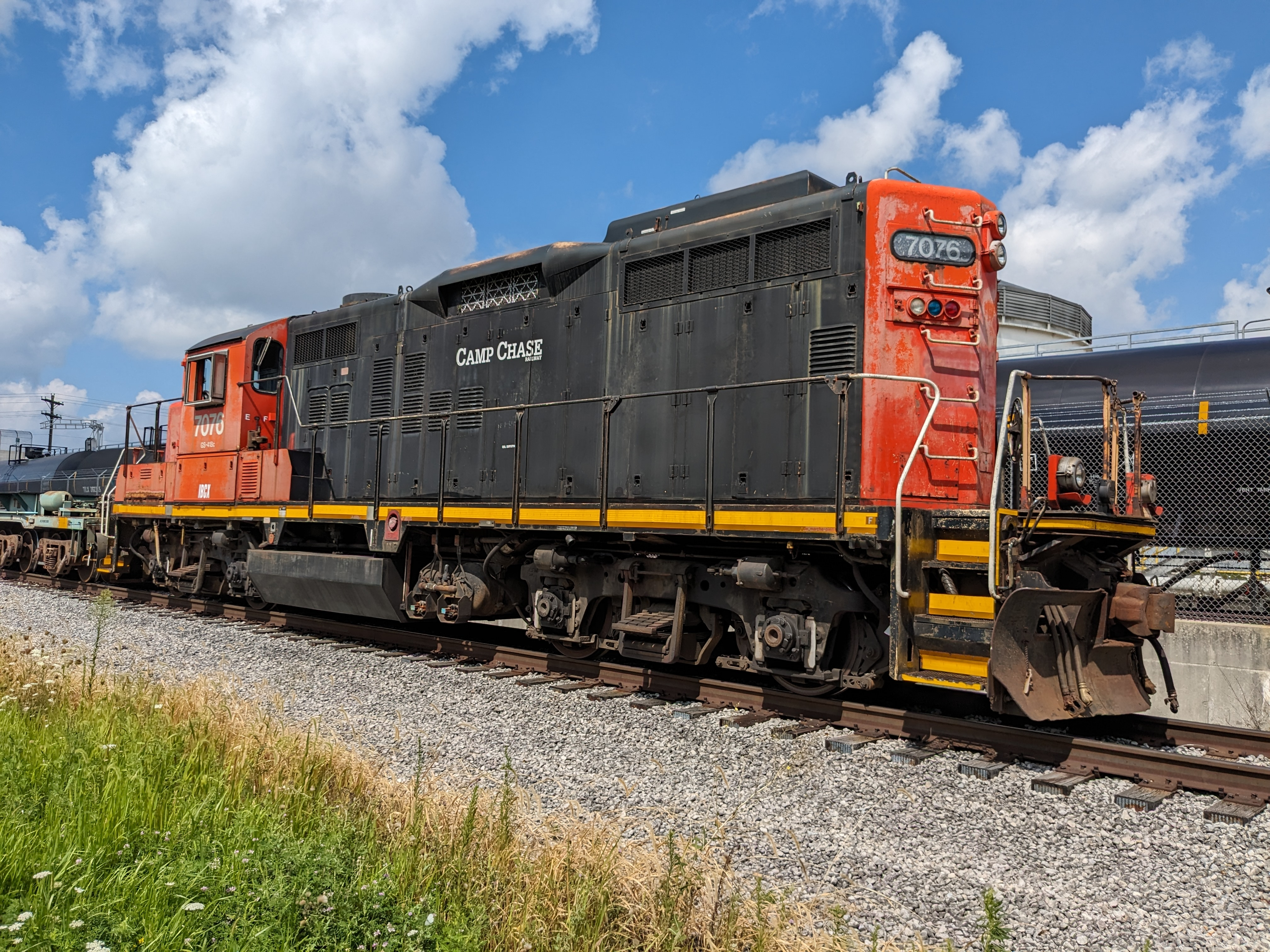
Camp Chase Railway engine 7076 in 2023.

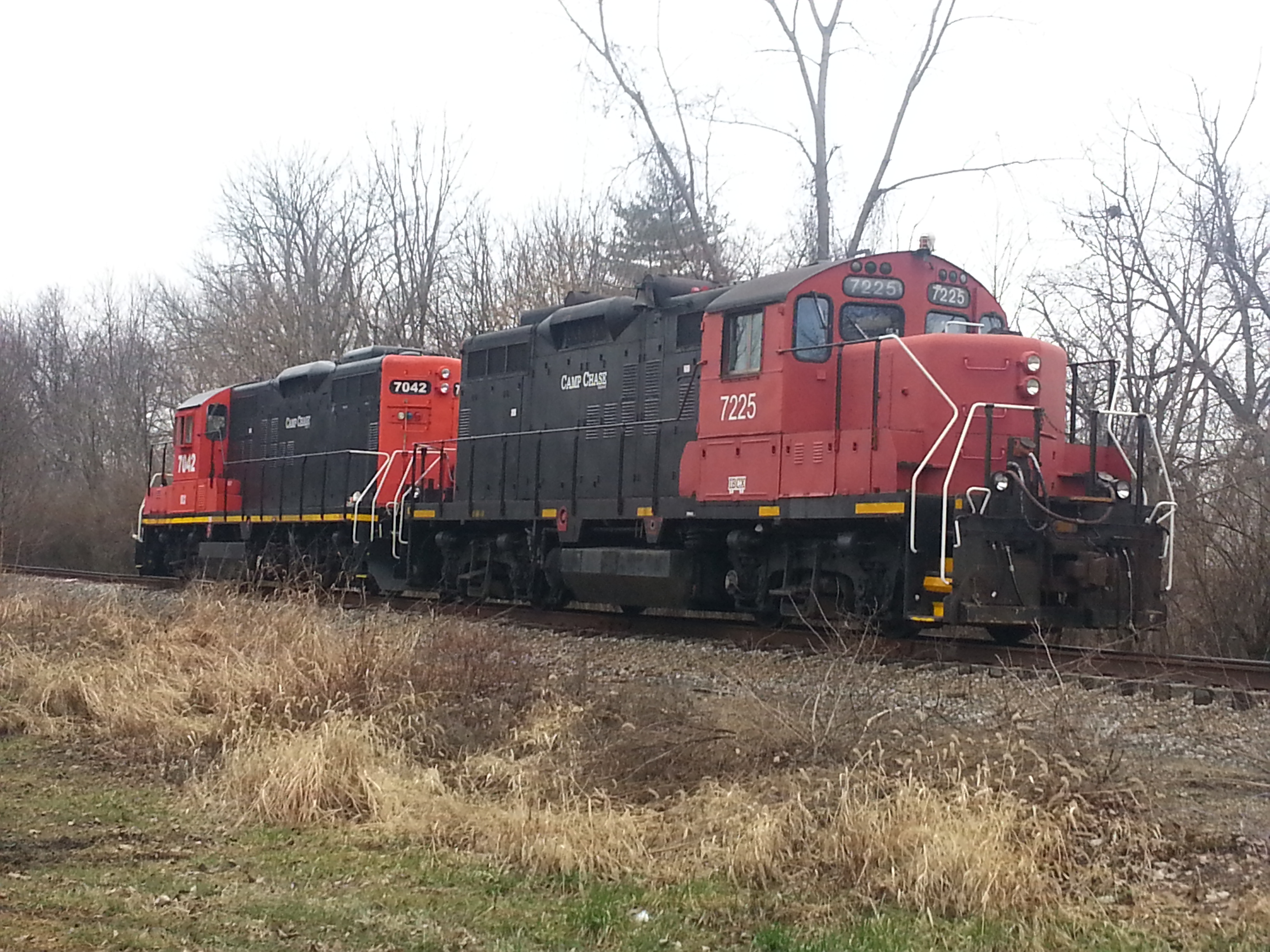
Former Camp Chase Industrial Railroad engine number 7225 in 2017.

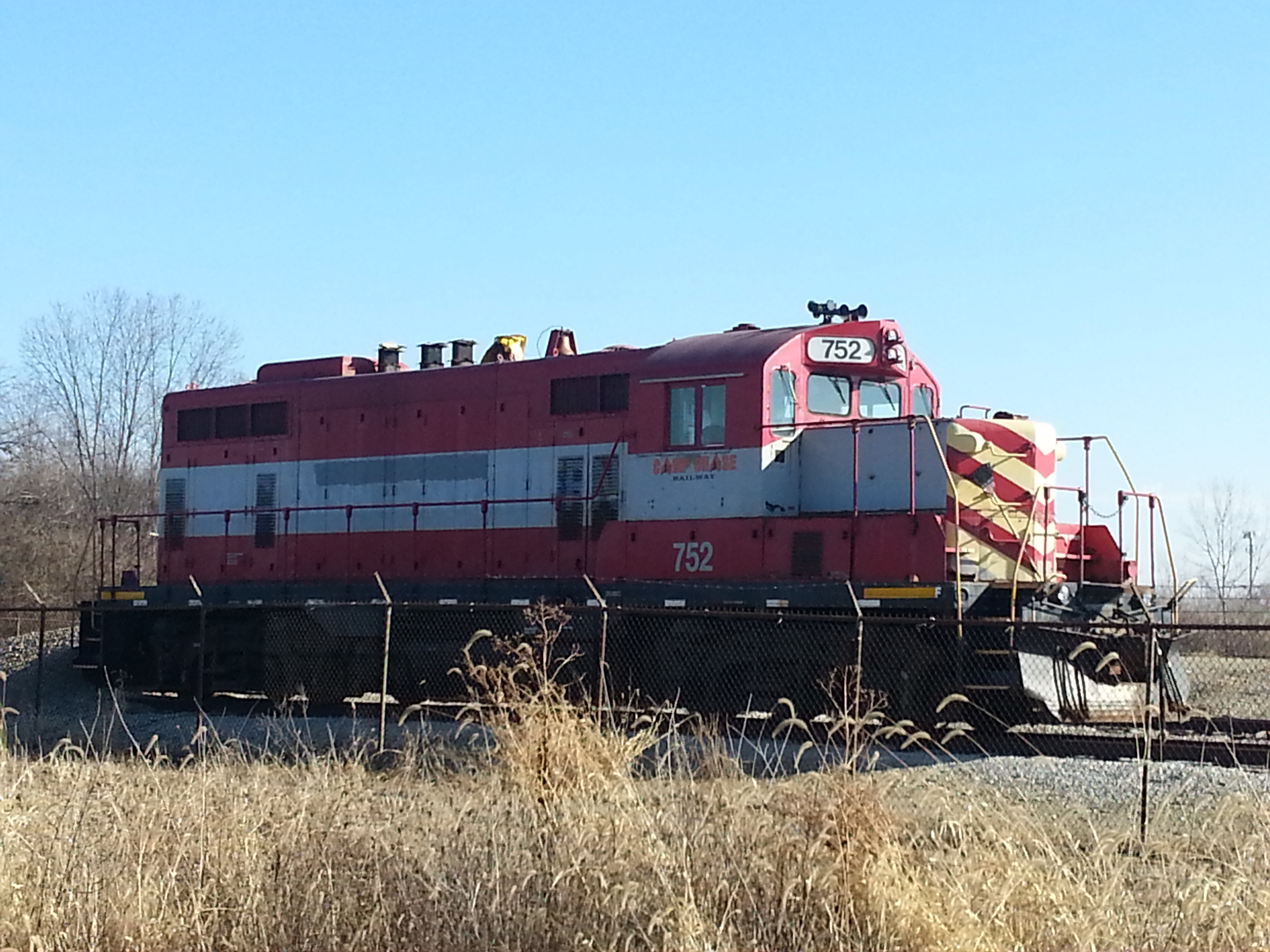
Former Camp Chase Industrial Railroad engine number 752 in 2017.

== Camp Chase Trail ==
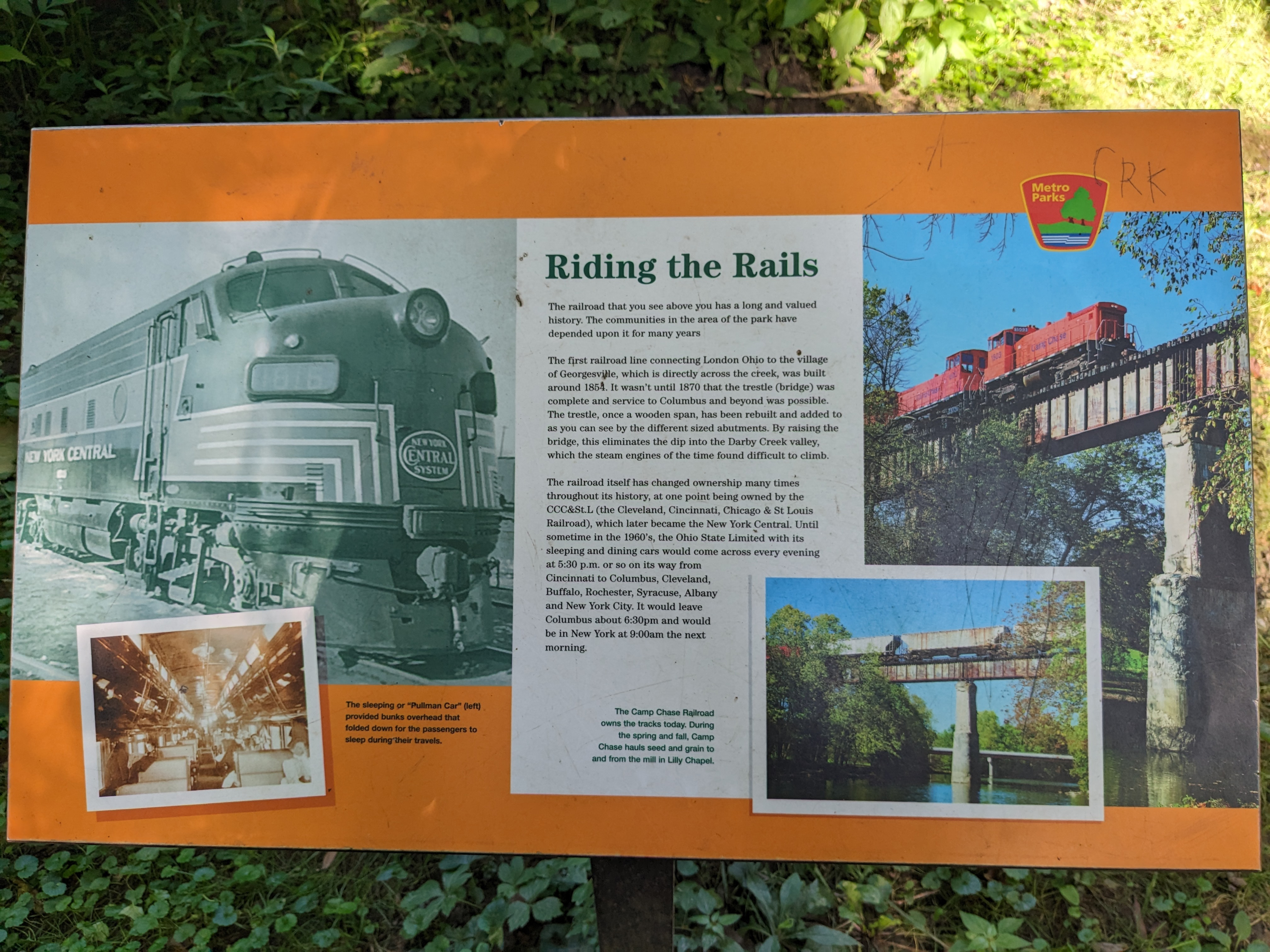
A Metro Parks sign along the Camp Chase Trail detailing the history of the Camp Chase Railway.

The 15-mile (24 km) Camp Chase bike trail follows alongside the railroad except for a short stint along Big Darby Creek and a one-mile diversion along Georgesville Road in Columbus. The trail connects to the larger Ohio to Erie Trail. To create the Camp Chase trail, Columbus and Franklin County Metropolitan Park District worked with the Camp Chase Rail Company to manage the regulations and construction requirements needed to acquire an easement alongside active railroad tracks, finalizing the easement in 2009. The trail was completed in 2015.

The bike trail is one of the few in the United States that is a rails with trails, meaning the trail runs within an active railroad right-of-way. The Camp Chase Trail has more than 12 miles of the bike trail existing within the railroad right-of-way. As of 2018, there were 343 identified rails with trails in the United States, comprising 917 miles of trails in 47 states. By comparison, there are currently 2,404 open rail-trails across the United States comprising a total of 25,723 miles along with 867 rail-trail projects planned for an additional total of 9,147 miles.

A number of design elements separate the twelve-foot-wide trail from the rail line, including fencing, grade separation and ditching. As part of the agreement that resulted in the creation of the Camp Chase bike trail, the trail owners indemnified the railroad company. A bridge built for the bike trail provides a way for pedestrians to cross Interstate 270 instead of trespassing on the railroad bridge, as frequently happened before the trail was built. The trail manager is required to provide the railroad with advance notification of work on the trail and trail maintenance staff "attend railroad safety classes to adequately prepare them for the responsibilities and limitations of working within an active rail corridor."

== See also ==
- Camp Chase
- Camp Chase Trail
