= Olentangy Trail =

Trail in Franklin County, Ohio, United States

- Length: 13.6 mi (21.9 km)
- Location: Franklin County, Ohio
- Trailheads: Columbus, Ohio; 39°57′57″N 83°01′11″W; Worthington, Ohio; 40°07′25″N 83°02′04″W
- Use: Hiking, bicycling, etc.
- Difficulty: Easy
- Season: Year-round
- Sights: Columbus, Ohio

Trail map
- Olentangy Trail map

The Olentangy Trail, also known as the Olentangy Greenway Trail, is a 13.6-mile multi-use greenway trail in Columbus, Ohio, United States. The route is along the banks of the Olentangy River.

The trail connects the Scioto Greenway Trail in downtown Columbus with Worthington Hills Park in Worthington, Ohio.
