= Xenia Station =

Railway station in Ohio, the United States of America

Coordinates: 39.680270°N 83.931345°W

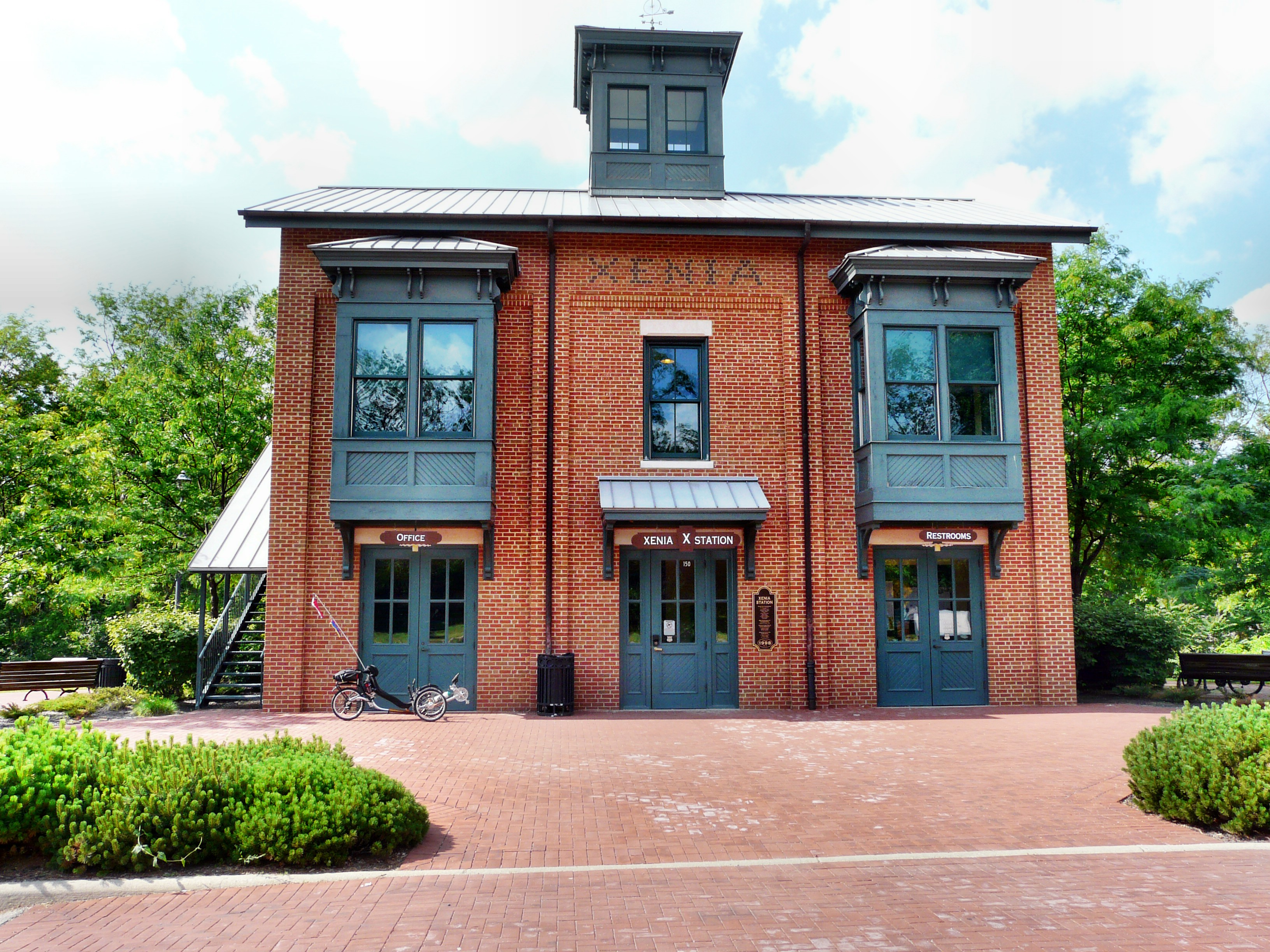
The replica building in 2009

Xenia Station, located at 150 Miami Avenue in Xenia, Ohio, in the United States, is a replica of Xenia's 1880s brick railroad station.

Built in 1998 by the city of Xenia, Xenia Station houses a local history museum, a classroom/meeting space and an observation tower called the Hub Lookout.

Xenia Station is the hub for 5 regional rail trails, two of which are segments of the unfinished Ohio to Erie Trail, which will run from Cincinnati to Cleveland.

== Facilities ==
Xenia Station was designed by Schooley Caldwell Architects in 1998 and custom built for the city of Xenia by a local contractor and is located on a 9-acre (36,000 m^{2}) city park of the same name, which has play equipment, picnic tables, a picnic shelter, nature areas, a splash pad, a caboose and off-street parking. The site is the former PRR freight yards. The building's first floor houses a local history museum which includes railroad memorabilia while the second floor has a classroom/meeting space. Xenia Station is also the hub for 5 regional rail trails, two of which are segments of the unfinished Ohio to Erie Trail, which will run from Cincinnati to Cleveland. In addition to the museum and classroom/meeting space, the building also has restrooms, vending machines and water for the bicyclists, hikers and others who use the park. It also has a large map of the rail trails and the Hub Lookout, which is a tower accessible by spiral staircase that provides a panoramic view of the rail trails.

== Railroad history ==
As late as 1960, Xenia had three rail lines running through it, as follows:

- The Baltimore & Ohio Wellston subdivision, which ran between Washington Court House and Dayton;
- The Pennsylvania Railroad's (PRR) Little Miami branch, between Cincinnati and Springfield: and
- The PRR's Pittsburgh to St. Louis mainline. Amtrak utilized this line for the National Limited until 1979.

All three route saw diminished usage by the early 1980s: each was eventually abandoned and dismantled. PRR's Pittsburgh-St. Louis mainline, owned by Conrail after 1976, remained intact until the late 1980s.

== Rail trails ==
The crossing of the three railroad lines created six spokes on a wheel with Xenia Station in the center. Of these six spokes, five have been converted for interim rail trail use.

The one exception was the B&O line west to Dayton which did not become a trail because it closely paralleled the PRR line to Dayton.

Clockwise from the north, the five trails are:

=== North ===
The northern branch of the Little Miami Scenic Trail runs from Xenia to Yellow Springs and on to Springfield. This is the former PRR line to Springfield.

=== Northeast ===
The Prairie Grass Trail (a part of the Ohio to Erie Trail) runs from Xenia to Cedarville and to London and beyond. Former PRR Pittsburgh-St. Louis mainline east to London and Columbus.

=== East ===
The Xenia-Jamestown Connector will run from Xenia to Jamestown and beyond, but there is now a short gap from Xenia Station to Jasper Road. Former B&O Wellston Subdivision to Chillicothe and Wellston.

=== South ===
The southern branch of the Little Miami Scenic Trail is a part of the Ohio to Erie Trail and runs from Xenia to Milford and beyond. Former PRR line to Cincinnati.

=== West ===
The Creekside Trail, known as the Creekside Recreation Trail in Montgomery County, runs from Xenia to Dayton. Former PRR Pittsburgh-St. Louis mainline to Dayton.

== See also ==
- Columbus and Xenia Railroad
- Little Miami Railroad
