= Scioto Greenway Trail =

Rail trail in Columbus, Ohio, United States

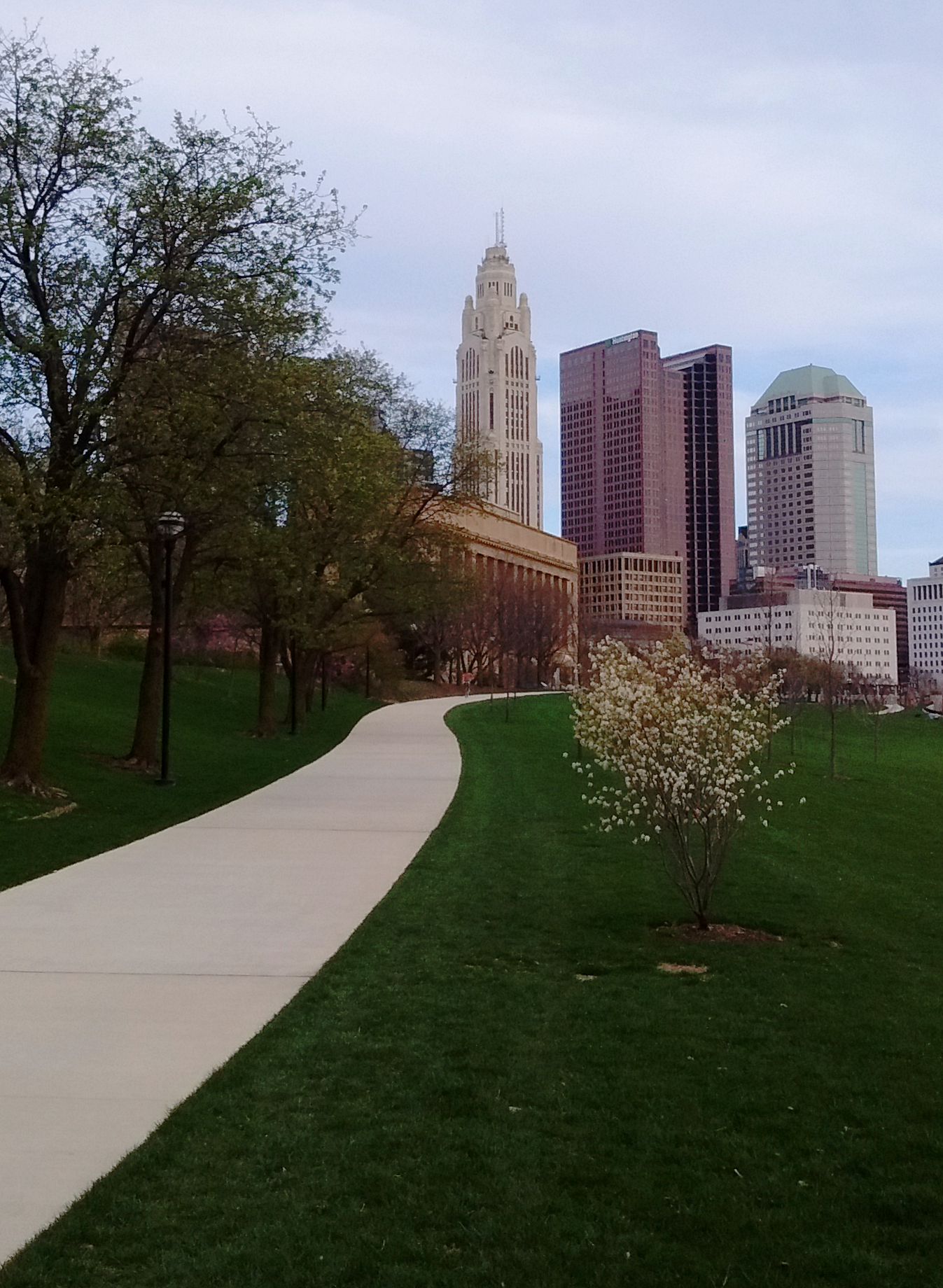
- Scioto Greenway Trail and the Scioto Mile in downtown Columbus, Ohio
- Location: Franklin County, Ohio
- Use: Hiking, bicycling, etc.
- Difficulty: Easy
- Season: Year-round
- Sights: Columbus, Ohio; Scioto Mile; Scioto Audubon Park

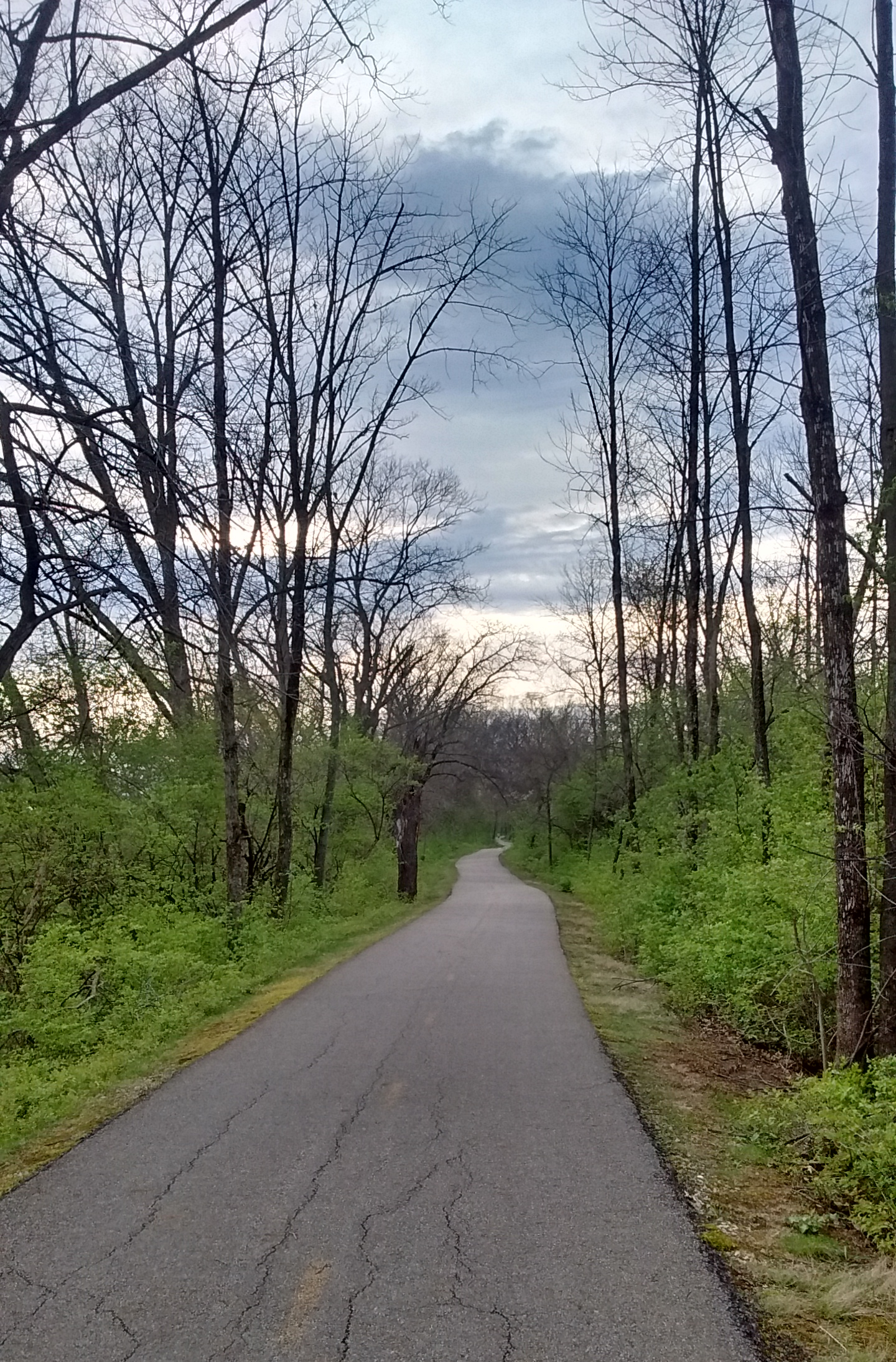
Scioto River Greenway south of Grandview Heights, Ohio

The Scioto Greenway Trail is a multi-use greenway trail in Columbus, Ohio, United States. The route is along the downtown riverfront on the east and west sides of the Scioto River. It is the first such bike trail to have been built in Columbus.

The trail connects Northbank Park to Bicentennial Park in downtown Columbus, forming part of the Scioto Mile, a string of prominent parks and landmarks. South of downtown, the path meanders through The Scioto Audubon Park and has a trailhead at the Grange Insurance Audubon Center. Northwest of downtown, it connects to the northbound Olentangy Trail. In 2013, the Scioto Greenway Trail opened new segments giving access to Grandview Avenue and Fifth Avenue, as well as to the Hilltop Connector Bridge, which continues southwest to the Camp Chase Trail.

The trail is within the Franklin County section of the Ohio to Erie Trail and is also part of U.S. Bicycle Route 50.

== See also ==
- Cultural Arts Center
