= Great American Rail-Trail =

Cross-country hiking and biking trail in the United States

The Great American Rail-Trail
- The Great American Rail-Trail
- Length: 3,700 miles (6,000 km)
- Location: United States
- Trailheads: East: Washington D.C., West: Washington state.
- Use: Hiking, Biking
- Website: Rails to Trails official website

The Great American Rail-Trail is a planned cross-country rail trail in the United States. The trail will run 3,700 miles (6,000 km) between Washington D.C. in the east and the state of Washington in the west. The planned trail is already more than 53% complete, with over 2,000 completed miles on the ground. The trail runs through 12 states and the District of Columbia, (Note: States the trail will cross include Washington, Idaho, Montana, Wyoming, Nebraska, Iowa, Illinois, Indiana, Ohio, Pennsylvania, and Maryland, ending in Washington D.C.) and will be within 50 miles (80 km) of 50 million Americans. The work is being facilitated by Rails-to-Trails Conservancy. The Great American Rail-Trail is composed of over 150 existing multi-use trails with about 90 gaps to be filled. The project was launched in May 2019.

== Route ==
The trail overlaps several long distance rail trails for part or all of their route. From west to east, they include:

- Olympic Discovery Trail, Washington
- Palouse to Cascades State Park Trail, Washington
- Trail of the Coeur d'Alenes, Idaho
- Olympian Trail, Montana
- Headwaters Trail System, Montana
- Casper Rail Trail, Wyoming
- Cowboy Trail, Nebraska
- Cedar Valley Trail, Iowa
- Hennepin Canal Parkway State Park, Illinois
- Illinois and Michigan Canal Trail, Illinois
- Nickel Plate Trail, Indiana
- Cardinal Greenway, Indiana
- Little Miami Scenic Trail, Ohio
- Ohio to Erie Trail, Ohio
- Panhandle Trail, West Virginia
- Great Allegheny Passage, Pennsylvania and Maryland
- C&O Towpath Trail, Maryland
- Capital Crescent Trail, Maryland and D.C.

== See also ==
- Rail trail
- Trail
- Long-distance trail
- EuroVelo
- List of long-distance trails
- Long-distance trails in the United States
- List of rail trails
- State wildlife trails (United States)
- List of longest cross-country trails
- East Coast Greenway
- Empire State Trail
- Katy Trail State Park
