= Rails with trails =

Trails built adjacent to railroads

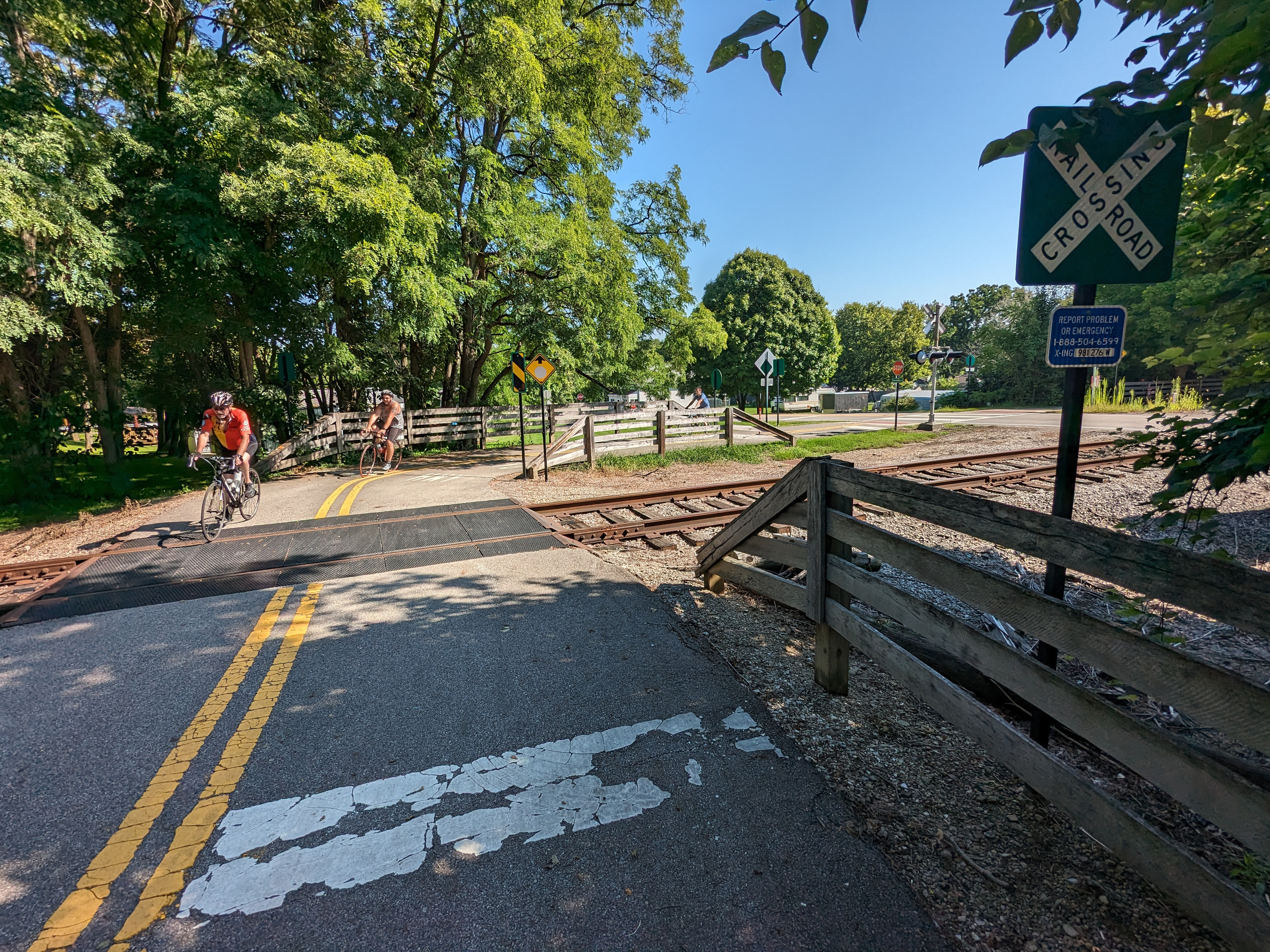
One of the railroad crossings along the Camp Chase Trail, a rails with trail in the United States. The trail has seven crossings, the most of any rails with trails in the U.S.A.

Rails with trails (RWT) are a subset of rail trails in which a railway right-of-way remains in use by trains yet also has a parallel recreational trail. Hundreds of kilometers of RWTs exist in Canada, Europe, the United States, Australia, and the United Arab Emirates.

== Australia ==
Rails with trails in Australia usually exist along publicly owned passenger railways outside of the larger cities. They are called "rail-side trails" and are built on railroad-owned land but managed by local government entities.

== Canada ==
Rails with trails exist in most provinces including Nova Scotia, Québec, Ontario, Saskatchewan, Alberta, and British Columbia. While the length varies, most are relatively short compared to those in the United States, ranging from less than 100 m (330 ft) long to several kilometers. Canadian rails with trails are frequently smaller segments of a longer trail, "with a rails-with-trails portion located on bridges, at choke points, and where the rail corridor was deemed the best alignment for a portion of a trail."

== Europe ==
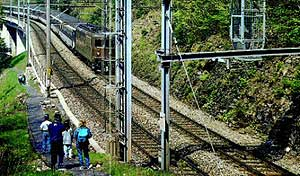
Rail with trail, Switzerland

Some urban bike paths in the Netherlands feature bicycle trails and tracks for trams located side-by-side. And in England and Switzerland, there are also rural routes where intercity trains run parallel to multiuse trails.

== United Arab Emirates ==
While the United Arab Emirates does not have a large number of railroads, rails with trails do exist along rail transit corridors. The Roads and Transport Authority maintains a nine-kilometer bicycle trail alongside the Dubai Tramway that connects stations with Jumeirah Beach and various residential areas.

== United States ==
In 2000, there were 1,000 rail trails in operation nationwide, comprising a total length of about 17,750 km /11,029 mi. Only 60 (387 km/240 mi) were rails with trails, up from 37 (246 km/152 mi) in 1996. Thus, on average United States rail trails in 2000 were 11 miles (18 km) long with a small minority of rails with trails being 4 miles (6.4 km) long.

As of 2018, there were 343 identified rails with trails in the United States, comprising 917 miles of rails-with-trails in 47 states. By comparison, there are currently 2,404 open rail-trails across the United States comprising a total of 25,723 miles along with 867 rail-trail projects planned for an additional total of 9,147 miles.

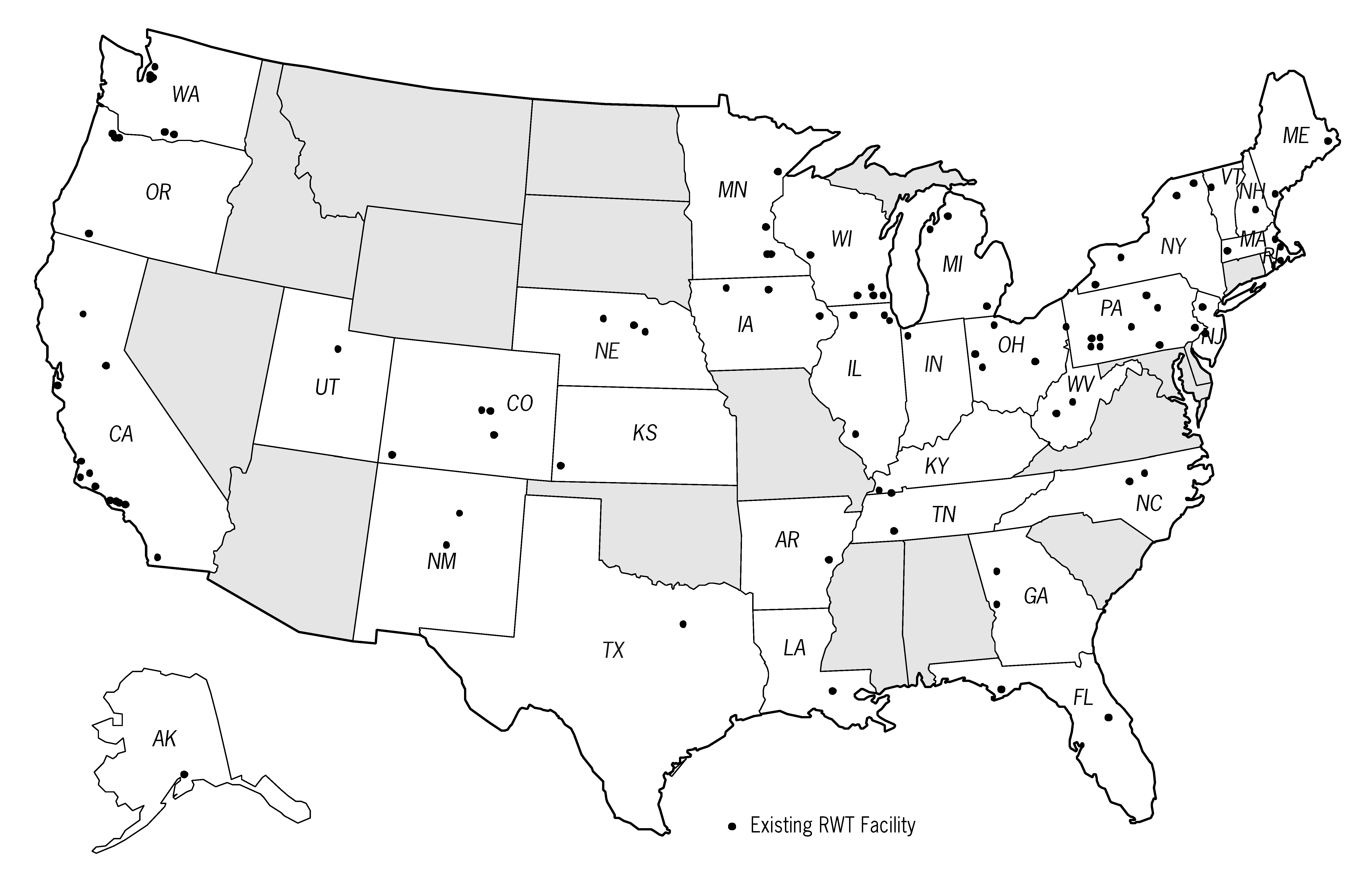
Map of United States Rails-with-Trail existing in 2002.

United States rails with trails with articles on Wikipedia:

- California: Ohlone Greenway, E Line, G Line, Sacramento Southern Railroad (SSRR), Sonoma–Marin Area Rail Transit
- Illinois: Green Bay Trail
- Indiana: Calumet Trail
- Maryland: Western Maryland Scenic Railroad
- Massachusetts: Somerville Community Path Extension
- Minnesota: Cedar Lake Trail, Hiawatha LRT Trail, Kenilworth Trail, Midtown Greenway, Southwest LRT Trail
- New Jersey: Traction Line Recreation Trail, Henry Hudson Trail
- New Mexico: Santa Fe Rail Trail/Santa Fe Southern Railway, Albuquerque Biological Park § Rail line
- Ohio: Camp Chase Trail/Camp Chase Railway
- Pennsylvania: D&L Trail, Five Star Trail, Northern Central Railway of York/York County Heritage Rail Trail, Schuylkill River Trail
- Washington: Burke-Gilman Trail, Pierce County Foothills Trail

== Safety ==
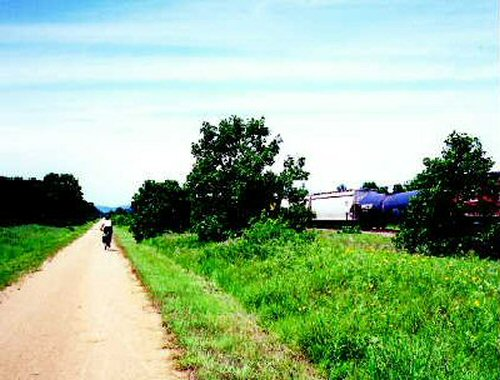
Bicycle and freight train

Rails with trails are considered safe, with a 2013 report from the Rails-to-Trails Conservancy finding only one record of a fatality involving a rail-with-trail user and a train, and just two reports of injury, during a 20-year period in the United States.

A 1997 study of the feasibility of rails with trails identified a need for guidelines concerning RWT crossings, fencing, setbacks, and other items. These guidelines were developed in the form of Rails-with-Trails: Lessons Learned, which finds that "well-designed RWTs meet the operational needs of railroads, often providing benefits in the form of reduced trespassing and dumping. A poorly designed RWT will compromise safety and function for both trail users and the railroad."

A 1996 study of safety on rails with trails in the United States evaluated 37 existing RWTs in 16 states and concluded that "active railroad lines can function with an adjacent pedestrian, horse, and bike path without problem" and RWTs are "no more dangerous than rail-trails alone or next to busy streets."

== See also ==
- Footpath
- Green track
- Linear park
- Sidewalk
- Tunnel of Love (railway)

== Sources ==
- FRA, USDOT (2021). Rails-with-Trails - Best Practices and Lessons Learned. Federal Railroad Administration, U.S. Department of Transportation, FHWA-HEP-21-017.
- Pack, Kelly (2013). America's Rails-with-Trails Report: A Resource for Planners, Agencies and Advocates on Trails Along Active Railroad Corridors. Rails-to-Trails Conservancy.
