= List of longest cross-country trails =

List of trails

This is a list of the longest hiking trails in the world from longest to shortest.

== Trails over 1,500 kilometres in length ==
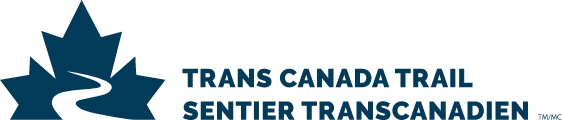
Logo for the Trans-Canada Trail

=== 1. Trans Canada Trail ===
In Canada, this trail extends for over 28,000 km (17,000 mi) from coast to coast. Proposed in 1992 by Bill Pratt and Pierre Camu, the trail reached 100% connection in 2016. The trail has three major "endpoints", those being at Cape Spear in Newfoundland, Tuktoyaktuk in the Northwest Territories, and Vancouver in British Columbia.

=== 2. American Discovery Trail ===
Extending from coast to coast in the US, the Northern Route is about 7,780 km (4,830 mi) and the longer Southern route is 8,138 km (5,057 mi) long. The trail has two notable trailheads, with those being at Cape Henlopen in Delaware and Point Reyes National Seashore in California. The trail splits and reconnects at Elizabethtown, Ohio and Denver Colorado. The trail was first run as a single event by the American Hiking Society from 1980 to 1981, but wasn't fully established as an official trail until it was scouted out and mapped from 1990 to 1991.

Logo for the Sentiero Italia (Left) and the Italian Alpine Club (Right)

=== 3. Grand Italian Trail (Sentiero Italia) ===
In Italy, this trail is estimated to cover over 8,000 km (5,000 mi) in total trail length. The trail was first thought of by Riccardo Carovalini in 1981, but wasn't officially recognized until 1995 for CamminaItalia ("Walk Italy"). The trail starts in San Bartolomeo, Trieste and ends just south of Santa Teresa Gallura, Sardinia.

=== 4. E1 Path ===
Extends from the North Cape of Norway and ends in Sicily, Italy. The route is roughly 7,114 km (4,420 mi) long.

=== 5. Continental Divide Trail ===
Crossing the Rocky Mountains, this USA trail covers about 5,000 km (3,100 mi) in distance, although some argue the numbers are heavily skewed.

=== 6. National Trail ===
In Australia, this trail covers about 5,330 km (3,310 mi) in distance and runs along most of the eastern side of the country, from Cooktown, QLD to Healesville, VIC, crossing the Great Dividing Range.

=== 7. Hokkaidō Nature Trail ===
Located in the Hokkaidō region of Japan, this trail, is expected to be about 4,600 km (2,900 mi) long once it's finished being constructed. Due to not being a well established trail, there is very little information on this trail at the current time. However, information about trail maintenance and construction can be found on the Hokkaidō government site.

=== 8. Tōhoku Nature Trail ===
A trail in Japan about 4,370 km (2,720 mi) long.

=== 9. Pacific Crest Trail ===
Extends from Mexico to Canada, 4,265 km (2,650 mi) through California, Oregon and Washington.

=== 10. Chubu Hokuriku Nature Trail ===
In Japan, about 4,000 km (2,500 mi) long.

=== 11. Great American Rail-Trail ===
A 3,700 miles (6,000 km) cross country rail-trail in the United States.

=== 12. Appalachian Trail ===
This trail is around 3,500 km (2,200 mi) stretching throughout most of the east coastal United States.

=== 13. Kinki Nature Trail ===
In Japan, about 3,300 km (2,100 mi) long.

=== 14. Greater Patagonian Trail ===
In Chile and Argentina is currently 3,000 km (1,900 mi) long and can potentially be extended to approx. 4,000 km (2,500 mi). The entire route network exceeds 15,000 km (9,300 mi).

=== 15. Hexatrek ===
In France, about 3,034 km (1,885 mi).

=== 16. Te Araroa ===
In New Zealand, about 3,000 km (1,900 mi).

=== 17. Kyushu Nature Trail ===
In Japan, about 2,590 km (1,610 mi).

=== 18. Camino de Santiago de Compostela ===
In France and Spain, about 2,500 km (1,600 mi)+ long.

=== 19. The Sultans Trail ===
Runs through Austria, Slovakia, Hungary, Croatia, Serbia, Romania, Bulgaria, Greece, and Turkey at a distance of 2,250 km (1,400 mi).

=== 20. Chugoku Nature Trail ===
In Japan, about 2,200 km (1,400 mi) long.

=== 21. Great Himalaya Trail ===
In the Himalayas near Nepal is a northern route with high elevation, about 1,700 km (1,100 mi). The low route is 1,500 km (930 mi) long with a total of nearly 3,200 km (2,000 mi).

=== 22.Via Francigena ===
Trail in UK, France, and Italy is 1,700 km (1,100 mi).

== Trails under 1,500 kilometres in length ==
- Great Baikal Trail is a series of trails in Russia projected to be finished in 2014.
- The Heysen Trail in South Australia is approximately 1,200 km (750 mi) long, from Cape Jervis in the south, to Parachilna Gorge in the north.
- National Blue Trail in Hungary is 1,168 km (725 mi) long.
- Trans-Panama Trail in Panama is 1,100 km (680 mi) long.
- South West Coast Path in the United Kingdom is around 1,000 km (620 mi).
- Bibbulmun Track in Australia is around 1,000 km (620 mi).
- Israel National Trail or Shvil Yisrael is 1,000 km (620 mi) long.
- The Bruce Trail in Ontario, Canada is 885 km (550 mi) long.
- Cesta hrdinov SNP in Slovakia 770 km (480 mi)
- The Baekdu-Daegan Trail in South Korea is 760 km (470 mi).
- Kom-Emine in Bulgaria is 700 km (430 mi) in length.
- Jordan Trail in Jordan is 650 km (400 mi) long.
- The Sir Samuel and Lady Florence Baker Trail in South Sudan to Uganda is 580 km (360 mi).
- The Lycian Way in Turkey is 540 km (340 mi).
- The Main Beskid Trail in Poland is 496 km (308 mi)
- The Main Sudetes Trail Główny Szlak Sudecki in Poland is 440 km (270 mi)
- Snowman Trek in Bhutan is 347 km (216 mi).
- 3 Ranges Trail in Lesotho is 288.3 km (179.1 mi).
- Tahoe Rim Trail in Lake Tahoe is 250 km (160 mi) long.
- The Santa Fe to Taos Trail in New Mexico is 209 km (130 mi) long.
- Tour de Mont Blanc through France, Italy, and Switzerland is 170 km (110 mi).

== See also ==
- List of longest state highways in the United States
- List of longest tunnels
- Long-distance trail
- Navigation
- Trail
