= Roberts Pass =

American multi-use trail in Ohio

- Location: Madison County, Ohio, US
- Designation: USBR 21 / USBR 50
- Use: Multi-use

Roberts Pass is a paved multi-use trail in Madison County in the U.S. state of Ohio. Along with the Prairie Grass Trail it serves as the Madison County segment of the 330-mile (530 km) Ohio to Erie Trail. The entire length of the Roberts Pass Trail is part of the Great American Rail-Trail, U.S. Bicycle Route 21 and U.S. Bicycle Route 50.

== History ==
Roberts Pass was intended to be included as part of the Prairie Grass Trail. Due to the difficulty of getting right of way, it was thought this section would remain on country roads. As the result of herculean efforts of local volunteers, the right of way was secured and a work lane cleared for later construction. In a local campaign to rename this special section of trail; Bill Young, one of the original members of the Friends of Madison County Parks and Trails, coined the term “Roberts Pass” which were the last names of two of the organization’s leaders.

== Milestones ==
- June 4, 2005 the House of Representatives of the 126th General Assembly of Ohio officially named the trail section "Roberts Pass" in honor of Leaders of Friends of Madison County Parks and Trails, Wayne Roberts and Gene Pass.
- October 2010 Construction was completed on the Roberts Pass Trailhead on the east side of London.

== See also ==
- Camp Chase Trail – Paved multi-use trail in Ohio, U.S.
- Ohio to Erie Trail – Trail in Ohio, USA
