= Lilly Chapel, Ohio =

- Unincorporated community
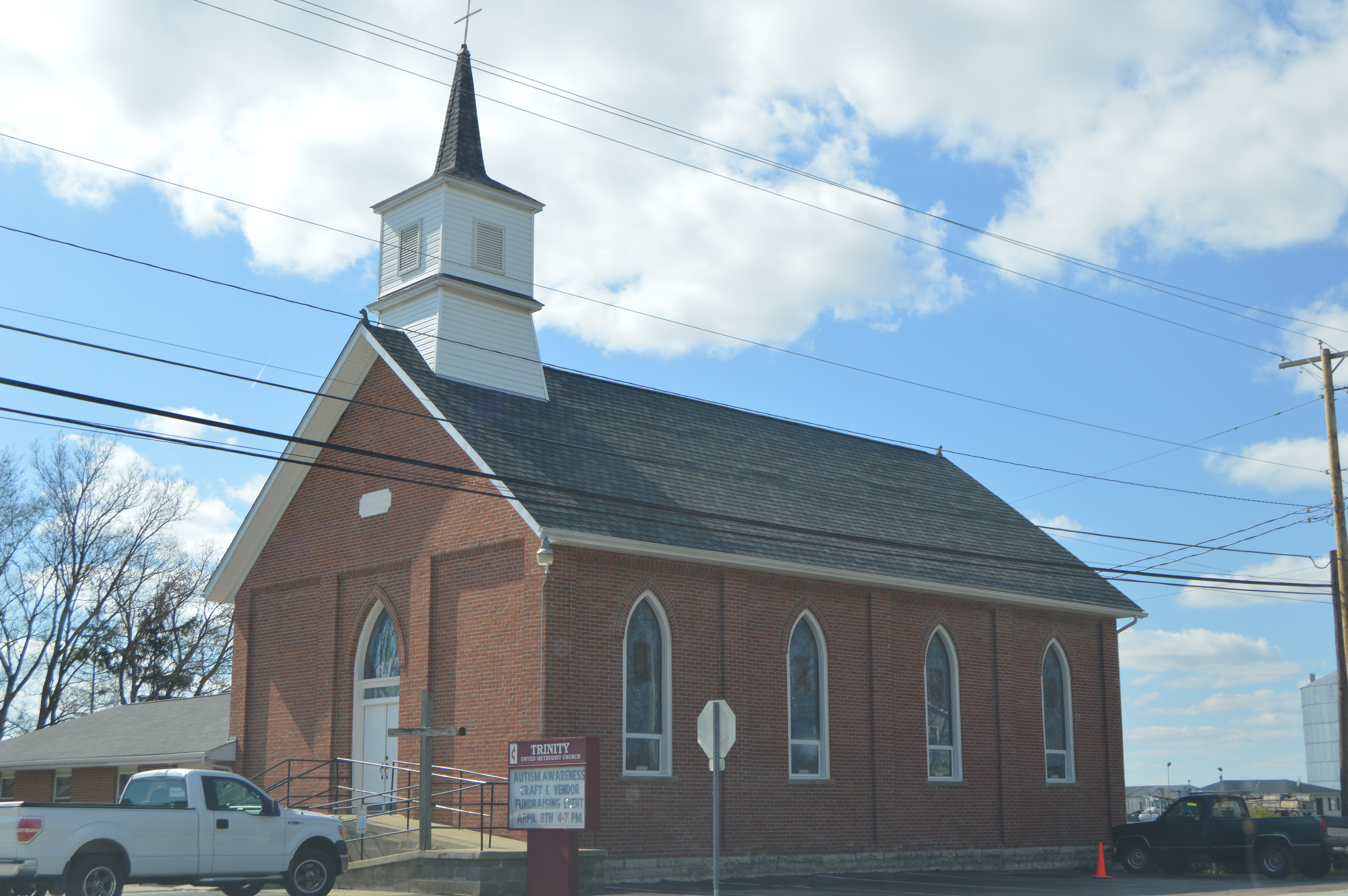
- Trinity United Methodist Church

- Location within Ohio Location within the United States
- Coordinates: 39°53′20″N 83°16′54″W
- Country: United States
- State: Ohio
- County: Madison
- Township: Fairfield
- Elevation: 974 ft (297 m)
- Time zone: UTC-5 (Eastern (EST))
  - Summer (DST): UTC-4 (EDT)
- ZIP Codes: 43140 (London); 43162 (West Jefferson)
- Area code: 614
- GNIS feature ID: 1064995

Lilly Chapel is an unincorporated community in Fairfield Township, Madison County, Ohio, United States. It is located at the intersection of W. Jefferson Kiousville Road and Lilly Chapel Georgesville Road, approximately three miles west of Georgesville.

== History ==
In 1850, a Methodist church was built on land owned by Wesley Lilly, and in recognition of his donation of land, the church was named "Lilly Chapel". At the time, there was no community, although the church did draw many settlers from that part of Union County. In 1871, a Short-line railroad was announced running between Columbus and Springfield, and a store was opened near the church in expectation of the railroad. In 1873, the railroad was completed, and a station was opened and named Lilly Chapel.

The community was laid out on August 28, 1871, by Henry Gilroy and Henry Lilly, and originally named Gilroy. Due to the church and railroad station already being named Lilly Chapel, when Henry Lilly petitioned for a post office, he used that name. The Lilly Chapel Post Office was established April 16, 1873, and the first postmaster was Thomas Horn, who was also the community's first railroad agent. The town's first physician was Dr. Taggart, who moved to Lilly Chapel in 1880, and by 1885, the community contained three general stores, one grocery store, two blacksmith shops, a wagon and buggy shop, two steam sawmills, and two grain elevators. In 1878, a steam-powered tile factory was built. As of 1915, the community contained a bank, two churches, a high school, two general stores, a hardware store, a confectionery, a grain elevator, and a blacksmith. The post office was discontinued on December 31, 1957, and the mail service is now through the West Jefferson branch.

Lilly Chapel is also home to the western terminus of the Camp Chase Railway. The Camp Chase Trail also passes through the town, following along the railroad until the tracks end. The trail then terminates when it intersects Wilson Road (located at 39°57′48.8″N 83°03′59.5″W).

== Demographics ==
As of 1885, the community had a population of 200, and as of 1915, the population was 370.
