= George L. Converse =

American politician

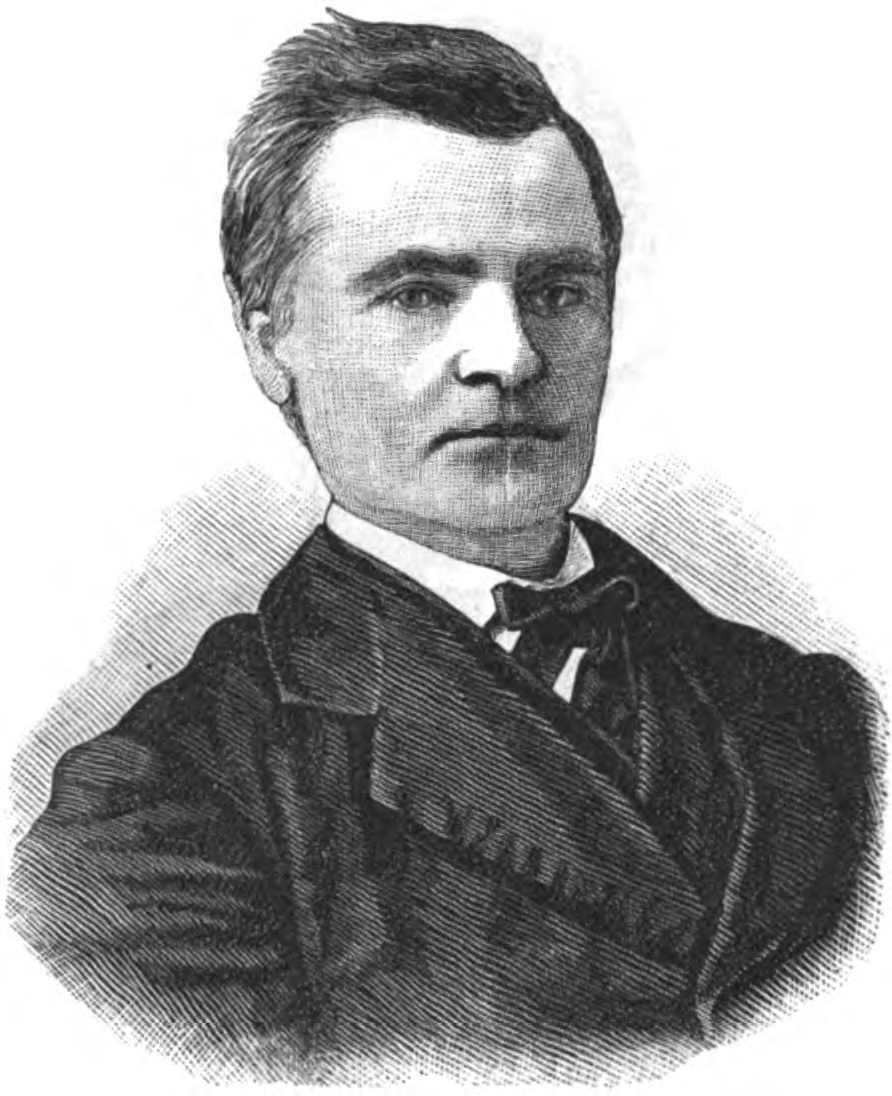

Member of the U.S. House of Representatives from Ohio
- In office March 4, 1879 – March 3, 1885
- Preceded by: John S. Jones
- Succeeded by: Joseph H. Outhwaite
- Constituency: 9th district (1879-1881); 12th district (1881-1883); 13th district (1883-1885)

Personal details
- Born: George Leroy Converse; June 4, 1827 Georgesville, Ohio, U.S.
- Died: March 30, 1897 (aged 69) Columbus, Ohio, U.S.
- Resting place: Green Lawn Cemetery
- Party: Democratic
- Education: Ohio Central College; Denison University
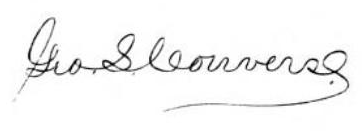
- Signature

George Leroy Converse (June 4, 1827 – March 30, 1897) was an American lawyer and politician who served three terms as a U.S. representative from Ohio, representing three different districts from 1879 to 1885.

== Life and career ==
Born in Georgesville, Ohio, Converse attended the common schools and Ohio Central College, and was graduated from Denison University, Granville, Ohio, in 1849. He studied law. He was admitted to the bar in 1851 and commenced practice in Columbus, Ohio, in 1852.

=== Early career ===
He served as prosecuting attorney of Franklin County in 1857. He served as member of the State house of representatives from 1860 to 1863 and from 1874 to 1876 and speaker of the house in 1874. He served as member of the State senate in 1864 and 1865.

=== Congress ===
Converse was elected as a Democrat to the Forty-sixth, Forty-seventh, and Forty-eighth Congresses (March 4, 1879 – March 3, 1885). He served as chairman of the Committee on Public Lands (Forty-sixth Congress). He was not a candidate for renomination in 1884 to the Forty-ninth Congress.

=== Later career ===
He resumed the practice of law and served as delegate to the Nicaraguan Canal Convention in 1892, and made chairman of this and the subsequent convention held in New Orleans.

== Death ==
He died in Columbus, Ohio, March 30, 1897. He was interred in Green Lawn Cemetery there.

== Sources ==
- United States Congress. "George L. Converse (id: C000711)". Biographical Directory of the United States Congress.

U.S. House of Representatives
Preceded by John S. Jones	United States Representative from Ohio's 9th congressional district March 4, 1879–March 3, 1881	Succeeded by James S. Robinson
Preceded by Henry S. Neal	United States Representative from Ohio's 12th congressional district March 4, 1881–March 3, 1883	Succeeded by Alphonso Hart
Preceded by Gibson Atherton	United States Representative from Ohio's 13th congressional district March 4, 1883–March 3, 1885	Succeeded by Joseph H. Outhwaite
Ohio House of Representatives
Preceded by Otto Dressel, John G. Edwards	Representative from Franklin County; January 2, 1860-January 3, 1864; Served alongside: Benjamin L. Reese, Otto Dressel	Succeeded by Otto Dressel, John G. Edwards
Preceded by William L. Ross, Clark White	Representative from Franklin County; January 5, 1874-January 6, 1878; Served alongside: John H. Heitman, John C. Groom	Succeeded by Henry J. Booth, Clark White
Preceded by Nelson H. Van Vorhes	Speakers of the House; January 5, 1874-January 2, 1876	Succeeded by Charles H. Grosvenor
Ohio Senate
Preceded by Augustus L. Perrill	Senator from 10th District; January 4, 1864-December 31, 1865	Succeeded by Ansel T. Walling
