= Border, Utah =

Unincorporated community in the state of Utah, United States

- Unincorporated community
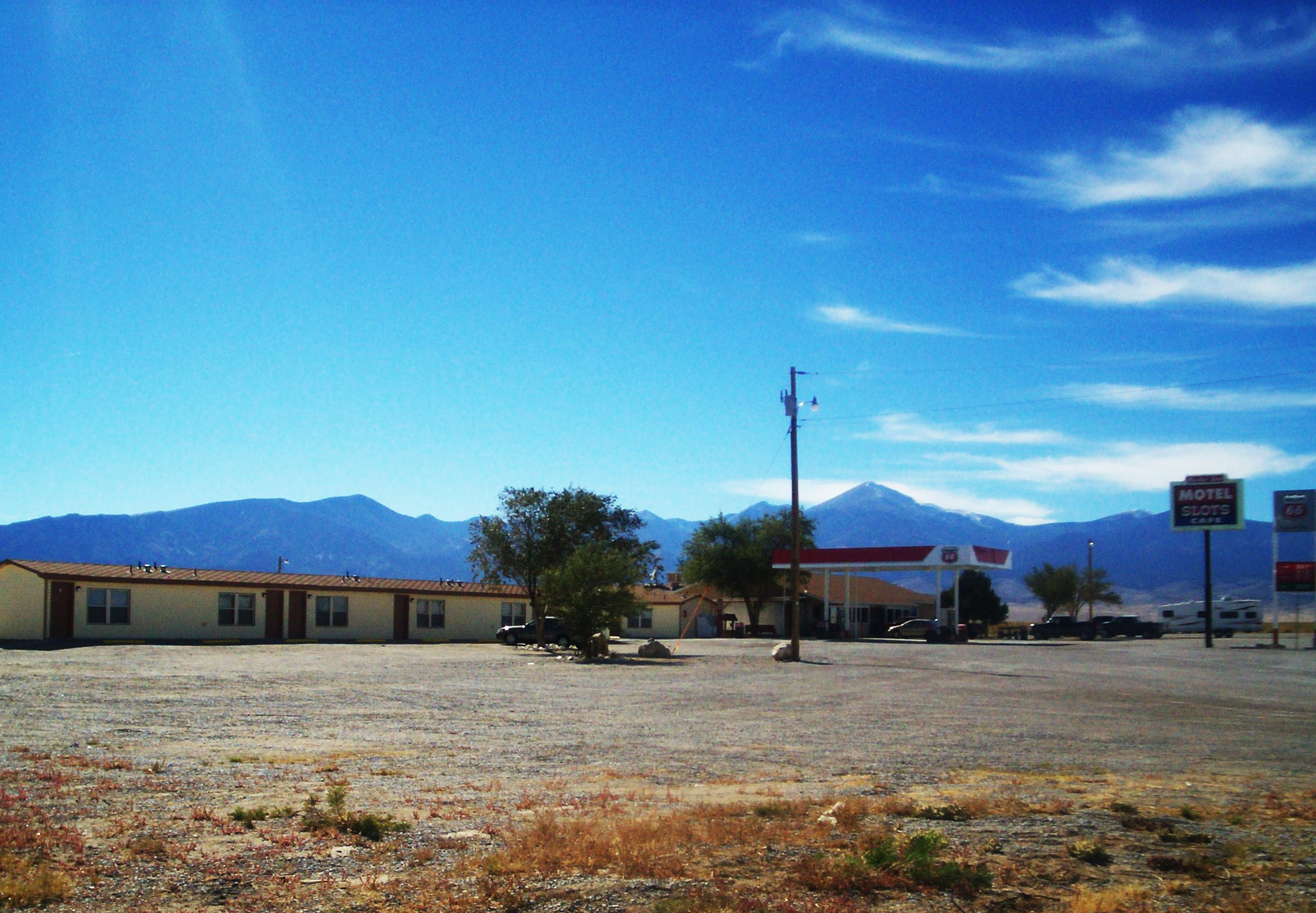
- Motel in Border, October 2007
- Etymology: Nevada-Utah border
- Location of Border within the State of Utah
- Coordinates: 39°03′24″N 114°02′57″W
- Country: United States
- State: Utah
- County: Millard County
- Time zone: UTC-7 (Mountain (MST))
  - Summer (DST): UTC-6 (MDT)
- ZIP code: 84728

Border is an unincorporated community on the western edge of Millard County, Utah, United States, on the Nevada state line. The community is located 88 miles (142 km) west of Delta, Utah and 64 miles (103 km) east of Ely, Nevada. U.S. Route 6/U.S. Route 50 passes through the community.
