= Rails-to-Trails Conservancy =

American non-profit organization

- Formation: February 1, 1986; 40 years ago
- Founder: Peter Harnik; David Burwell
- Legal status: Nonprofit organization
- Headquarters: Washington, D.C.
- President: Ryan Chao
- Website: railstotrails.org

Rails-to-Trails Conservancy (RTC) is an American nonprofit organization based in Washington, D.C., that works with communities to preserve unused rail corridors by transforming them into rail trails within the United States.

== History ==
RTC was formed in 1986 by Peter Harnik and David Burwell. Early federal support for trail conversion began with the Railroad Revitalization and Regulatory Reform Act of 1976 (known as the 4R Act), which provided funding, information exchange, and technical assistance to preserve disused corridors for public trails. The movement was further accelerated by a 1983 amendment to the National Trails System Act, known as the Rails-to-Trails Act, which established the legal mechanism known as "railbanking." This legislation allowed out-of-service railroad corridors to be converted into trails on an interim basis, preserving them in public ownership rather than allowing them to be permanently abandoned and dismantled. In addition to the creation of public rail trails, railbanking legally preserves the corridors so that rail service can be reactivated along them in the future.

In August 2000, RTC launched TrailLink, a trail-finder website and mobile application featuring maps, photos, and reviews of U.S. rail trails and greenways. Since its launch, the platform has mapped tens of thousands of miles of trails using geographic information system (GIS) data to aid outdoor recreation and route planning.

In 2007, RTC established the Rail-Trail Hall of Fame to recognize multi-use trails across the country. Inductees are selected based on traits such as scenic value, high usage, amenities, and community integration. The initial inductees included the Great Allegheny Passage in Pennsylvania and Maryland, the Fred Marquis Pinellas Trail in Florida, and Katy Trail State Park in Missouri. By 2025, the honor expanded to include alternative multi-use paths like towpaths and greenways, with Kansas's Flint Hills Trail State Park being inducted following a national public vote.

In 2019, RTC announced plans for the Great American Rail-Trail, a continuous multi-use pedestrian and bicycle trail spanning over 3,700 miles between Washington, D.C., and Washington state. The project aims to connect existing local paths across 12 states and the District of Columbia, closing remaining trail gaps along the preferred route.

The organization's history and impact were profiled in a public broadcasting documentary titled From Rails to Trails, which aired nationally on PBS in October 2025.

== See also ==
- Rails with trails
