= Ohio to Erie Trail =

Trail in Ohio, USA

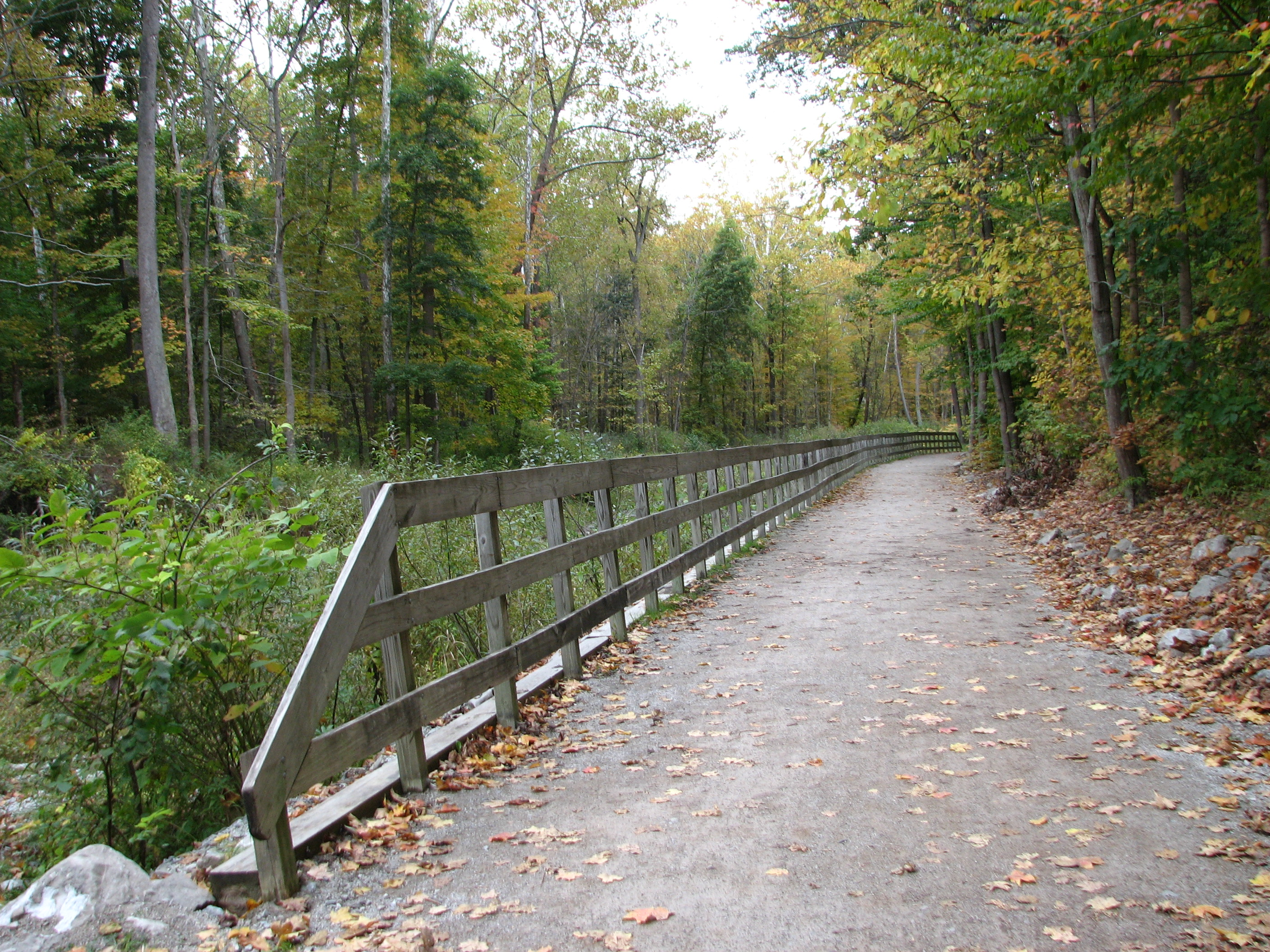
- Ohio and Erie Canal Towpath Trail, located in the Cuyahoga Valley National Park
- Length: 326 mi (525 km)
- Location: Ohio, United States
- Designation: State Bike Route 1; USBR 25 (Cincinnati); USBR 21 (Cincinnati–Cleveland); State Bike Route 3 (Cincinnati–Xenia); USBR 50 (Xenia–Columbus); USBR 44 (Wooster–Massillon)
- Trailheads: Cincinnati to Cleveland (numerous)
- Use: Biking, Hiking, Horseback Riding, Jogging, Running
- Season: Year-round
- Sights: Numerous sights
- Surface: Asphalt, Cement, Concrete, Crushed Limestone, Hard–Packed Earth
- Website: ohiotoerietrail.org

The Ohio to Erie Trail is a dedicated multi-use trail crossing Ohio from southwest to northeast, crossing 326 mi (525 km) of regional parks, nature preserves, and rural woodland.

The trail, named after its endpoints, extends from the Ohio River at Cincinnati to the Lake Erie at Cleveland, primarily integrating former rail trails and multi-use trails into a dedicated trail.

Roughly 91% complete as of December 2025, construction began in 1991, with sections completed as recently as 2025.

Remaining on-road segments, designated as routes, substitute for the as yet undeveloped final sections of fully-segregated, dedicated path.

The trail serves a variety of user types. Non-motorized movement includes: bicyclists, pedestrians, hikers, and — on certain sections — horse riders or drivers. In addition, certain e-bikes are allowed on the trail, type 1 and 2 only.

The surface itself varies, including asphalt, concrete, crushed limestone and short sections of hard-packed earth.

== History ==
The Ohio to Erie Trail began in 1991 as an outgrowth of the Ohio Bicycle Advisory Council, and was envisioned that year by Edward Franklin Honton, a former Franklin County engineer, who subsequently founded and served as president of a non-profit organization dedicated to developing the trail. After his death in 2005, his legacy continued through the organization he founded, The Ohio to Erie Trail Fund. The historic Bridgeview Bridge was dedicated in Honton's memory at the opening of the Alum Creek Trail near Innis Park on July 15, 2011. The bridge is a fully restored 1902 structure which originally carried Beach Road and Lucas Road over the Big Darby Creek.

Leadership of the organization consists of volunteer board members and paid staff.

=== Board Presidents chronological list ===
- 1991 - 2004: Ed Honton, Founder
- 2005 - 2017: Dr. Tom Moffitt
- 2018: Bill Daehler
- 2019 - 2022: Mike Groeber
- 2023 - Present: Tom Bilcze

=== Professional Staff chronological list ===
- 2004 - 2013: Jerry Rampelt
- 2014 - 2015: Julie Van Winkle
- 2016 - 2021: Lisa Daris
- 2022 - 2025: Jody Dzuranin
- 2026 - Present: Alan Weinstein

== Path ==
The trail is divided into three main sections.

- Northern: Cleveland to Millersburg
- Central: Millersburg to Galloway in SW Franklin County
- Southern: Galloway in SW Franklin County to Cincinnati

The trail passes through regional parks, nature preserves, and other rural woodland. As of December 2025, 30 miles or 9% of the path was still on city streets or rural roads, awaiting conversion to paved off-street trails.

== Trailheads and access points ==
South to North:

SOUTHERN SECTION

- Cincinnati, Smale Riverfront Park
- Cincinnati, Sawyer Point Park
- Cincinnati, Corbin St.
- Cincinnati, Wilmer Ave, Lunken Airfield
- Cincinnati, Avoca Park
- Terrace Park, Elm Ave.
- Milford, Terrell Park
- Milford, near Mill St and Rt 50
- Loveland, Miami Riverview Park
- Loveland, Nisbet Park
- Maineville, Grandin Rd.
- South Lebanon, Railroad St.
- Morrow, Front St.
- Oregonia, Oregonia Rd.
- Corwin/Waynesville, Corwin Rd and O'Neall Rd.
- Spring Valley, W. Main St.
- Xenia, Xenia Station, S. Miami Ave, optional spur to Yellow Springs.
- Wilberforce, via Lewis Trail
- Cedarville, S. Miller St.
- Selma, Selma Pike
- South Charleston, W. Mound St.
- South Charleston, S Church St.
- London, Madison County Senior Center
- London, Midway St.
- London, S. Walnut St.
- London, Maple St.
- London, E. Center St
- Battelle Darby Creek Metro Park, 8465 Alkire Rd (Overnight parking allowed)
- Battelle Darby Creek Metro Park, 2705 Darby Creek Dr.
- Galloway, Alton Rd

CENTRAL SECTION

- Columbus/Galloway, O'Harra Rd.
- Columbus, Norton Rd. at RRx
- Columbus, near Countrybrook W. Dr.
- Columbus, Georgesville Rd.
- Columbus, Wilson Rd Park
- Columbus, Derrer Rd.
- Columbus, N. Sylvan Ave at RRx
- Columbus, N. Hague Ave at RRx
- Columbus, N. Eureka Ave at RRx
- Columbus, McKinley Ave.
- Columbus, Grandview Ave.
- Columbus, N. Souder Ave.
- Columbus, North Bank Park
- Columbus, McFerson Commons Park
- Columbus, Fort Hayes, Jack Gibbs Blvd.
- Columbus, Taylor Ave at Leonard Ave.
- Columbus, Avalon Park
- Columbus, Hayden Park
- Columbus, Ohio Dominican, Airport Dr.
- Columbus, Sunbury Ridge Dr.
- Columbus, Innis Park
- Columbus, Easton Way and Sunbury Rd.
- Columbus, Morse Rd.
- Columbus, Parkridge Park
- Columbus, Strawberry Farms Park
- Columbus, Casto Park
- Columbus, Cooper Park
- Columbus, Emerick Rd.
- Westerville, W. Schrock Rd.(east of Alum Creek)
- Westerville, Hanby Park
- Westerville, County Line Rd (use trail bridge)
- Westerville, Hoff Rd.
- Genoa Township, Gateway Park
- Genoa Township, McNamara Park
- Genoa Township, near Char-Mar Ridge Preserve
- Galena, Hoover Scenic Trail, Plumb Rd
- Galena, Miller Park, Walnut St.
- Sunbury, Sandel Legacy, 168 S. Vernon St.
- Sunbury, east of JR Smith Park on Cherry St.
- Centerburg, Newell Recreation Preserve
- Centerburg, N. Clayton Rd. near the trail's MidPoint and High Point markers
- Mt Liberty, Simmons Church Rd.
- Bangs, Johnstown Rd.
- Mount Vernon, Ariel-Foundation Park
- Mount Vernon, CA&C Depot, 1 Columbus St.
- Gambier, Meadow Lane.
- Howard, Rotary Park on Station Rd.
- Danville, Richards St.
- Danville, 402 East St.
- Brinkhaven, Bridge of Dreams
- Glenmont, near Clifton St and Galatian St.
- Killbuck, near S. Water St and W. Front St.

NORTHERN SECTION

- Millersburg, Hipp Station, 62 N. Grant St.
- Holmesville, Benton Rd.
- Fredericksburg, Fredericksburg Community Park
- Apple Creek, Apple Creek Park
- Dalton, Dalton Village Park
- Massillon, 135 Lake Ave NW.
- Massillon, Bridgeport Quarry
- Massillon, Forty Corners
- Canal Fulton, Crystal Springs
- Canal Fulton, 5513 Butterbridge Rd NW.
- Canal Fulton, Lock 4, 6575 Erie Ave NW.
- Canal Fulton, Helena Heritage Park
- Canal Fulton, Lake Lucerne
- Clinton, 2749 North St.
- New Franklin, 2328 Center Rd
- New Franklin, 2445 Vanderhoof Rd.
- Barberton, Wolf Creek, 33 Snyder Ave.
- Barberton, Magic Mile, 67 Robinson Ave.
- Barberton, 5 Fairview Ave.
- Akron, 2740 Manchester Rd.
- Akron, 380 W Wilbeth Rd.
- Akron, Summit Lake Nature Center
- Akron, Summit Lake, 380 W Crosier St.
- Akron, Richard Howe House. 47 W Exchange St.
- Akron, Lock 3, 200 S Main St.
- Akron, 155 Beech St.
- Akron, Mustill Store
- Akron, 499 Memorial Pkwy.
- Akron, Big Bend, 1337 Merriman Rd.
- Akron, 1431 North Portage Path
- Akron, Botzum, 2928 Riverview Rd.
- Peninsula, Ira, 3801 Riverview Rd.
- Peninsula, Indigo Lake
- Peninsula, Hunt House, 2054 Bolanz Rd.
- Peninsula, Deep Lock Quarry
- Peninsula, Lock 29, 1648 Mill St.
- Boston, 1508 Boston Mills Rd.
- Sagamore Hills, Red Lock, 1175 Highland Rd.
- Brecksville, Station Road Bridge
- Valley View, Frazee House
- Brecksville, 7359 Fitzwater Rd
- Valley View, Canal Exploration Center
- Independence, Lockhead 39, Rockside Rd.
- Valley View, Thornburg Station
- Valley View, 5650 West Canal Rd.
- Garfield Heights, Bacci Park/Aqueduct OH
- Cuyahoga Heights, CanalWay Center, 4524 East 49th St.
- Cleveland, 997 Harvard Avenue
- Cleveland, Steelyard Commons
- Cleveland, Clark Field, 871 Clark Ave.
- Cleveland, Sokolowski's Overlook, 1203 University Rd.
- Cleveland, Scranton Flats
- Cleveland, Wendy Park
- Cleveland, Edgewater Park

== See also ==
- List of rail trails
- Little Miami Scenic Trail
- Xenia Station
- Prairie Grass Trail
- Roberts Pass
- Camp Chase Trail
- Scioto Greenway Trail
- Columbus Downtown Connector Trail
- Alum Creek Greenway Trail
- Westerville Bike trail
- Genoa & Galena Trail
- Heart of Ohio Trail
- Kokosing Gap Trail
- Holmes County Trail
- Sippo Valley Trail
- Ohio & Erie Canal Towpath Trail
- Centennial Lake Link Trail
- Cleveland Lakefront Bikeway
