= Global Alliance for EcoMobility =

EcoMobility Alliance
- Founded: 2011 in Changwon, Korea (Global Alliance for Ecomobility was founded in 2007 in Bali)
- Type: Non-governmental organization
- Purpose: Environment and transport
- Location: Bonn, Germany (International)
- Region served: Worldwide
- Method: Direct action, advocacy, research, innovation
- Website: www.ecomobility.org

The EcoMobility Alliance is a global, cross-sectoral partnership for the affirmation of EcoMobility i.e. the integrated promotion of walking, cycling, wheeling and passenging. The Alliance promotes EcoMobility for the purpose of mobility and accessibility for all, health, clean air, noise avoidance, energy efficiency, greenhouse gas emission reduction and individual cost savings, and thus as an opportunity for sustainable urban development.

The EcoMobility Alliance was created in October 2011 in Changwon, Korea. It is a transformation of the earlier Global Alliance for EcoMobility, which is a non-governmental organization founded and launched in Bali on 10 December 2007, on the occasion of the 2007 United Nations Climate Change Conference (UNFCCC-COP-13).

The EcoMobility Alliance has defined itself as a "global" actor because of both the origin and nature of its members and its geographical scope. It aims at engaging public and private actors from different sectors and segments from all over the world, as well as promoting and advocating for EcoMobility at a global level, both in industrialized and developing countries.

== Definition ==
The EcoMobility Alliance defines 'EcoMobility' as an integrated form of environmentally sustainable mobility that combines the use of non motorized means of transport with the use of public transport to allow people to move in their local environments without utilizing privately owned motor vehicles.

Non motorized means of transport include:
walking - cycling - wheeling: walking, using the bicycles, tricycle, velomobile, wheelchairs, mobility scooter, walking aids, scooters, skates, push scooters, trailer, hand carts, shopping carts/trolleys, carrying aids and the above vehicles with supporting electrical drive (preferably powered by renewables);

The use of public transport is referred to as “passenging” and includes:
the use of buses, trams, subways, light rail, trains, ferries, collective taxis and taxis (if low-emission)

== Origins of the word 'EcoMobility' ==
The word EcoMobility was first coined by Konrad Otto-Zimmermann, Secretary General of ICLEI and of the Global Alliance for EcoMobility, in February 2007. It is the English equivalent of the German word 'Umweltverbund', first used by Otto-Zimmermann at the end of the 1980s while working on a project promoting the integrated use of "environmentally friendly" modes of transport, and more specifically walking, cycling and public transport.

The word 'Umweltverbund' quickly caught the attention of transport professionals and gained prominence within the field. With over several years of experience in the field of environmental protection, urban planning and sustainable transport, Otto-Zimmermann was determined that a new word was needed to define collectively compound means of transport, excluding cars, lorries and planes. Subsequently, the word 'EcoMobility' was created with the intent of being self-explanatory and aiming to catch the attention of stakeholders in various sectors and becoming part of their daily activities and vocabulary.

Currently the word 'EcoMobility' is still a rarely used term, with the notable exception of the Government of Canada, which has engaged in the reduction of emissions from urban passenger transport, launching an "ecoMobility Program". The Government of Canada is one of the few actors who have used the word "EcoMobility" in the context and with the connotation originally meant by Otto-Zimmermann. The French Railway company SNCF has also engaged in the affirmation of Ecomobility, intending it as 'environmentally-friendly, sustainable travel' that is cheaper, easier, more accessible and more efficient thanks to door-to-door travel involving train + tram, bike, car-sharing or 'segway' electric two-wheelers. The promotion of EcoMobility is also at the core of the activities of the Global Alliance for EcoMobility, which aims at spreading the idea and practice of EcoMobility amongst users, the business, policy makers and experts.

== Members ==
The EcoMobility Alliance membership consists of leading global and regional-level organizations representing four different categories of stakeholders, that is policy makers, professional expertise, production-trade-services, users. The four different segments in which the EcoMobility Alliance is active - walking, cycling, wheeling and passenging – are represented in its membership. The different nature of the members is considered by them as a crucial element to secure a balanced and fair representation, a deeper exchange of ideas and expertise and real integration among the various segments.

Currently, the Global Alliance for EcoMobility includes the following members:

Business

- Accell Group
- Chariot Carriers
- COLIBI
- COLIPED
- Dahon
- Denk Engineering
- European Twowheel Retailers' Association (ETRA)
- Giant
- UITP - International Association of Public Transport
- International Federation of Bike Messengers (IFBMA)
- Intrago Corporation
- New York City Pedicab Owners Association (NYCPOA)
- Shimano
- Trek
- Ultra Motor

Experts

- BEN Bikes
- Clean Air Initiative Asia Center (CAI-Asia)
- FIA Foundation
- Urban Transport Project (SUTP)
- Interface for Cycling Expertise
- Institute for Transportation and Development Policy (ITDP)
- Institute for Transportation and Development Policy-Europe (ITDP-Europe)
- ISOCARP - International Society of City and Regional Planners
- Research and Transformation Sustainable Mobility and Accessibility (SMART, University of Michigan)

Governments

- ICLEI - Local Governments for Sustainability
- UNEP - United Nations Environment Programme
- UN-HABITAT - United Nations Human Settlements Programme

Users

- Active Transportation Alliance
- Bicycle Federation of Australia (BFA)
- European Cyclists' Federation (ECF)
- European Passengers' Federation (EPF)
- League of American Bicyclists

== Organizational structure ==
The governing structure of the EcoMobility Alliance is constituted by four bodies:

1. Alliance Assembly
2. Steering Group
3. Secretariat
4. Working Groups

=== Alliance Assembly ===
The Alliance Assembly is the EcoMobility Alliance's supreme body and all Members are represented. Its role is: a) to establish and modify the terms of Reference; b) to approve the composition of the Steering Group; c) to approve the annual budget; d) to approve the annual Financial Report; e) to approve the five-year strategy proposed by the Steering Group; f) to approve progress reports submitted by the Working Groups.

The Alliance Assembly normally convenes once a year, but an extraordinary meeting is contemplated if requested by at least one quarter of the Full Members. Decisions within the Alliance Assembly are taken by absolute majority and each Full Member has a vote. Associate Members and Individual Members may only participate in the Assembly in an advisory role, without voting status.

=== Steering Group ===
The Steering Group is the EcoMobility Alliance's decision-making body between the Alliance Assembly meetings. It is constituted by five to fifteen delegates of the Full Members, representing the various segments of EcoMobility and the action sectors in a balanced proportion. The Secretary General of the Alliance is a Member of the Steering Group ex officio, while the chairperson is elected amongst the Steering Group Members.

Its role is: a) to decide on the Membership dues schedule; b) to appoint the Secretary General; c) to supervise the Secretary General; d) to endorse a five-year strategy and submit it to the Alliance Assembly for approval; e) to approve an annual workplan based on the Strategy; f) to monitor and review the implementation of the Workplan; g) to establish Working Groups after consultation of all Members; h) to review the annual Financial Report and submit it to the Alliance Assembly for approval; i) to review new membership applications to the Alliance and admit new members; j) to terminate memberships; k) to resolve conflicts arising between Members.

The Steering Group meets at least twice a year and decisions are taken by absolute majority. Each member has a vote, but in case of a tie the chairperson can cast a second vote. Full Members that are not part of the Steering Group can still participate to its meetings as observers, but they are not entitled to vote.

=== Secretariat ===
The Secretariat is the operative body of the EcoMobility Alliance. It is operated through and legally represented by its host, ICLEI - Local Governments for Sustainability. The Secretariat office is in Bonn, Germany. The Secretariat is headed by the Secretary General, supported by an international staff.

The Secretary General is the Alliance's leading representative and executive agent. He is appointed by the Steering Group on a permanent basis. His role is: a) to represent the Alliance and be its primary spokesperson; b) to coordinate the Alliance's advocacy activities; c) to organise activities and events; d) to provide Members with information about the Alliance; e) to manage the Alliance's Secretariat; f) to administer the working groups; g) to coordinate product development consortia amongst the Members; h) to prepare the five-year strategy; i) to prepare the annual Workplan; j) to prepare the annual Activity Report; k) to prepare and manage the annual budget; l) to prepare the annual Financial Report; m) to ensure the implementation of the five-year Strategy and the annual Workplan; n) to organise and manage the Alliance Assembly's meetings.

=== Working Groups ===
The Working Groups are the Alliance's mechanism to undertake substantive work and implement the Strategy. Working Groups are established by the Steering Group for a certain period of time with a definite mandate and cease to exist once their objectives are achieved. The Steering Group defines also the purpose, goals and mandate of each Working Group, after consultation with all Members. All types of Members can take part in the Working Groups, after having notified the Secretary General of their participation.

The role of the Working Groups consists in: a) implementing one or several goals of the five-year Strategy, in line with the objectives of the annual Workplan; b) to implement additional projects mandated by the Steering Group or the Alliance Assembly.

== Examples of EcoMobility vehicles ==
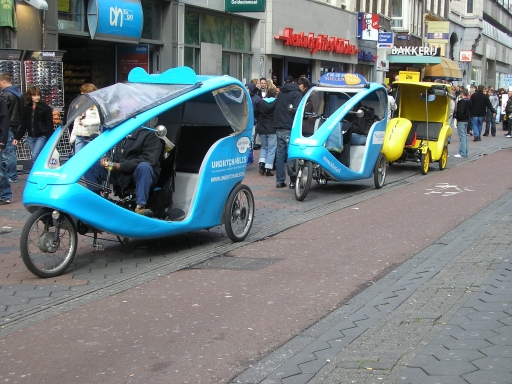
Pedicabs

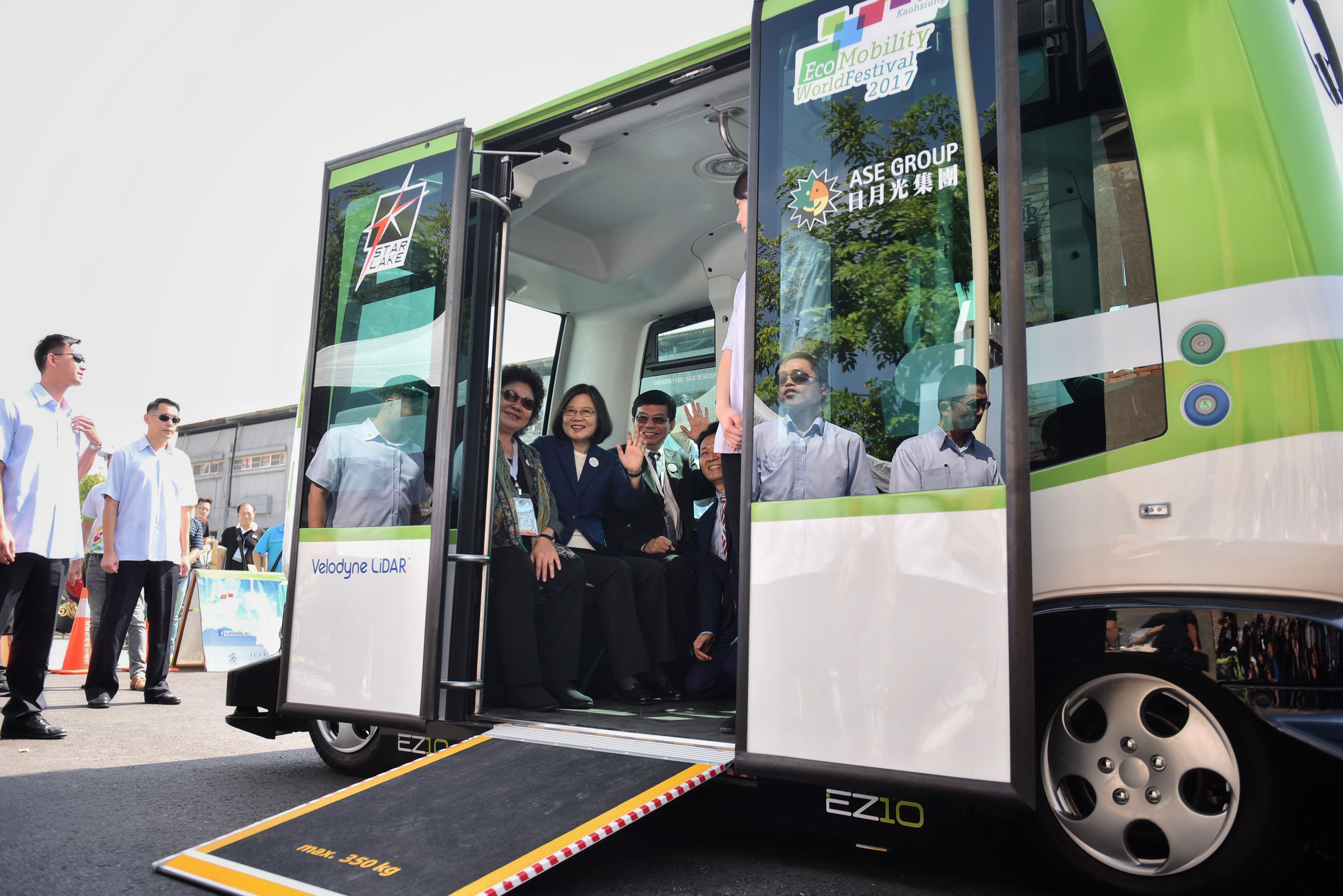

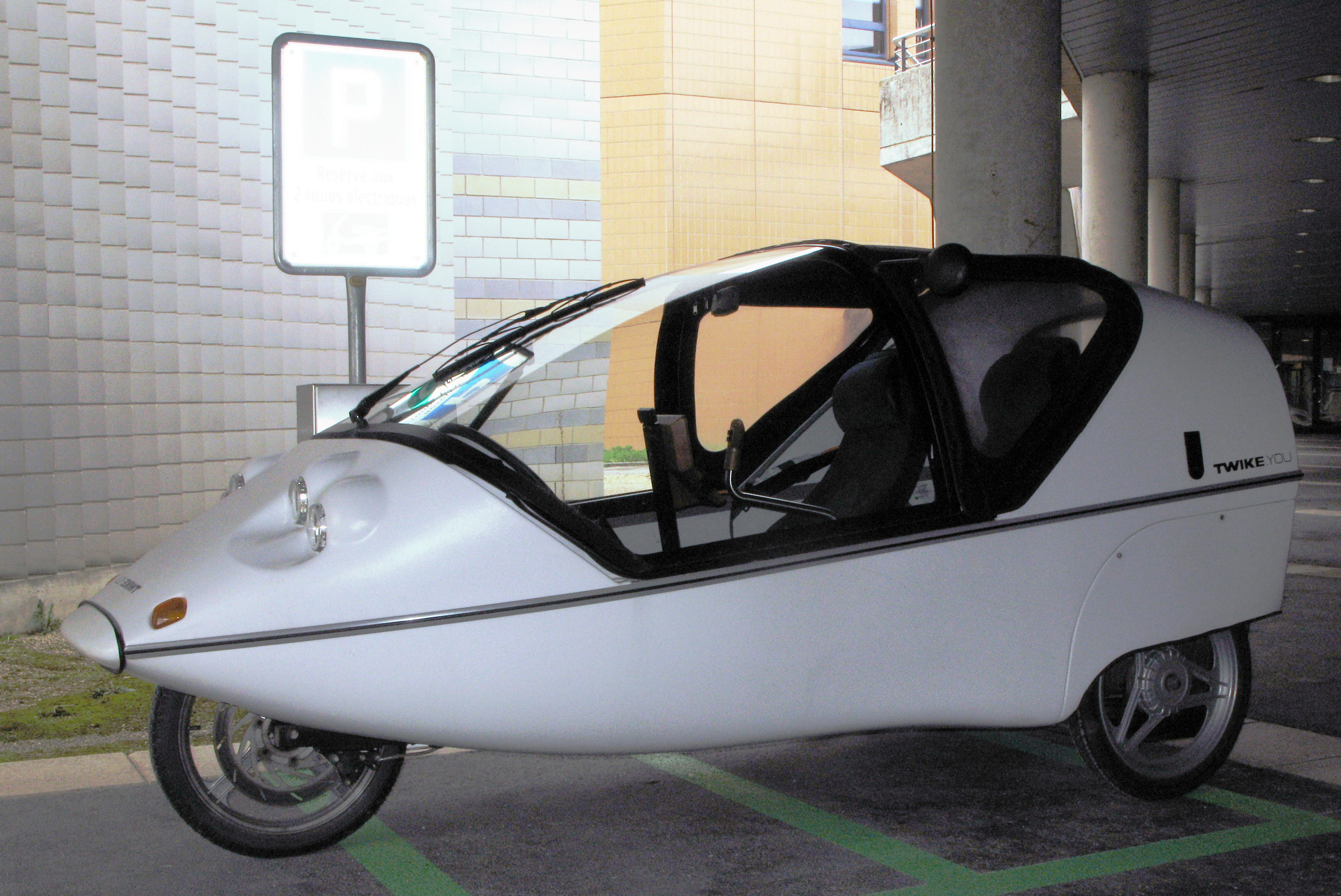
Twike

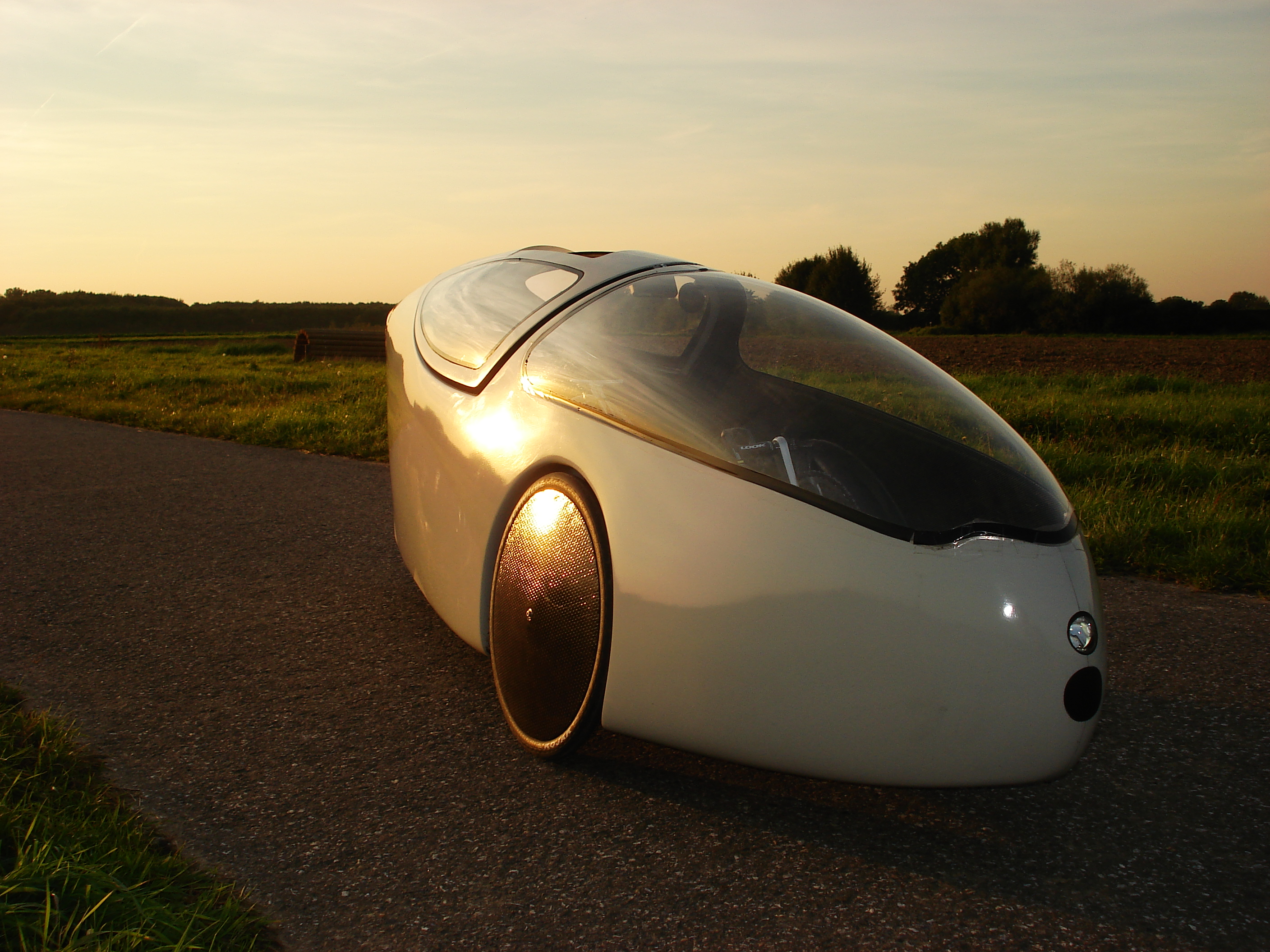
Velomobile

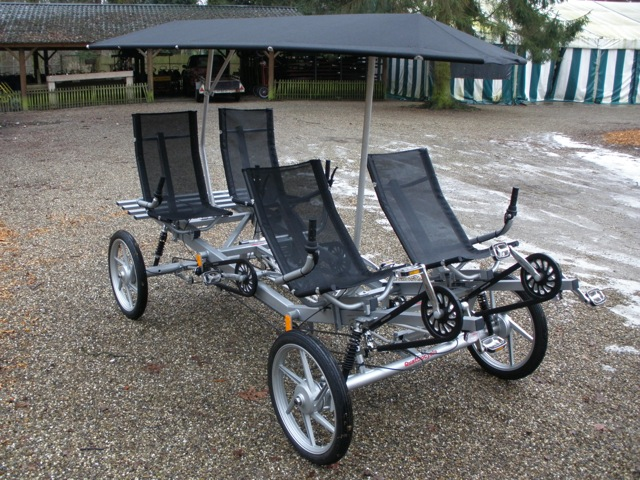
Quadracycle

== See also ==
- Cycling advocacy
- Cycling infrastructure
- Green vehicle
- New Mobility
- New Urbanism
- Sustainable transport
- Walkability
- Walking audit
