= Neun =

Neun may refer to:

- Jörg Neun, a retired German football player
- Johnny Neun, who was an American first baseman for the Detroit Tigers and the Boston Braves
- Manfred Neun, a German entrepreneur
- NeuN, a protein marker of neurons, concentrated in neuronal nuclei
