= Bernhard Ensink =

Dutch theologian, politician and manager

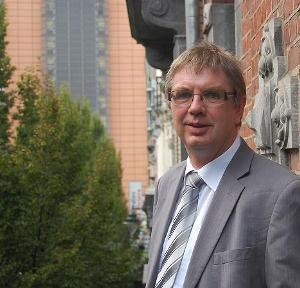
- Born: September 5, 1956 (age 70); Hilten, Neuenhaus, Grafschaft Bentheim, Germany

Bernhard Wilhelm Ensink (born September 5, 1956) is a Dutch theologian, politician and manager. He has been the secretary general of the European Cyclists' Federation (ECF) from 2006 to 2019.

== Life and education ==
Ensink grew up in Laar, Grafschaft Bentheim, Germany, where his German parents ran a farm. After graduating at the Gymnasium Nordhorn, he studied theology in Bethel/Bielefeld, Münster and Kampen. He obtained his master's degree in 1985. The focus of his master thesis was on ‘time' in the works of the German Theologian Wolfhart Pannenberg. Additionally, he took courses for a diploma to teach German language at Dutch schools. From 1992 to 1994 he passed courses for human resource management, business administration and marketing for non-governmental organisations.

Ensink currently lives in Coevorden, Drenthe. He is married and has two children.

== Career ==
From 1980 to 1987, Ensink taught German language and religions at secondary schools in the Netherlands.

In 1987, he returned to the Theologische Universiteit Kampen to give lectures on the history of theology and to do research. His PhD-thesis was on the relationship between ‘Ethics and Theology’, analyzing the works of Joseph Butler. He received his doctorate in 1995. His promoter was Gerrit Manenschijn.

In 1990, he was elected a member of the city council of Coevorden for the local political party PAC (Progressief Accoord Coevorden) for the first time. After he won the local elections with this party in 1994, he became the deputy mayor (Wethouder) in charge of finances, spatial planning, housing, environment, public relations and communications and small and medium enterprises. He was deputy mayor of Coevorden until 1998, when that city merged with four other municipalities to the new municipality Coevorden.

In 1998, he was the director ad interim of the regional environmental non-governmental organisation Milieufederatie Groningen for half a year. In November of that year, Ensink was appointed director of the Dutch Fietsersbond (Cyclists’ Union). He was the CEO of this non-governmental organisation for more than 7 years.

After he had left the city council of Coevorden in 1999, Ensink was elected as a member of the city council again in 2006 and 2010. He was the leader of the PAC fraction and the second deputy of the chair of the council. Additionally, he was a member of the governance committee of the Dutch association of municipalities VNG (Vereniging Nederlandse Gemeenten).

In May 2006, Ensink was appointed by the board of the international non-governmental organization European Cyclists' Federation (ECF) to Secretary General and Velo-city Series Director. Ensink's tasks were to build up an office again in Brussels.
