= Manfred Neun =

German entrepreneur

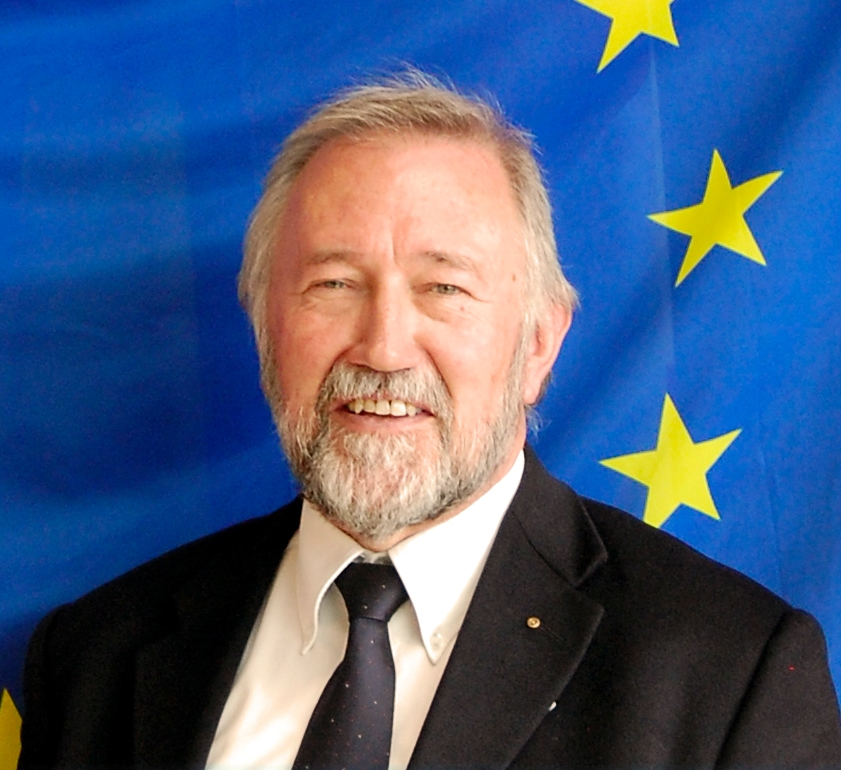
- Neun in front of the European Flag
- Born: 21 August 1950 (age 75); Heidenheim an der Brenz, Baden-Württemberg, West Germany
- Occupation: former President of the European Cyclists' Federation

Manfred Neun (born 21 August 1950) is a German entrepreneur and a key figure in cycling advocacy. He is the former president of the European Cyclists' Federation and actively advocates for cycling and utility cycling in Europe and abroad.

== Life and business ==
Manfred Neun was born in 1950 in Heidenheim an der Brenz, Baden-Württemberg, Southern Germany where his parents ran a nursery. He started his professional life by undertaking a banker's apprenticeship and also managing the horticultural enterprise that his parents owned.

He also managed a medium enterprise designing, assembling and trading bicycles and bicycle parts. In those days he earned the nickname the “Father of the Trekking Bike" with a 1986 example of his bike on display in the Deutsches Museum. Currently he is involved in two family businesses but is on a sabbatical leave due to his presidency. He currently lives with his family in Memmingen, Germany.

He has a brother, Dr Hansjörg Neun, who has been director of the Technical Centre for Agricultural and Rural Cooperation ACP-EU (CTA) since May 2005. In their youth, the two brothers shared a passion for sailing with Manfred also partaking in other outdoor sports including walking, mountaineering, skiing, sailing and cycling.

== Academic career ==
Neun studied economic psychology at the University of Augsburg in the 1970s with a focus on health, behaviour, energy use, transport development and transfer economics. After his degree, he was involved in research studying economic psychological aspects related to public and private transport in an urban environment. He was lecturer at four universities (University of Augsburg, Heidenheim University; University of Ulm and the Ravensburg University of Cooperative Education) and held various lessons on topics such as planning, human resource management and organisational development.

=== Academic approach to cycling ===
In ECF, Neun thought to adopt a more scientific based approach to Velo-city conferences and cycling advocacy in general. This scientific approach was woven into the growing number of themes, case studies and best-practise examples at the Velo-city series. This approach was prepared together with Dr. Martin Held and Dr. Bernhard Ensink and started in 2007.

Neun also took initiative in implementing the Scientists for Cycling network during a Velo-city Global Conference in 2010 in Copenhagen which seeks to unite scientists and professionals for increased interdisciplinary research on utility cycling and advocating pro-cycling policies.

Neun is regularly invited to attend conferences and speak at universities. His latest academic work has been to announce the emergence of a cycling economy at the Velo-city 2011 conference in Seville.

== Cycling advocacy ==
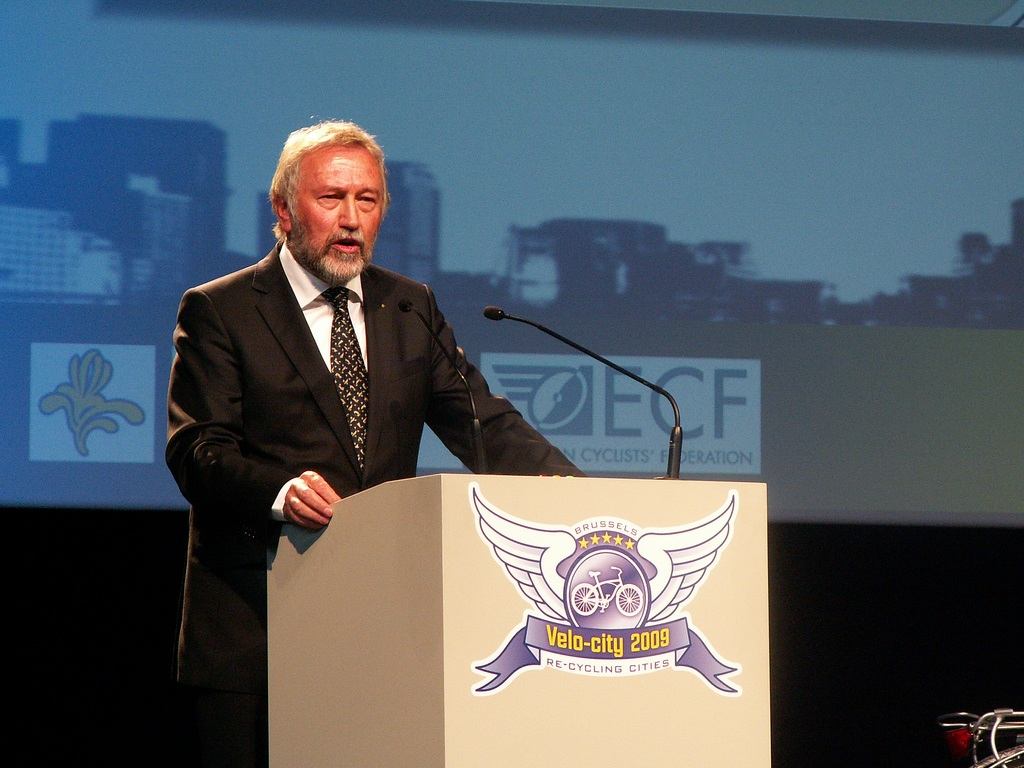
Manfred Neun speaking at the Velo-city Conference in Brussels, 2009

Neun has described his approach to cycling advocacy as combining his experience in the bicycle business, his involvement in small to medium size enterprises, his academic background and his experience in NGOs. Prior to his presidency at the European Cyclists' Federation, Neun was president of the German Two-Wheel Wholesalers' Association (now integrated into the Zweirad Industrie Verband – ZIV, a COLIBI-COLIPED member association), executive vice-president of the Chamber of Industry and Commerce of his home region, and a member of the Plenary Assembly of the Chamber of Industry and Commerce of Swabia.

Neun brings his business background to bridge the gap between cycling advocates, industry, politicians and experts, announcing at the International Transport Forum in Leipzig, Germany in May 2011 that: "We need our industrial culture, and we need our big companies to get behind the Cycling Economy."

His approach to cycling advocacy can be considered global in nature with Neun launching the 2010 Velo-city Global Conference in Copenhagen alongside a range of global cycling advocacy networks including Cities for Cyclists and Scientists for Cycling. Neun also advocated for cycling on a global level at the 2011 International Transport Forum, participating in panel discussions on mobility rights and innovation.

== Presidency of the European Cyclists' Federation ==
Neun's initial election as the president of the European Cyclists' Federation was in 2005 at the annual general meeting in Brijuni, Croatia. Under his presidency, he oversaw the creation of the Declaration of Berne which recognizes pedelecs (pedal electric bicycles) as bicycles and the Charter of Brussels. He was also instrumental in implementing the Velo-city 2010 Global (2010) conference in Copenhagen and the Charter of Seville (2011) at the Velo-city 2011 Seville Conference. Neun was the first president to give the European Cyclists' Federation representation at the International Transport Forum. He finished his presidency in December 2017.

== Quotes ==
- "The benefit of introducing 10 million e-Bikes would be much higher than introducing a million electric cars"
- "Cycling means happiness, cycling is community building and as everyone can have a bicycle, cycling is democracy. We can be an example for the whole world. So let us all live like examples"
