= Around the Bay in a Day =

Cycling event in Victoria, Australia

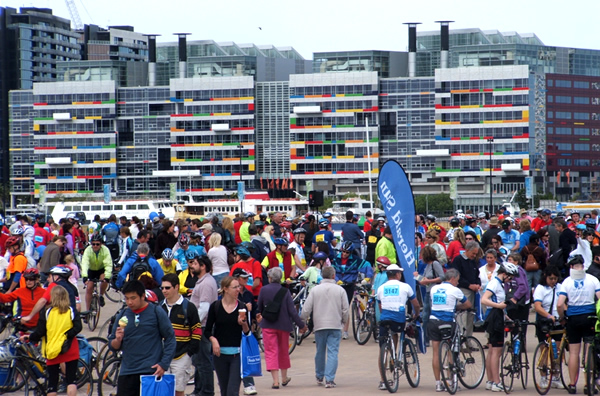
- Finish area of the 2006 event, at Melbourne Docklands.
- Status: Active
- Genre: Non-competitive fully supported recreational cycling fundraising event
- Frequency: Annually; in October
- Locations: Port Phillip Bay, Victoria
- Country: Australia
- Inaugurated: 1993
- Participants: circa 14,000 to 17,000
- Organiser: Bicycle Network

Around the Bay in a Day is a non-competitive fully supported recreational cycling fundraising event organised by Bicycle Network in Victoria, Australia. Cyclists register to ride a course which is 210 km (130 mi) either clockwise or anti-clockwise around Port Phillip Bay, starting and ending in Melbourne, though other distances, both shorter and longer, are available.

== Routes ==
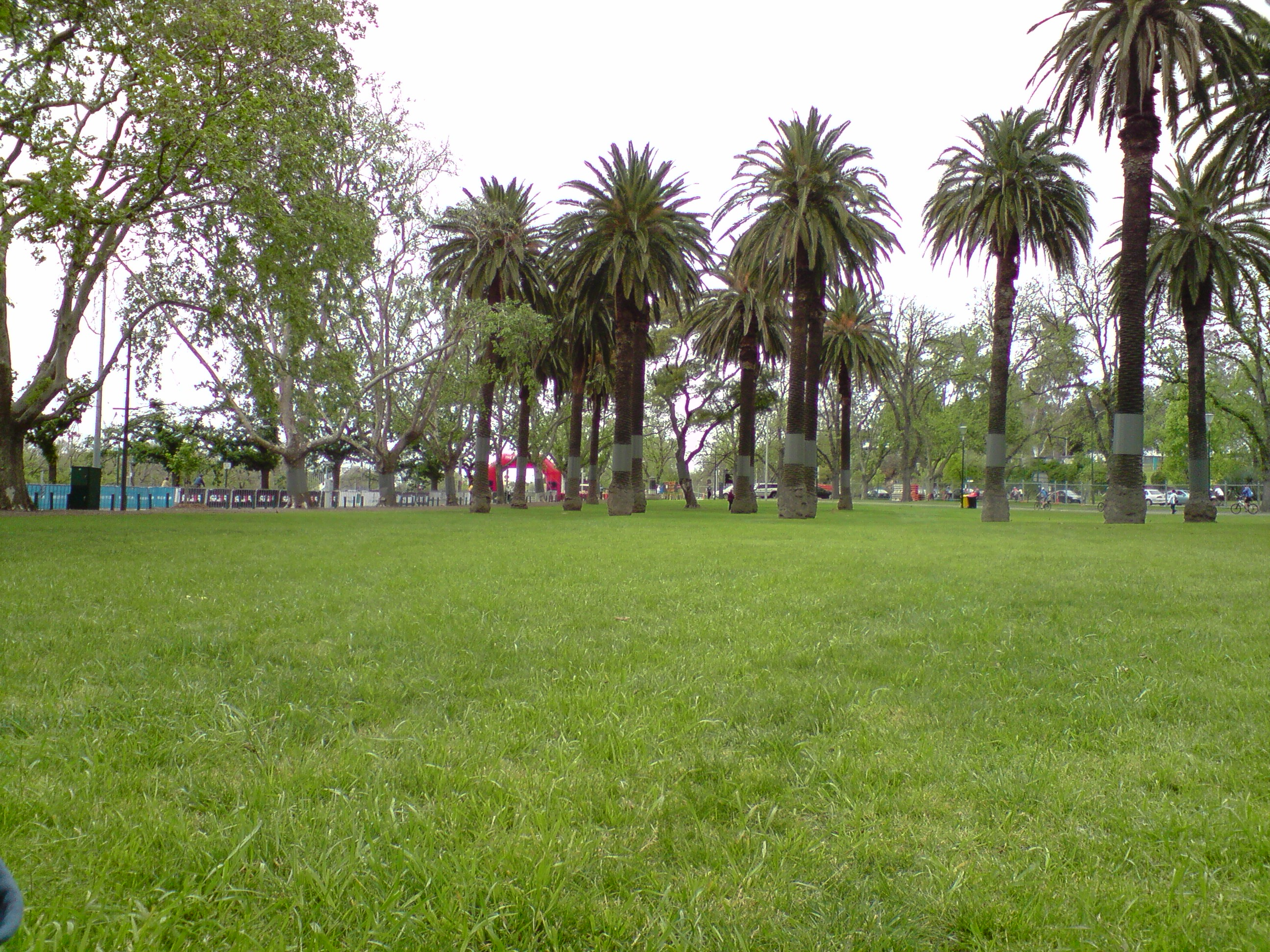
Finish area of the 2009 event, in Alexandra Gardens, Melbourne.

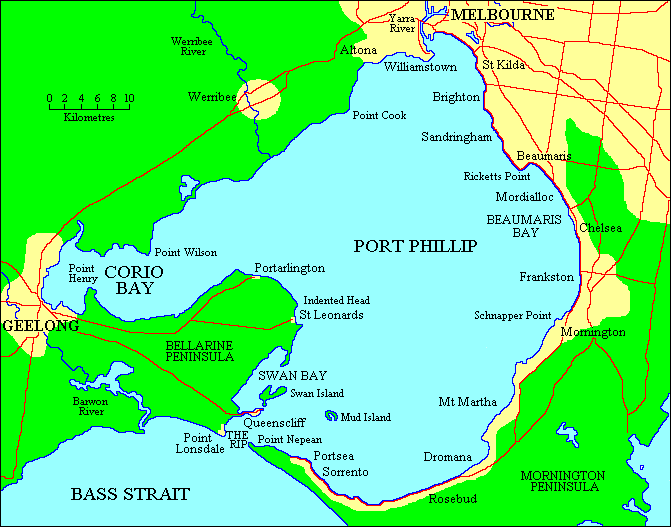
Map of the Port Phillip area.

Cyclists register to ride a course which was originally 210 km (130 mi) (but later augmented with a 250 km (160 mi) option) either clockwise or anti-clockwise around Port Phillip Bay, starting and ending in Melbourne, and catching the Searoad Ferry between Queenscliff and Sorrento. For those who choose to do the 210 km (130 mi) or 250 km (160 mi) route (the only two that properly fit the event description) the ride begins and ends at Alexandra Gardens. Half of the riders head towards the east-side of the bay, riding to Sorrento, and the other half head west towards Queenscliff. Riders cross the bay near the Port Phillip heads on ferries to complete the ride.

In 2005 entrants were offered shorter alternative rides, a 100 km (62 mi) ride from Sorrento to Docklands, or a 50 km (31 mi) ride to the western suburbs and return from the Alexandra Gardens using the West Gate Bridge in both directions.

With the popularity of these alternative shorter routes, and responding to the growing number of cyclists wanting to take part in Australia's biggest one-day challenge ride, the then Bicycle Victoria devised four options for the ride scheduled for 15 October 2006. The organisers expected 9000 participants to choose from the Legend 250 km (160 mi) or the Challenge 210 km (130 mi) ride. Less experienced riders could pick the Classic, which included the West Gate Bridge, or the Bay Ride. A post ride count put the number of total entrants to more than 14,000, raising $440,000.

- The Legend starts at Docklands, heads down to Queenscliff via Geelong and the Bellarine Peninsula, crosses on the ferry to Sorrento, then back to Melbourne.
- The Challenge takes the opposite tack down to Sorrento, cross to Queenscliff on the ferry, then back to Melbourne, without the Bellarine Peninsula section.
- The Classic starts in Sorrento, heads back to Melbourne via the Mornington Peninsula.
- The 42 km (26 mi) Bay Ride starts at Docklands, pedals to Williamstown, over the West Gate Bridge and back to the cycling festival.

== History ==
The event was first run in 1993, following on from the success the then Bicycle Victoria had experienced with its Great Victorian Bike Ride. Approximately 500 cyclists took part in the inaugural event.

In October 2004, over 8,600 riders took part. In 2005 almost 11,000 people registered for the ride and raised about $300,000 for The Smith Family charity for disadvantaged children.

In 2008 more than 16,000 riders participated in Around the Bay in a Day. Several riders were injured before the start of the ride when a car hit a leading rider in a group on the Nepean Highway at around 4am just south of Mt Eliza. Later on the same day, a male rider collided with a fellow rider and fell head first on to the road at Olivers Hill near Frankston. He was taken to the Alfred Hospital but later died from his injuries.

In 2012, over 17,000 riders took part across the various distances.

On 9 October 2016, the strongest winds hit riders of the event when a cold front brought in wind gusts of up to 100 km/h.

On 6 October 2024, it was raining at the 5:30am start, but shortly after stopped raining and was then clear all day. Today also marked the last year of the 300km option.

On 27 October 2025, the BOM had the previous day forecast over an inch of rain, and for it to rain all morning and afternoon. Rider's woke in the morning to no rain and started the ride in high spirits. It was dry all morning and eventually rained about 11:30am for about two hours. And then there was a heavier but shorter downpour at about 4:30pm, although many of riders had finished by then.

== See also ==
- Cycling in Melbourne
