= Great Victorian Bike Ride =

Cycle tour in Australia

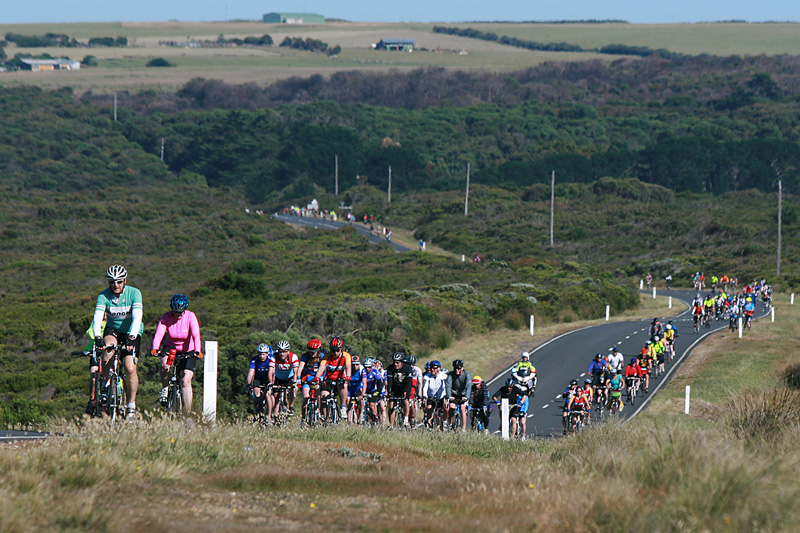
- Riders stretch along the Great Ocean Road near Port Campbell on the 2009 Great Vic.
- Genre: Non-competitive fully supported bicycle touring event
- Frequency: Annually in November/December
- Location: Victoria
- Country: Australian
- Inaugurated: 1984
- Previous event: 2023
- Next event: 2024
- Attendance: circa 3,000-5,000 per annum
- Organiser: Bicycle Network

The Great Victorian Bike Ride, commonly known as The Great Vic, is a non-competitive fully supported eight- or nine-day annual bicycle touring event organised by Bicycle Network. The ride takes different routes around the countryside of the state of Victoria, Australia each year. The total ride distance is usually in the range of 550 kilometres (340 mi), averaging about 70 kilometres (43 mi) a day excluding the rest day. The ride first ran in 1984, attracting 2,100 riders in what was initially supposed to be a one-off event, but due to its unexpected popularity and success it subsequently became an annual event. The Great Vic typically draws several thousand participants each year, with a record of 8,100 riders in 2004, which makes it one of the world's largest supported bicycle rides.

== Event structure ==
The Great Victorian Bike Ride is organised as a single annual event usually of eight to nine days duration, taking place during late November and early December, at the start of the Australian summer. Total ride distance is usually between 500 and 600 kilometres (310 and 370 mi). The average daily ride, not including the rest day, is about 70 kilometres (43 mi), although this can range from less than 40 kilometres (25 mi) to more than 110 kilometres (68 mi).

=== Participants ===
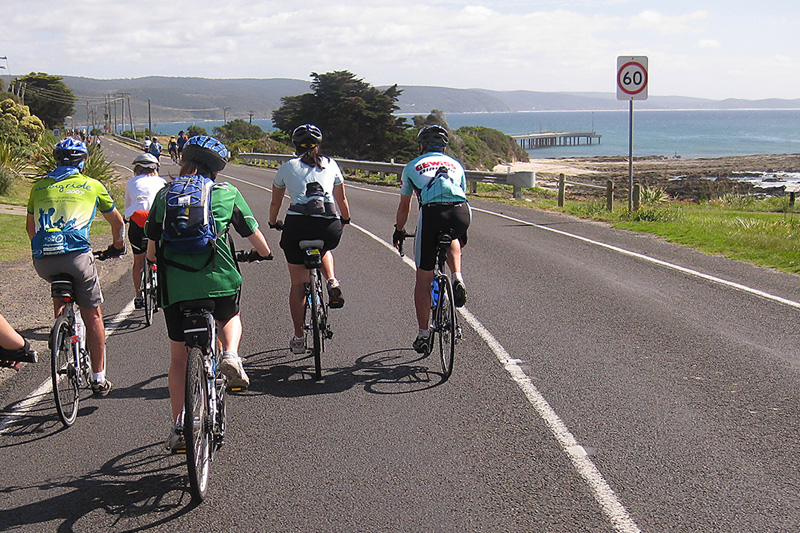
Riders of all ages and abilities do the ride; here a mixed group enters Lorne on the 2009 Great Victorian Bike Ride

The ride is supported and non-competitive, catering to riders of all ages and abilities, from young children to octogenarians, keen racers, fitness enthusiasts, riders with disabilities, and everyone in between. It is not, however, to be considered a "once-a-year" activity for the participants unless they are quite fit and or have had much endurance training. The route can often include long steep mountain roads, and is not recommended for cyclists with less than a moderate level of fitness. The oldest riders to participate were two 87-year-old men who did the ride in 2010. While most riders are from Victoria, cyclists from around Australia and the world also come to take part.

The ride is also completed on all manner of bicycles. Most riders use regular road bikes, mountain bikes, hybrid bikes, and touring bikes of varying standard, quality, and age. Some less typical bikes are also used, including recumbent bikes and tricycles, tandem bikes, folding bicycles, children in bicycle trailers and on trailer bikes, and even occasional unicycles, scooter style footbikes, and custom made bicycles.

Approximately one-third of the riders each year participate as part of school groups from about fifty different schools. Students are predominantly from the middle years of secondary school, and are accompanied on the ride by supervising teachers and parents. A number of riders who have later turned professional have taken part in the Great Vic as students, including former top female rider Anna Millward, and 2011 Tour de France winner Cadel Evans.

=== Ride options ===
The ride is structured as a nine-day event, typically starting on the last Saturday in November and finishing on the first Sunday in December, and including one rest day somewhere around the middle of the ride. Due to its length the Bicycle Network has for many years marketed the ride as "a week in another world".

Bicycle Network now also offers a number of shorter ride options which may vary from year to year in order to cater for more riders. For example, single day rides referred to as the Great Vic Community Ride may be offered, usually either the first or last day of the main ride, or a particularly scenic day. Organisers now also offer a three-day ride option, termed the Great Vic Getaway; this usually covers the last three days of the main ride. Official rider numbers from later years of the rides include these riders who have only taken part in the shorter ride options; this may total from several hundred up to a thousand extra riders.

The cost for the full nine day ride in 2013 was $995 for adults, $760 for children 13 to 17, $435 for children 6 to 12, and free for children five and below. There was a $100 discount for riders who entered before the end of July, lower prices for the shorter ride options, and a late fee for entries paid after the end of October. The cost included meals, luggage transport, provision of campsites, water, toilet and shower facilities, as well as medical and safety support services.

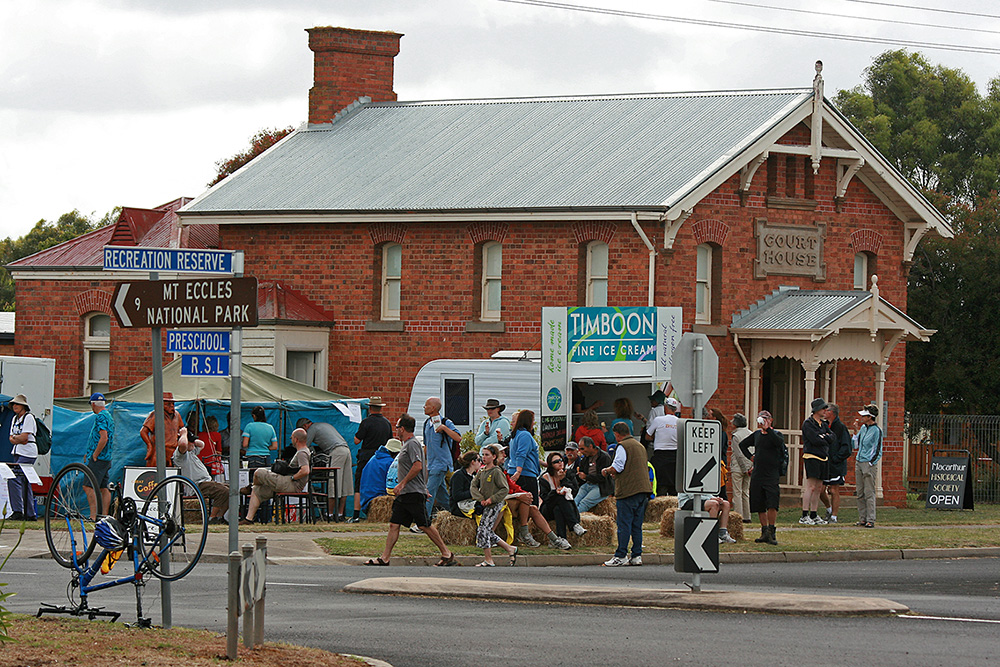
Small towns like Macarthur benefit economically as the Great Victorian Bike Ride brings thousands of visitors

=== Economic benefits ===
The Great Vic is recognised to be economically beneficial to towns along the route, particularly food outlets in towns used for overnight stops and community groups who run successful fundraisers. Some towns and businesses go to great lengths to cater to the thousands of riders passing through. The Herald Sun has stated that "for a small country town, hosting an overnight stay of the Great Victorian Bike Ride is akin to winning the Olympic Games", with some traders reaping "an extra week's, month's, even a year's income from a ride visit".

In 2010 it was estimated that each town hosting a night's stop took in more than A$150,000 from the visitors, with additional income coming from the ride organisers. There were also longer-term benefits because riders regularly returned later to revisit the towns and areas, often bringing others with them. The total economic benefit to communities visited during the 2011 ride was estimated at $2 million.

== Organisation ==
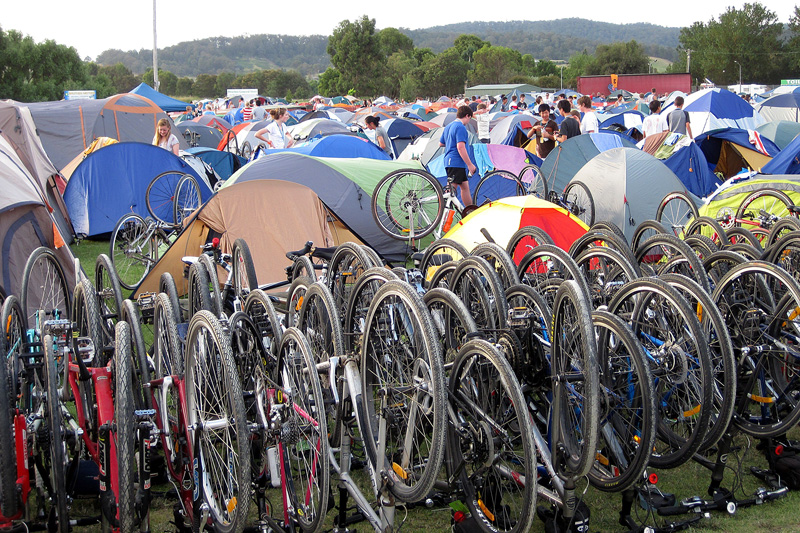
Bikes and tents fill the Bruthen football ground on the first night in 2012

Ride planning begins about a year-and-a-half before the actual event, with Bicycle Network organisers designing a route and arranging options with towns and communities along the route length. The following year's route however remains a secret until it is announced the night before the rest day on each Great Vic. Advance ticket sales are then usually made available to participants on the current ride, following which tickets officially go on sale the next May, in the year of the ride. Finer details continue to be finalised throughout the following year leading up to the ride itself.

Bicycle Network staff and volunteers have developed the facilities and the logistics plans for catering for the needs of several thousand cyclists and volunteers on the move each day of the ride. This includes provision of three meals a day, toilets, showers, washing up facilities, and the transport of many tons of luggage and other equipment. Between the luggage trucks and trucks carrying the ride organisation equipment, portable toilets, showers, and other requirements, typically between fourteen and forty semi-trailer trucks accompany the ride each day. A number of buses are also used to transport volunteers and other workers around the route, with about 180 other vehicles in total supporting the ride.

Volunteers provide much of the labour for the ride, which helps keep costs down for Bicycle Network and therefore lowers entry fees for riders. Bicycle Network also seeks commercial sponsorship, including a naming rights sponsor for the ride which has been the RACV since 2010. Bicycle Network additionally produce and market souvenir merchandise particular to each year's ride, including short and long-sleeved cycling jerseys, polo shirts, caps, and bicycle water bottles designed for use with bottle cages.

Due to the ride structure, and its level of organisation and support, The Age newspaper has called The Great Vic "Arguably the world's greatest one-week cycling holiday".

=== Accommodation ===
Accommodation is camping style, with riders required to provide, set up, and pull down their own tent and sleeping gear each day. The designated campsites are usually on a sporting ground in the town being used for the overnight stop, generally the local football and cricket oval. For an additional cost there is also a 'sleep easy' option where tents are provided, set up and packed down for the riders, or a 'luxury support' option with accommodation provided in motels or bed and breakfast establishments.

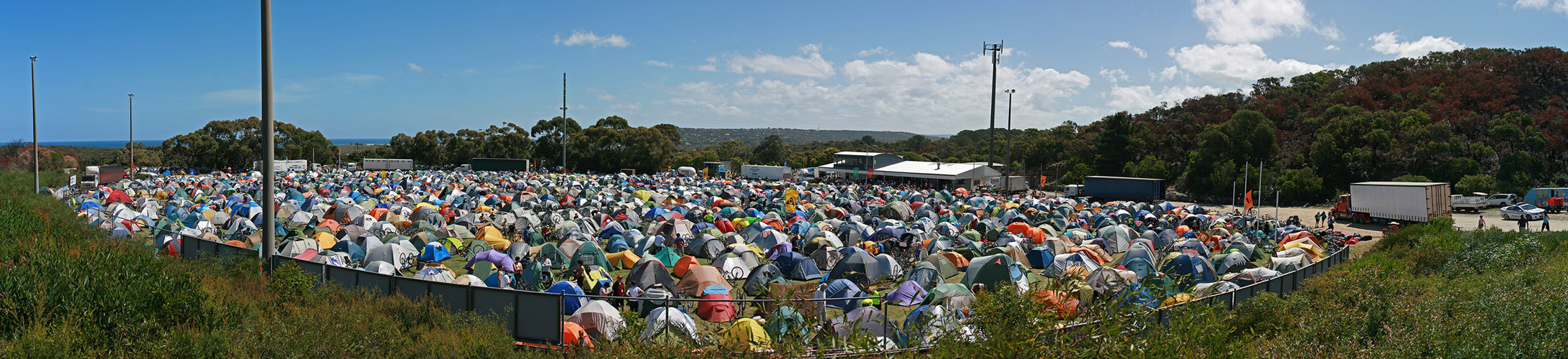
A temporary tent city is set up each night to accommodate the thousands of participants; this is one of two ovals filled with the tents of the 5,000 riders at Anglesea on day 7 in 2009

Along with the food, water, and toilet facilities provided at the overnight campsites, portable shower facilities are also provided, as are dishwashing facilities which also double as clothes washing facilities before meal times. Bicycle Network also provides medical support, and for additional costs extra services such as massages and bicycle repairs, which are usually provided by an outside business.

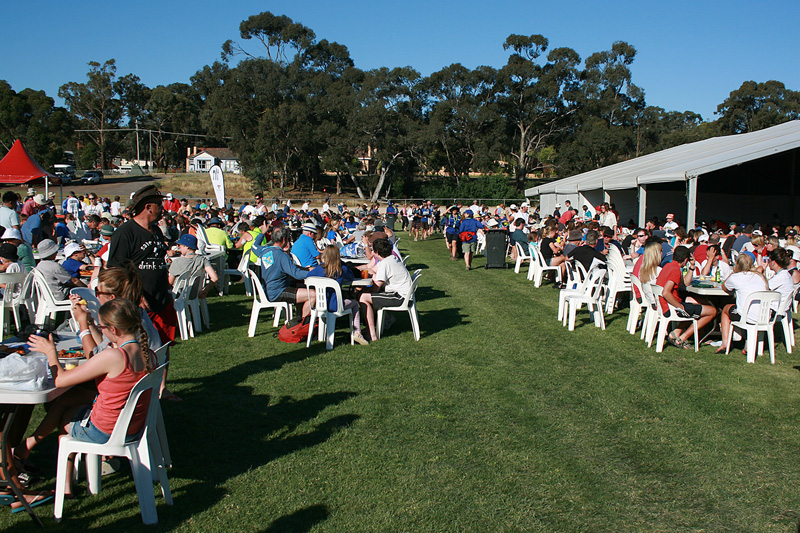
Riders sit down to tea at the Café de Canvas in Wedderburn on day 7 of the 2011 Great Victorian Bike Ride

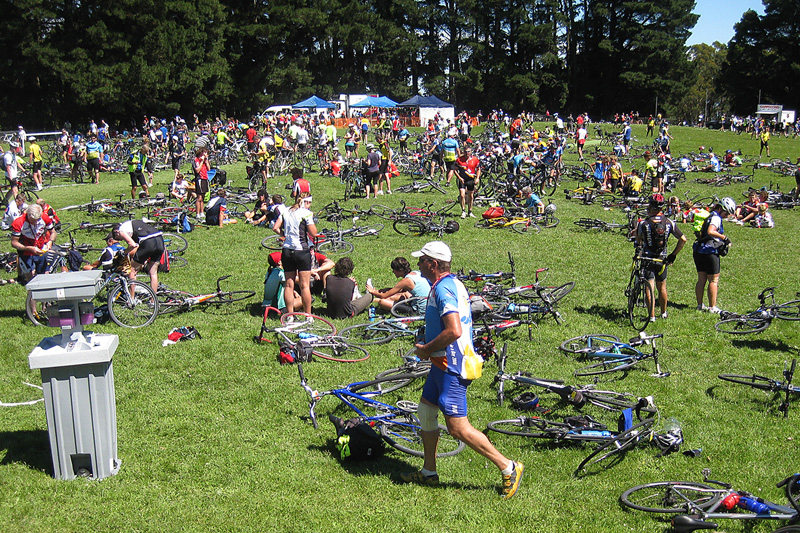
The lunch stop at Lavers Hill on day 5 in 2009

=== Catering ===
The ride itself is fully catered. Breakfast, lunch, and dinner are provided from lunchtime on the first Saturday until breakfast on the final Sunday as part of the cost of the ride. Breakfast and dinner are served from the 'Café de Canvas', with several hundred seats and tables provided both in the open and under a large under-canvas eating and entertainment area. Riders however must supply their own cutlery, plates, and drinking vessels. Lunches are served at one of the rest stops en route. Riders can also take extra supplies at mealtimes, such as fruit, to carry with them as snacks on the ride. The ride organisers additionally run a licensed café as part of the Café de Canvas, and a separate licensed bar, the 'Spokes Bar', sells alcoholic and non-alcoholic drinks. Portable water and toilet facilities are also provided at each designated rest area.

There are also a number of independent food vendors who travel with the ride, selling hot and cold beverages, ice-creams and snack foods at the overnight camping spots and at lunch and rest stops. Many community organisations such as Lions Clubs, sporting groups, and schools along the route use the ride as an opportunity for fundraising, selling snacks and drinks, running sausage sizzles, and selling hot breakfasts to riders.

=== Media and entertainment ===
A daily news-sheet, The Good Oil, is produced, and an FM radio station BYK-FM formerly broadcast. There are now regular website, blog, and Twitter updates, including dedicated hashtags and photographs. An independent media company also follows the ride, producing official event photography and a documentary video of the ride, both available for purchase. External media agencies, such as the ABC and newspapers also regularly follow the ride or send journalists to participate. Nightly entertainment is provided, including live music performances in the Café de Canvas, movie screenings, a talent show, trivia nights, a meet and greet, and roving performers. Many of the towns along the route also provide entertainment, including live music, street markets, and fireworks displays.

=== Luggage ===
Riders are permitted to pack up to 20 kilograms (44 lb) of luggage to be carried on the luggage trucks, including their tents and camping equipment, and can also carry whatever equipment they wish on their bikes. Ride organisers provide approximately one semi-trailer truck to carry the luggage for each 500 riders, so the ride is typically accompanied by at least six to eight luggage trucks.

=== Safety and support ===
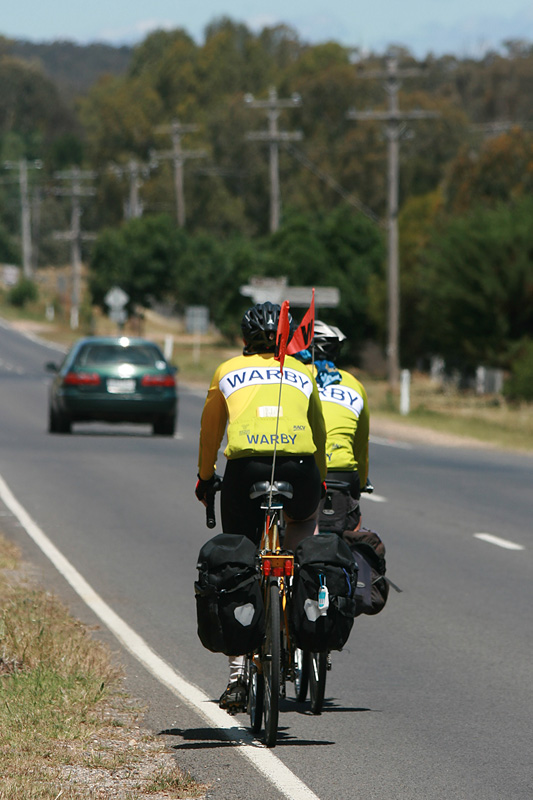
Two WARBYs riding near the back of the field leave Dunolly in 2011

The event generally has a strong safety record, with just three on-road deaths recorded in its thirty-year history. The first was in the 1980s when a man died after crashing his bike (prior to mandatory helmet laws). The second in 2005 when a woman was blown into the path of an oncoming vehicle, being killed instantly. The third was in 2014 when a man died after clipping the wheel of another bike and falling into the path of an overtaking truck. Occasionally other entrants have died of heart attacks, usually in their sleep.

Bicycles are expected to be in a roadworthy condition, including having a functioning warning device such as a bell or horn, and front and rear reflectors. All participants are required to wear a bicycle helmet, as mandated by law in Victoria and Australia. These requirements may be enforced by police.

Hazard and direction signs, rest stops, and route marshals are organised for the ride each day. These include riding marshals who head out each day before participants to direct riders safely through pre-determined locations such as intersections and rest stops, and marshals on motorbikes who form the backbone of communications out on the course by monitoring rider progress and resolving issues as they occur (including first response medical support). A group of volunteer riders called WARBYs (We Are Right Behind You) ride throughout the field, providing emergency assistance for bicycle breakdowns and rider difficulties. A number of sag wagons accompany the ride to pick up riders and bikes who are unable to continue due to their bicycle being beyond roadside repair, injury, sickness, or general weariness.

Designated rest areas, including the lunch stop, are provided roughly every 20 to 35 kilometres (12 to 22 mi) of the ride, dependent on site availability. These are usually set up in a park or sporting ground of a town along the route, but sometimes other smaller off-road sites or even roadside verges have to suffice. At the rest areas Bicycle Network set up water and toilet provisions, and independent vendors are usually also present selling snacks and drinks. Emergency bicycle repair services are normally available as well.

Ride organisers also work closely with Victoria Police and contracted traffic controllers in regards to traffic management and hazard reduction operations. Ambulance Victoria are on call to assist with accidents and medical emergencies during the event. Contracted event medical services are also used extensively during the event providing a first aid contact points in camp at each town and on course at lunch stops, as well as first aid response to riders with vehicle support. A team of riders from the Victoria Police bicycle unit often participate in the ride each year. Emergency management plans are in place in case of bushfires or other natural disasters.

=== Timing ===
The timing of the ride is to try to take advantage of generally favourable weather at the start of summer in Victoria, with warm days, mild nights, relatively little rainfall and less wind than at other times of year. Despite expected mild conditions, severe weather can nonetheless be common, ranging from temperatures in excess of 40 °C (104 °F), heavy rainfall and thunderstorms, and cold windy conditions. For example, the 2012 ride saw seventeen riders hospitalised with fears of hypothermia due to the wet and cold on day four, while just a matter of days both before and after this many riders struggled with the heat when temperatures reached the high-30s.

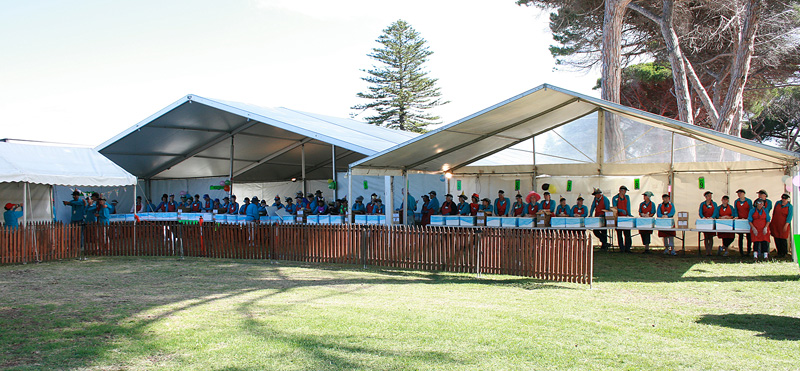
Volunteers in catering prepare to serve tea on the final night of the 2009 Great Vic in Queenscliff

=== Volunteers ===
Many of the facilities and services provided on the ride are contributed by around 400 volunteers each year. Volunteers include those with family and friends doing the ride but who do not want to ride themselves, former riders no longer able to participate, and many who simply enjoy the atmosphere of the ride. Some of the volunteers also participate in the ride itself. Volunteer positions include catering services, medical services, luggage handlers, route marshals, information and media services, sign production, sag wagon, Warby team, cleaning services, tent set-up, and campsite services. A total of thirty-five different volunteer teams operate on the ride. Often volunteers will be under the guidance of paid employees, or assisting paid independent contractors in providing a service. Without the level of support provided by volunteer labour the cost of ride would become prohibitively expensive for many riders.

== Ride history ==
=== Origin ===
In America in the 1970s there had been a number of rides starting with the Great Six Day Bicycle Ride across the state of Iowa first held in 1973, which just 114 riders completed in its first year, but in its second year it jumped to 2,700 riders. The ride was promoted by The Des Moines Register newspaper and soon became an annual event, eventually becoming the Register's Annual Great Bike Ride Across Iowa (RAGBRAI) and had up to 16,000 riders. The average length of these rides was 460 miles (740 km) and riders averaged 120 km a day. In 1976, there was also the Bikecentennial, an event consisting of a series of bicycle tours on the TransAmerica Bicycle Trail across the United States in the summer of 1976 in commemoration of the United States Bicentennial.

Anna Lanigan of the small bicycle touring club Crankset suggested to Ron Shepherd that a ride like the American Bikecentennial should be organised for Victoria to celebrate the sesquicentennial of the British settlement of the state. Shepherd thought it a wonderful idea and took it to the Bicycle Institute of Victoria. (The BIV later became Bicycle Victoria and is now called Bicycle Network.) The BIV agreed that it was a good idea and decided to call it the Great Victorian Bike Ride taking cues from RAGBRAI, the original Iowan ride. The BIV received a government grant of $10,000 for the ride and gave it to Graham Rebbeck to organise. For the planning on how to run the ride, Rebbeck sought advice from organisers of large events including the Australian Army. Realising that the grant was not going to be enough, Rebbeck sought out and finally came up with a sponsor, oil company Caltex, who promised an additional $25,000.

The Great Victorian Bike Ride was first organised in 1984 as a one-off event, the first ever event organised by the Bicycle Institute of Victoria. It was a nine-day route which ran from Wodonga to the state capital Melbourne without a rest day, and which attracted 2,100 riders. Although conditions were quite primitive, the ride nonetheless proved popular and attracted strong demand for a follow-up event the next year.

=== Early success ===
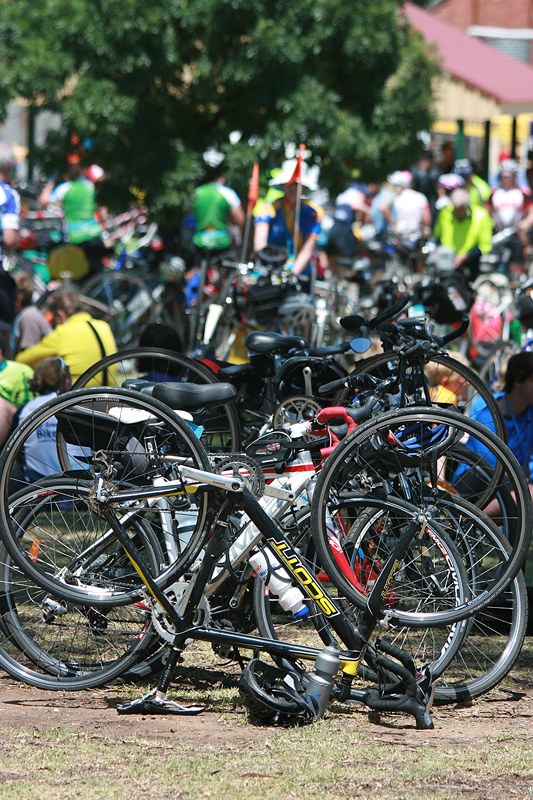
Massed bikes and riders are symbolic of the Great Vic

The second event in 1985 followed a nearly identical route as the first one, leading to a small decrease in the number of riders taking part to 1,900, the fewest in the event's history. However, as organisation improved and different routes began to be offered the ride soon became a well regarded annual event. A rest day was introduced for the third ride, and popularity quickly grew, with rider numbers rising by more than 500 a year. By the Great Victorian Bike Ride's fourth year in 1987, when it first covered a section of the spectacular Great Ocean Road, numbers had almost doubled from the early days to over 3,600. In the 6th event in 1989, following a not dissimilar route to the first two Great Vics, rider numbers had swelled to close to 5,000. The 8th ride in 1991 attracted a then record of nearly 6,000 riders for a route that included the full length of the Great Ocean Road for the first time, a number that still stands as the second highest participation rate in the event's history.

=== Decline ===
After the boom of the 1991 ride the popularity of the Great Vic started to significantly and quickly decline. Just five years later in 1996 a return visit to again ride the full Great Ocean Road was only able to draw just over 3,000 riders. The next three years from 1997 to 1999 would see the three lowest participation rates since the origin of the ride, with the 15th event in 1998 drawing less than 2,000 riders for the only time other than the second Great Vic in 1985. Even another return to ride the full length of the Great Ocean Road for the millennial event in the year 2000 could attract just 2,600 pedallers.

=== Rebirth ===
With the future of the event in jeopardy, Bicycle Network began to make improvements to the structure of the ride, and this along with increased publicity saw numbers again starting to increase. The traditional Melbourne finish that had characterised the ride for almost twenty years was gradually abandoned, allowing for more variety in routes which could now both start and finish anywhere in the state.

From the 20th event in 2003 Bicycle Network began giving the rides catchy names for improved marketing, christening that year's event the "Summit to Sea". That year, for the first and only time in the ride's history the Great Vic journeyed into Victoria's alpine areas, with a mountaintop start on the state's highest sealed road at the 1,861 metres (6,106 ft) high Mount Hotham. The route then descended along the scenic Great Alpine Road for 175 kilometres (109 mi) to its end in Bairnsdale, before travelling through Gippsland and finishing in Mornington, the first time it had ever finished outside suburban Melbourne. These new features of the ride saw rider numbers immediately increase by 1,000 over the previously stagnating participation rates.

The 21st anniversary event in 2004 saw the Great Vic finally regain and surpass its former popularity. A free new bike was given to each ride registrant, and this well publicised offering, coupled with a return to the Great Ocean Road, led to a new record of 8,100 riders taking part.

=== Notable occurrences ===
Some other notable firsts, achievements, and occurrences since 2004 have included:

- In 2005 the Great Vic recorded its first death of a rider due to a collision with a motor vehicle and only its second ever on-road fatality. Regular participant, 53-year-old mother of five Deborah Gray, was killed instantly when a strong gust of wind blew her into the path of an oncoming four-wheel drive at 10.15am on 28 November, during day three of the ride on the Murray Valley Highway east of Gunbower.
- The 2007 ride finished 356 kilometres (221 mi) from Melbourne in the small Gippsland town of Buchan. This was the furthest ever finish from Melbourne, and the only time the ride's finish has been significantly further away from Melbourne than its start.
- In 2008 for the first and only time the entire cycling route was a loop, starting and finishing in Ballarat.
- In 2009 another visit to the Great Ocean Road was capped at 5,000 riders due to the logistical problems that had been experienced dealing with the record number of riders in 2004. Entries were filled within a few weeks of going on sale to the general public, the only time a Great Vic has officially sold out.
- For 2010, as an indication of the community-minded consciousness of the ride, the event travelled through areas that had been devastated by drought and 2009's Black Saturday bushfires. This was an effort to bring tourism and business back to the impacted communities, with a finish in the town of Marysville which had been almost completely destroyed in the conflagration.
- On day six of the 28th running in 2011 officially the longest single day's ride in the history of the Great Victorian Bike Ride took place, with a leg from Echuca to Boort of 111 kilometres (69 mi).
- Day four in 2012 was arguably the ride's toughest day ever. An already challenging route from Rosedale to Traralgon through the Strzelecki Ranges, including a 26 kilometres (16 mi) climb with 10 kilometres (6.2 mi) of gravel, was hit by a day of unseasonably wet and cold weather. Seventeen riders were hospitalised with fears of hypothermia, and many hundreds more finished on sag wagons, suffering from cold, accidents, or unrideable bikes. Other riders took an easy shortcut along the highway between the towns, meaning only a small fraction of the field completed the full ride.
- The 30th anniversary Great Vic in 2013 again ventured back to the Great Ocean Road, with a first time ever visit to South Australia, starting in Mount Gambier. Participants were capped at 5,000 for the full route as in 2009, with an extra 1,000 tickets available for riders taking up a shorter ride option, although ultimately this ride did not sell out.
- From 2014, although still billing the ride as nine days, the first Saturday was rebranded as "arrival day" with no riding, therefore effectively reducing the ride from eight days on the bike plus the rest day to seven days riding (prior to this riders could arrive and camp on the Friday night, with a usually short day's ride on the Saturday). The total ride distance was concomitantly reduced to just 500 kilometres (310 mi), the shortest recorded ride length. The 2015 ride was similarly reduced to seven days riding, as well as the rest day and arrival day, making it clear that although Bicycle Network still publicise the GVBR as a nine-day ride, it has been reduced by one day since 2014.
- In 2014 a third on-road death was recorded, and only the second due to an incident with a motor vehicle. A 65-year-old man from Echuca, Trevor Pearce, died when his bike clipped the wheel of another rider and he fell into the path of an overtaking truck. The accident took place at about 11.00am on Wednesday 3 December during day five of the ride on the Mansfield-Whitfield Road at the locality of Barwite, about 6 kilometres (3.7 mi) from the finishing point for the day in Mansfield.
- In 2017 the last two days of the ride were cancelled due to a forecast of a "super-storm" over those days, which was expected to cause a state-wide deluge. This was the first time on record that the ride had been shortened in this way. Some riders who had taken a three-day ride option therefore only had one day on the ride. The forecast weather event was ultimately less severe than expected, meaning the ride could have safely proceeded.
- In August 2020 it was announced that the entire ride for that year had been officially cancelled for the first time in its history due to the COVID-19 pandemic, which was particularly severe in Victoria during the second half of the year. Despite plans to hold the ride in 2021, which was to follow the same route as the cancelled 2020 ride, that ride was also called off due to the ongoing COVID-19 pandemic situation in Victoria.
- In 2022, an end to COVID-19 pandemic lockdowns and easing restrictions overall in relation to the pandemic saw a cut-down version of the ride offered in the autumn of that year as a replacement for the cancelled rides of the previous two years. Tagged "The Little Vic", it was a shortened three-day ride from Thursday, 31 March to Sunday, 3 April, and followed a section of route of the cancelled 2020 and 2021 rides. A new full version of the ride was also offered at the regular time towards the end of 2022, although this too saw some minor route changes prior to the ride due to excessively wet conditions. 2022 was also the first and only time two official Great Vics have been held in the same calendar year.

=== Legacy ===
The success of the Great Vic ultimately led to Bicycle Network organising other cycling events. This has included interstate and international equivalents of the Great Victorian Bike Ride which have run annually since 1990. These rides, now known as the Great Escapade, have visited most states of Australia, including Tasmania, Western Australia, New South Wales, South Australia, and Queensland, as well as other countries including New Zealand, New Caledonia, and Thailand. Bicycle Network also organises other popular rides, including the very successful Around the Bay in a Day event, which started in 1993 and now regularly involves over 10,000 riders.

Other cycling organisations around Australia, such as Bicycle Queensland and Bicycle NSW, have also followed the lead of Bicycle Network to establish their own equivalents of the Great Vic at various times. The most successful of these is Cycle Queensland run by Bicycle Queensland, which has run as an annual event since 2002. Cycle Queensland runs for about 500 kilometres (310 mi) over eight days in early September, typically attracting about 1,000 participants, with a record of 1,160 riders in 2008.

== Route history ==
The table below indicates the history of ride, including routes, approximate distances and numbers of riders. Some of the figures provided are estimates.

Ride	Year	Name^{1}	Start	Towns used for overnight stops	Finish	Dist (km)^{2}	Riders^{3}	Map^{4}
1	1984		Wodonga	Beechworth, Benalla, Shepparton, Rushworth, Bendigo, Maryborough, Ballarat, Sunbury	Melbourne		2,100	
2	1985		Wodonga	Beechworth, Benalla, Shepparton, Rushworth, Bendigo, Maryborough, Daylesford, Sunbury	Melbourne		1,900	
3	1986		Bairnsdale	Yarram, Foster (RD), Leongatha, Korumburra, Warragul, Pakenham, Rosebud	Melbourne		2,600	
4	1987		Stawell	Halls Gap, Hamilton, Port Fairy, Port Campbell, Colac, Torquay, Rosebud	Melbourne		3,650	
5	1988		Swan Hill	Lake Boga, Cohuna, Echuca (RD), Colbinabbin, Castlemaine, Kyneton, Bacchus Marsh	Melbourne		4,200	
6	1989		Yarrawonga	Rutherglen, Yackandandah, Myrtleford (RD), Wangaratta, Shepparton, Seymour, Gisborne	Melbourne		4,838	
7	1990		Bairnsdale	Paynesville, Maffra, Seaspray, Yarram (RD), Traralgon, Leongatha, Crib Point	Melbourne		3,807	
8	1991		Stawell	Lake Fyans, Dunkeld, Port Fairy (RD), Port Campbell, Apollo Bay, Anglesea, Bacchus Marsh	Melbourne		5,998	
9	1992		Numurkah	Cobram, Yarrawonga, Benalla, Mansfield (RD), Eildon, Yea, Whittlesea	Melbourne		4,676	
10	1993^{5}		Hartley NSW	Hartley NSW, Oberon NSW, Blayney NSW, Cowra NSW (RD), Boorowa NSW, Cootamunda NSW, Junee NSW, Holbrook NSW, Walwa VIC, Talgarno, Myrtleford (RD), Benalla, Euroa, Kilmore, Hurstbridge	Melbourne		3,500	
11	1994		Swan Hill	Kerang, Cohuna, Echuca (RD), Rushworth, Nagambie, Broadford, Hurstbridge	Melbourne		2,718	
12	1995		Mount Arapiles	Horsham, Balmoral, Dunkeld, Ararat (RD), Avoca, Daylesford, Bacchus Marsh	Melbourne		2,549	
13	1996		Dunkeld	Hamilton, Portland, Port Fairy, Port Campbell, Apollo Bay (RD), Torquay, Lara	Melbourne		3,135	
14	1997		Buchan	Orbost, Lakes Entrance, Paynesville, Sale, Yarram (RD), Inverloch, Leongatha, Koo Wee Rup, Victoria	Melbourne		2,167	
15	1998		Corowa NSW	Chiltern VIC, Myrtleford, Benalla, Mansfield, Alexandra (RD), Marysville, Yarra Glen	Melbourne		1,952	
16	1999		Echuca	Rochester, Bendigo, St Arnaud, Maryborough (RD), Castlemaine, Trentham, Riddells Creek	Melbourne		2,096	
17	2000		Macarthur	Port Fairy, Warrnambool, Port Campbell, Apollo Bay (RD), Anglesea, Queenscliff, Bacchus Marsh	Melbourne		2,642	
18	2001		Rutherglen	Wangaratta, Dederang, Bright (RD), Whitfield, Mansfield, Yea, Marysville	Lilydale		2,717	
19	2002		Warrock Homestead	Casterton, Hamilton, Halls Gap (RD), Stawell, Maryborough, Daylesford, Hanging Rock	Melbourne		2,626	Map
20	2003	Summit to Sea	Mount Hotham	Omeo, Bruthen, Briagolong, Glengarry, Yarram (RD), Inverloch, Crib Point	Mornington		3,574	
21	2004	The Great Ocean Road	Port Fairy	Koroit, Port Campbell, Camperdown, Gellibrand, Apollo Bay (RD), Aireys Inlet, Queenscliff	Geelong	591	8,100	
22	2005	River to River	Swan Hill	Murrabit, Cohuna, Echuca (RD), Heathcote, Newstead, Woodend, Whittlesea	Heidelberg	552	4,352	
23	2006	Jazz, Hills & Thrills	Wangaratta	Beechworth, Tallangatta, Mount Beauty, Myrtleford (RD), Whitfield, Mansfield, Yea	Whittlesea	534	3,651	
24	2007	Waves to Caves	Cowes, Phillip Island	Wonthaggi, Foster (RD), Yinnar, Rawson, Maffra, Paynesville	Buchan	544	3,747	
25	2008	The Grampians	Ballarat	Rokewood, Cobden, Mortlake, Dunkeld, Halls Gap (RD), Lake Bolac, Beaufort	Ballarat	590	4,200	Map
26	2009	The Great Ocean Road	Portland	Portland via Cape Bridgewater (loop), Macarthur, Port Fairy, Port Campbell, Apollo Bay (RD), Anglesea, Queenscliff	Geelong	552	5,000	Map
27	2010	Lakes, Rivers and Ranges	Yarrawonga	Dookie, Euroa, Murchison, Nagambie (RD), Seymour, Yea, Eildon	Marysville	589	4,350	Map
28	2011	The Mighty Murray and the Goldfields	Swan Hill	Swan Hill (loop), Kerang, Barham NSW, Echuca (RD), Boort, Wedderburn, Maryborough	Castlemaine	581	3,500	
29	2012	Lakes Entrance to Phillip Island	Lakes Entrance	Bruthen, Briagolong, Rosedale, Traralgon (RD), Yarragon, Mirboo North, San Remo	Penguin Parade, Phillip Island	590	3,852	Map
30	2013	The Great Ocean Road: Unmissable	Mount Gambier SA	Nelson VIC, Portland, Port Fairy, Port Campbell (RD), Gellibrand, Birregurra, Torquay	Geelong	610	5,242	Map
31	2014^{6}	Explore Bright and the High Country	Albury NSW^{6}	Yackandandah VIC, Bright, Moyhu, Mansfield (RD), Alexandra, Healesville	Lilydale	500	3,800	Map
32	2015	Rediscovering the Goldfields	Ballarat	Avoca, Dunolly, Inglewood, Bendigo (RD), Heathcote, Castlemaine	Bendigo	533	3,000	Map
33	2016	The Best of Both Worlds	Halls Gap	Dunkeld, Mortlake, The Twelve Apostles, Apollo Bay (RD), Surf Coast, Queenscliff	Geelong	500	4,200	Map
34	2017^{7}	Ride, Party, Camp, Repeat	Wilsons Promontory	Foster, Yarram, Seaspray, Bairnsdale (RD), Maffra, ~~Glengarry~~^{7}	~~Trafalgar~~^{7} Maffra	~~517~~^{7} 385	3,100	Map
35	2018	Mountains to Murray	Bright	Beechworth, Beechworth via Milawa (loop), Tallangatta, Rutherglen (RD), Yarrawonga, Glenrowan	Benalla	524	2,500	Map
36	2019	Limestone Coast to Great Ocean Road	Robe SA	Millicent, Mount Gambier, Portland VIC, Port Fairy (RD), Peterborough, Beech Forest, Deans Marsh	Torquay	652	3,000	Map
~~37~~	2020^{8}	~~Rainbow to Great Western~~	~~Rainbow~~^{8}	~~Brim, Horsham, Horsham via Natimuk (loop), Halls Gap (RD), Dunkeld, Pomonal~~^{8}	~~Great Western~~^{8}	~~532~~^{8} 0	0^{8}	
~~37~~	2021^{8}	~~Rainbow to Great Western~~	~~Rainbow~~^{8}	~~Brim, Horsham, Horsham via Natimuk (loop), Halls Gap (RD), Dunkeld, Pomonal~~^{8}	~~Great Western~~^{8}	~~532~~^{8} 0	0^{8}	
37	2022^{9}	The Little Vic	Halls Gap	Dunkeld, Halls Gap via Willaura & Pomonal	Great Western	235	<1,500	
38	2022^{10}	It's Great to be Back	Koroit	Noorat, Timboon, ~~Birregurra~~^{10} Colac, Apollo Bay (RD), Anglesea, Inverleigh	~~Buninyong~~^{10} Mount Helen	522	3,000	~~Map~~ Map
39	2023^{11}	Snowy to Sea	Orbost	Buchan, Lakes Entrance, Paynesville, Sale (RD), ~~Port Albert~~^{11} Yarram, Fish Creek	Wonthaggi	538^{11}	1,500	Guide

Notes:

RD: Signifies the town used for the rest day.
1: Routes were not officially named until 2003.
2: Distances are approximate for the full ride distance and as quoted in original Bicycle Network advertising literature.
3: Total number of riders as quoted by Bicycle Network; this includes riders who participated in shorter route options once these were introduced.
4: Route maps as created by Bicycle Network on Google Maps or the Bicycle Network site, starting in 2008.
5 The tenth anniversary ride in 1993 was run over two weeks with two rest days, the first week in NSW and second in Victoria. Riders could join for either or both weeks.
6: From 2014 the first day was tagged "arrival day" with no official riding, therefore effectively reducing the ride from eight days on the bike to seven days, with the first overnight 'stop' simply being the starting town.
7: In 2017 the final two days of the ride were cancelled due to the forecast of a "super-storm".
8: In 2020 the ride was cancelled due to the COVID-19 pandemic. The 2021 route was to replicate the cancelled 2020 ride, but it too was cancelled due to the pandemic.
10: The "Little Vic" was a three-day ride from Thurs, 31 Mar to Sun, 3 Apr 2022 as a replacement for the 2020/21 rides, and followed a section of those cancelled rides.
11: Minor route changes were made to the 2022 ride due to continual heavy rain prior to the event.
