= Bicycle Federation of Australia =

The Bicycle Federation of Australia (BFA) was the peak Australian body representing non-competitive cyclists, and directly represented over 20,000 cyclists who belonged to its affiliated groups in all states of Australia. Established in 1979 as a non-profit organisation, it advocated and lobbied Governments and the private sector for the several million Australians who ride bicycles for recreation, sport and transport. It discontinued its operations in February 2010.

== Structure ==
BFA was a member of the Cycling Promotion Alliance and was the Australian member of the European Cyclists' Federation. It previously published the Australian Cyclist magazine.

Member organisations included: Pedal Power ACT, Bicycle NSW, Bicycle Queensland, Bicycle South Australia, Bicycle Institute of South Australia, the Cyclists' Action Group and the Bicycle Transportation Alliance from Western Australia, Bicycle Tasmania, Bicycle NT, Wheels of Justice and the Vintage Cycle Club of Victoria Inc. In 1998 Bicycle Victoria, which has the largest membership of all Australian bicycle advocacy organisations, did not continue its affiliation with the BFA.

One of the last major acts of the BFA was to secure significant Federal funding from the Department of Health and Ageing for AustCycle. AustCycle is a joint venture between the Amy Gillett Foundation and Cycling Australia. AustCycle's role is to provide cycling training for all people who want to ride bikes for recreation and transport.

Since February 2010 there had been no peak body to represent non-competitive cyclists in Australia. In August 2013 Bicycle Network announced its intention to broaden nationally and now has offices in Melbourne and Hobart.

The Bicycle Federation of Australia website has been archived at the Australian National Library Pandora website as a site of digital significance.

== See also ==
- Cycling in Australia
- World Cycling Alliance
