= Velo-city =

Yearly cycle planning conference, organized by European Cyclists' Federation

Velo-city conference
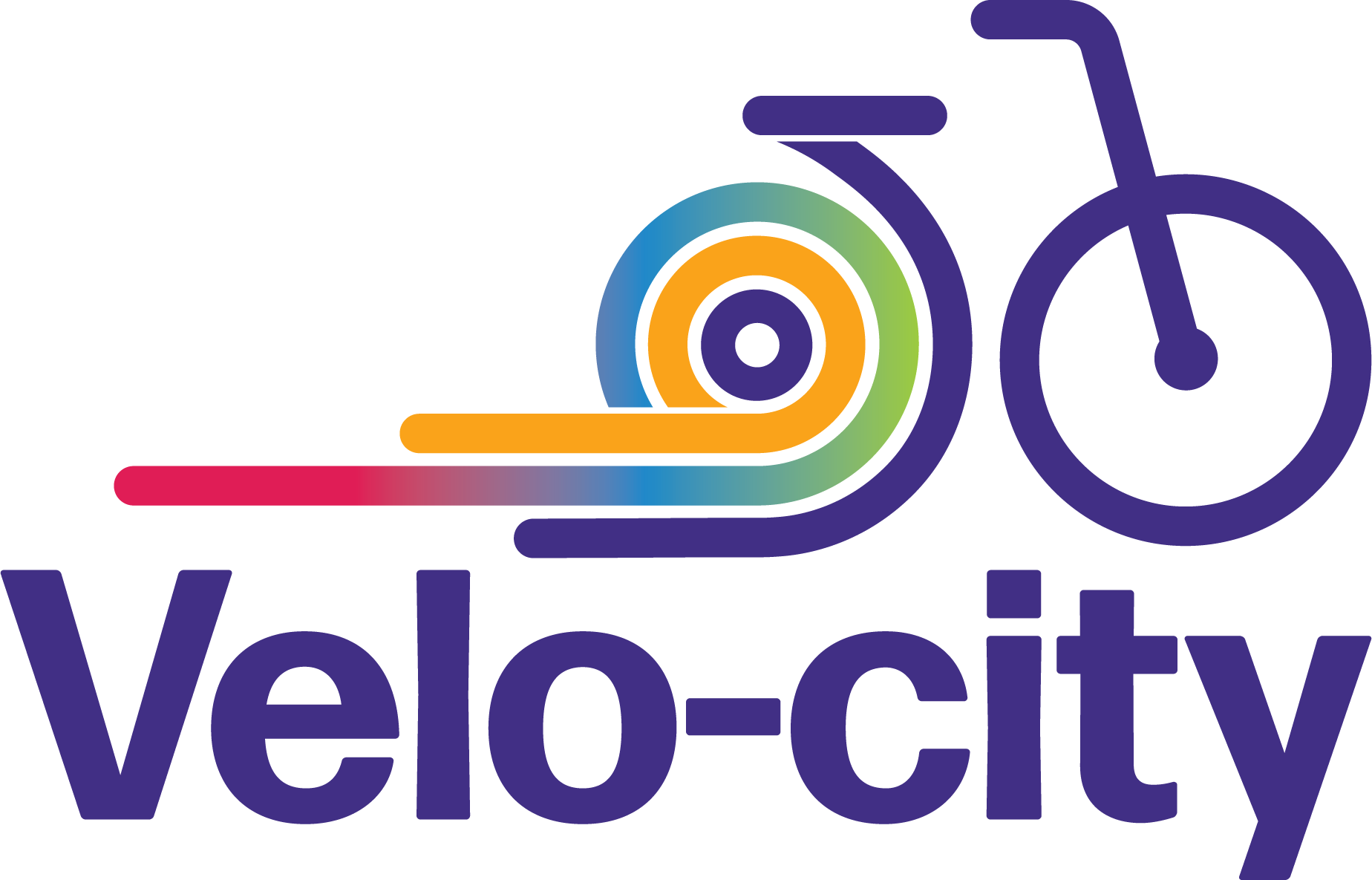
- Genre: Cycle planning conference
- Frequency: Annual
- Inaugurated: 1980 (Bremen, West Germany)
- Previous event: Velo-city 2026 Rimini
- Next event: Velo-city 2027 Ehime
- Organiser: European Cyclists' Federation
- Website: www.velo-city-conference.com

Velo-city or Velo-city Conference is a conference series of cycle planning conferences that started in 1980 in Bremen, where advocates, cities, decision makers, academics, researchers and industry leaders meet to shape the future of cycling.

As annual flagship event of the European Cyclists’ Federation, Velo-city plays a part in promoting cycling as a sustainable and healthy means of transport for all.

Hosted in a different city every year, the conference offers a knowledge-exchange and policy-transfer platform through its programme to more than 1600 Velo-citizens from over 60 countries involved in the policy, promotion of cycling, active mobility and sustainable urban development. In addition, the conference exhibition showcases the latest innovations for a better cycling experience. Answering the growing demand for expertise in cycling from cities, ECF has decided to hold an annual Velo-city conference in 2010.

== Selection process ==
The European Cyclists’ Federation conducts international bidding processes, encouraging cities committed to sustainable and active mobility to apply for future conferences. After a period when public and local authorities are allowed to bid, ECF Board is in charge of assessing the proposals of cities for the title according to criteria specified in candidacy.

Every year, a host city is chosen for the edition coming in a three years time.

== History ==
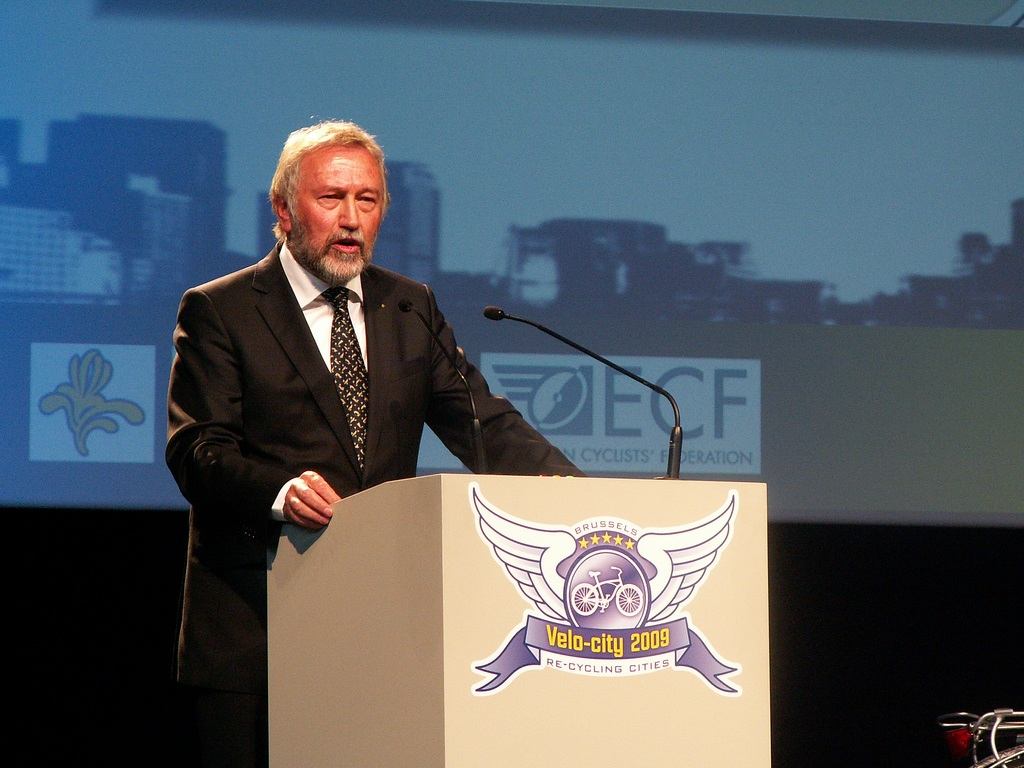
The German entrepreneur and cycling advocate Manfred Neun speaks at Velo-city in 2009

Hosted in a different city every year, the conference offers a knowledge-exchange and policy-transfer platform through its programme to more than 1600 Velo-citizens from over 60 countries involved in the policy, promotion of cycling, active mobility and sustainable urban development. In addition, the conference exhibition showcases the latest innovations for a better cycling experience.

Answering the growing demand for expertise in cycling from cities, ECF has decided to hold an annual Velo-city conference in 2010.

== List of host cities ==
Velo-city editions have been held in these locations with the following themes:

Year	City	Country	Theme
1980	Bremen	West Germany	
1984	London	United Kingdom	
1987	Groningen	Netherlands	Planning for the urban cyclist
1989	Copenhagen	Denmark	How to make people use the bicycle
1991	Milan	Italy	The bicycle: improving mobility and the environment in our cities
1992	Montreal	Canada	
1993	Nottingham	United Kingdom	
1995	Basel	Switzerland	The bicycle, symbol of sustainable transport
1996	Fremantle	Australia	Bicycles: A Global Solution to Local Problems
1997	Barcelona	Spain	Rediscovering the bicycle – strategies for a new mobility
1999	Graz; Maribor	Austria; Slovenia	The bicycle crossing frontiers
2000	Amsterdam	Netherlands	The versatile approach
2001	Edinburgh; Glasgow	United Kingdom	Partnership for Change
2003	Paris	France	The bicycle as an essential tool for winning the city back
2005	Dublin	Ireland	Delivering the vision
2007	Munich	Germany	From vision to reality
2009	Brussels	Belgium	Re-cycling cities
2010	Copenhagen	Denmark	Different Gears, Same Destinations
2011	Seville	Spain	The Cycle of Life
2012	Vancouver	Canada	Cities in Motion
2013	Vienna	Austria	The Sound of Cycling – Urban Cycling Cultures
2014	Adelaide	Australia	Celebration of Cycling
2015	Nantes	France	Cycling: Future Maker
2016	Taipei	Taiwan	Evolution of Cycling
2017	Arnhem and Nijmegen	Netherlands	Freedom of Cycling
2018	Rio de Janeiro	Brazil	Access to Life
2019	Dublin	Ireland	Cycling for the Ages
2021	Lisbon	Portugal	Cycle Diversity
2022	Ljubljana	Slovenia	Cycling the Change
2023	Leipzig	Germany	Leading the Transition
2024	Ghent	Belgium	Connecting through Cycling
2025	Gdańsk	Poland	Energizing Solidarity
2026	Rimini	Italy	Delivering the Urban Dream
2027	Ehime Prefecture	Japan	Kyōsei: Co-creating a Future with Cycling
2028	Geneva	Switzerland	

== Programme ==
Velo-city conferences feature a large programme composed by plenary sessions, parallel sessions, an exhibition of cycling innovations, the popular bike parade, technical visits and several social and side events.

Plenary sessions often involve high-level speakers such as influential voices in the fields of urban planning, local and national policy-making and cycling innovations. Parallel sessions offer a smaller scale setting for attendees to get actively involved in workshops, discussions, and practical activities. The Velo-city exhibition is the meeting point for industry actors and policymakers, showcasing the latest solutions in cycling infrastructure to better equip public spaces for cycling.

The bike parade is a public event organized during each Velo-city conference, gathering thousands of Velo-citizens and local residents to cycle together through the host city. Bike parades have often included entertainment along the parade's route, such as free concerts and shows to celebrate urban cycling.

Technical visits are organised by the host city to showcase the progress and challenges present at the local level. Such visits generally include a bike tour guided by a local expert and focus on innovative city infrastructure, on the use of data and technologies, or unique features of the host city.

== Gallery ==
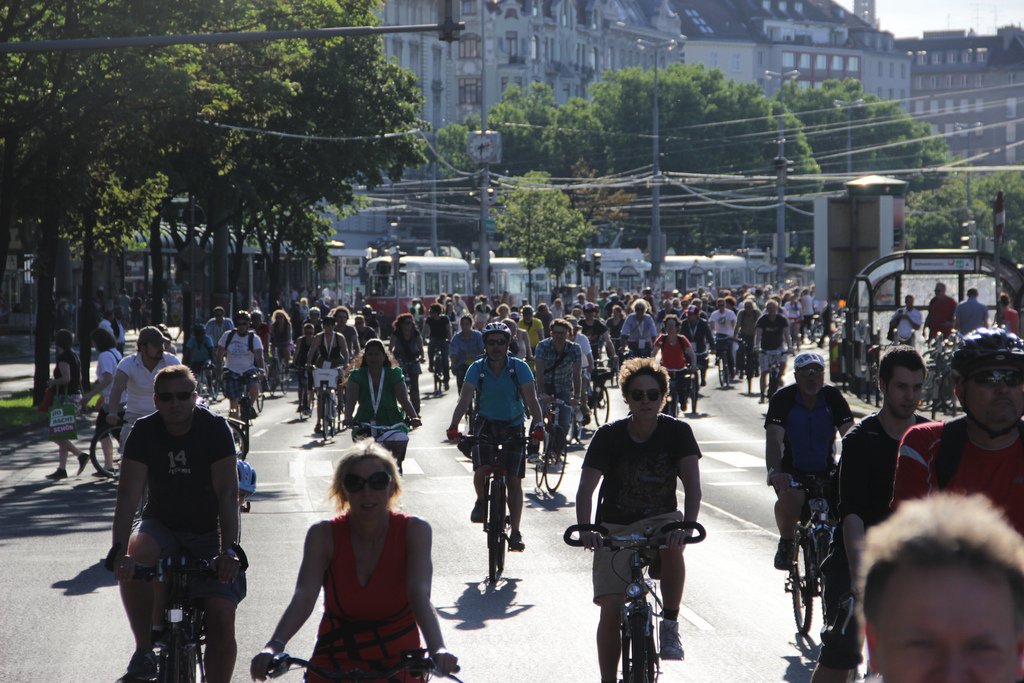
Velo-city's bike parade in Vienna with 4200 participants

Randy Neufeld at Velo-city 2012 Vancouver

Gil Penalosa at Velo-city 2011 Seville

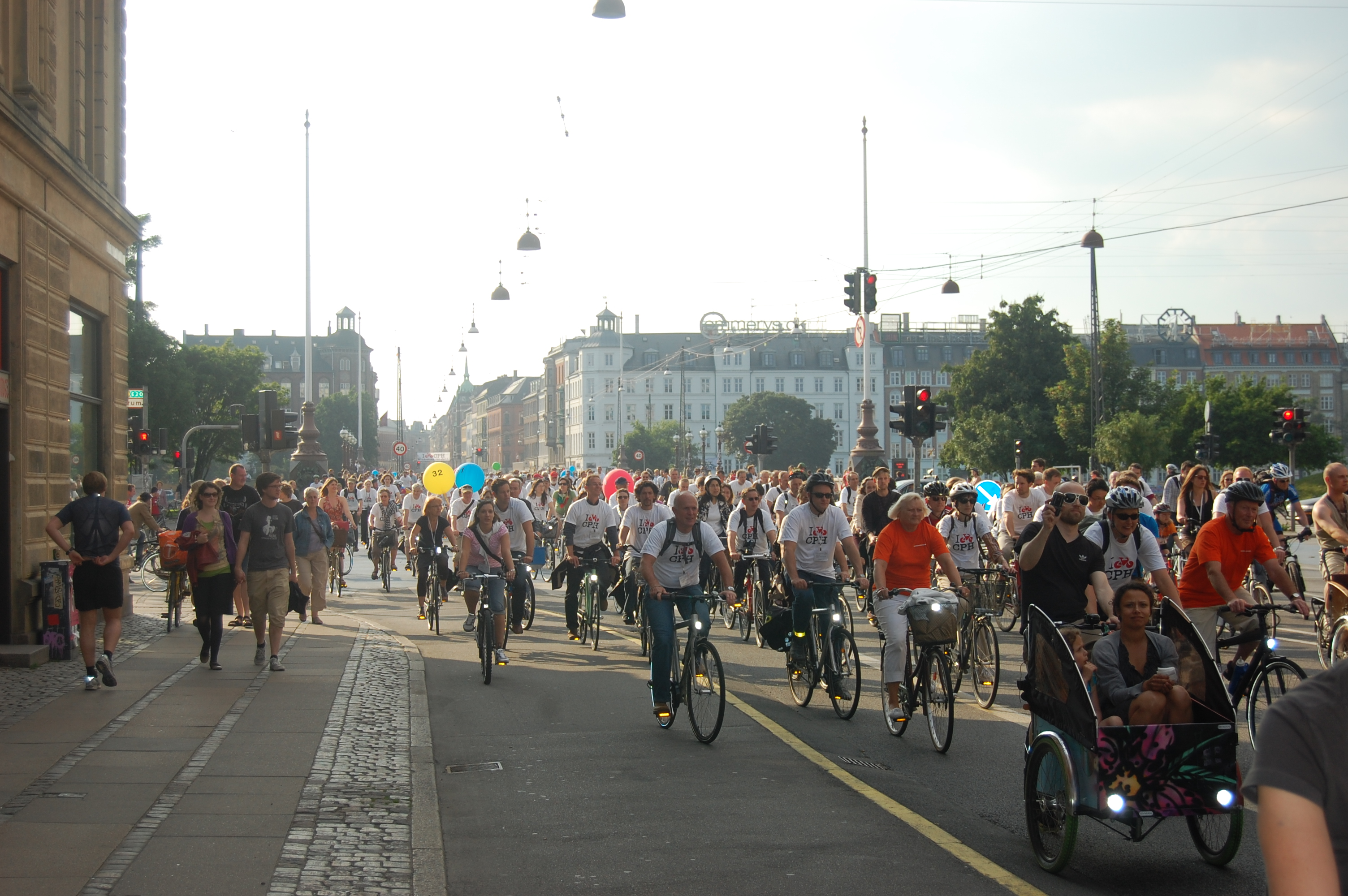
Bike Parade at Velo-city 2010 Copenhagen

Sam Adams speaking at Velo-city 2009 Brussels
