= Bicycle Network =

Australian cycling charity

- Bicycle Network logo
- Formation: 1975
- Type: Charity
- Location: Australia
- Members: 45,000
- Main organ: Board of Directors
- Staff: 37 permanent staff
- Volunteers: varies during year, estimated 50–500
- Website: www.bicyclenetwork.com.au

Bicycle Network is an Australian charity, one of the largest cycling membership organisations in the world (45,000 members, 2015), whose mission is to have More People Cycling More Often. Before 2011 it was known as Bicycle Victoria.

Bicycle Network is financially self-supporting and independent. It is primarily funded by its major events and membership subscriptions. Some events and programs receive specific government and commercial sponsorship, though Bicycle Network maintains financial independence as an organisation. This independence allows the organisation to lobby in the interests of bicycle riders without perceived external financial pressure, although this is debated by critics (see below).

Currently, Bicycle Network employs about 35 permanent staff and has a number of additional staff on contract for events and special projects, as well as using the services of volunteers for events. Alison McCormack became the first female CEO in 2022, succeeding Craig Richards, and has campaigned for increasing the numbers of women cyclists. Before Richards, Harry Barber had been the CEO since 1996. Bicycle Network has its head office in Melbourne, and an office in Hobart, Tasmania. They also have a workshop in Sunshine North, Victoria.

== History ==
=== 1970s ===
The organisation was established in 1975 as the Bicycle Institute of Victoria. It became an incorporated association in 1986 and a new constitution was adopted on 7 November 2005. Incorporation and the formal renaming of the organisation to Bicycle Victoria occurred on 5 December 2005.

The formation of the Bicycle Institute of Victoria in 1974 was instigated by Brian Dixon MP, Victorian State Government Minister for Youth, Sport and Recreation. Dixon, creator of the famous Life. Be in it. fitness campaign, brought together a group of bicycle advocates, including Keith Dunstan, to help form the BIV. Dunstan went on to become the founding president of the institute. Rupert Hamer's Government also formed the State Bicycle Committee (SBC) which was originally within the Ministry of Transport. Under Dixon, the SBC reported directly to the Minister. Only after about 1990 did it have to report through VicRoads.

When Bicycle Victoria was founded in 1975, the renaissance of cycling in Australia was gathering momentum. Bikes were becoming popular again for recreation and cyclists were becoming accepted on the road once more. Founding president, Keith Dunstan, records in his memoir Confessions of a Bicycle Nut: "By the late 70s I was called a '—–– idiot' only once a month instead of every day".

In April 1976, the first edition of the newsletter Pedal Power announced that the fledgling Bicycle Institute of Victoria aimed to cater "for the need of the majority of cyclists who urgently need safe, convenient and pleasant places to ride". The chief campaigners were Dunstan and Alan Parker, who immediately began pressuring State and local government on everything from lanes on roads to citywide planning.

In 1978, the Victorian government approved a $1.6 million, five-year Geelong Bikeplan as a test case for bike planning in Victoria. The plan proposed programs of education, enforcement and encouragement as well as engineering for cycling. Ted Wilson of the Geelong police was key in the plan's implementation. He worked on getting cyclists to comply with the road rules and encouraged police to look out for cyclists on the road. By way of education and encouragement, he taught the newly developed Bike Ed program in schools around Victoria, a program he loves and is still involved with.

Wilson also suggested re-establishing Police Bicycle Patrols in Victoria. The idea was written into the Melbourne Bikeplan in the late 70s and subsequent plans developed for centres on Victoria but did not come to fruition until 1990. Once again Geelong was the site for the trial and Wilson was charged with training police in bike skills. Now all police areas across Victoria are equipped to run Bicycle Patrols when they fit the bill.

With conditions for cyclists steadily improving, cycling clubs began popping up all over Victoria. One of the oldest and largest was the Melbourne Bicycle Touring Club (MBTC). Founded in 1973 as "Action Unlimited" and changing to MBTC in about 1976, it soon became affiliated with Bicycle Victoria. One of the early members of MBTC was Ian Christie, who went on to run the renowned shop Christie Cycles for 22 years.

=== 1980s ===
Ian Christie sees the 1980s as the period when cycling really began to take off. He credits this to cycling gaining a name as a great health pursuit at this time and the newly invented mountain bike. It wasn't an innovation he had much faith in at the time. As a project manager for Bicycle Industries Australia, Christie was often asked about current trends in the cycling industry. He laughs, "I'm still making forecasts but I remind people that I was the one who said mountain bikes would never take off."

Past president of the Bicycle Institute of Victoria, Charlie Farren, concurs that the 1980s saw a tremendous boost in recreational cycling in the state. Her involvement with the organisation coincided with the development of the Great Victorian Bike Ride from the 1984 first ride when over 2000 people rode from Wodonga to Melbourne.

That first Great Victorian Bike Ride in 1984 was meant to be a one-off celebration of the 150th anniversary of European settlement of Victoria but it was such a hit that cyclists demanded another event the following year. Farren sees the Great Bike Rides as one of the most significant tools in the development of cycling in Victoria. "The events that Bicycle Victoria have nurtured have put enormous numbers of Victorians on bikes and they have ended up as sympathetic car drivers", she points out. "I’m proud to have been a part of that".

In 1988 the Bicycle Institute of Victoria adopted the trading name of Bicycle Victoria.

=== 1990s ===
The first Round the bay ride took place in 1993, with manual timekeeping and riders were asked to bring a spanner to remove pedals while crossing the Bay entrance on rented fishing trawler. Harry Barber became CEO in 1996.

=== 2000s ===
Infrastructure for Cycling in Melbourne continues to be improved by the campaigns and advocacy of Bicycle Network, including the development of many on road bike lanes and shared use Melbourne cycle trails, such as the Federation Trail following the route of the disused sewer between Footscray and Werribee. In September 2007, Bicycle Victoria, Bicycle NSW, Bicycle Queensland and Bicycle South Australia announced the formation of the Bicycle Coalition; an agreement to work together on several projects such as National Ride to Work Day.

=== 2010s ===
In July 2011, Bicycle Victoria changed its name to Bicycle Network Victoria for the interim, a two-step name change towards their rebranding as Bicycle Network in 2013.

In 2011, Bicycle Network Victoria began a campaign - opposed by the Australian Taxation Office - to become a Health Promotion Charity. This campaign succeeded in getting Bicycle Network Victoria registered as charity, although not as a "health promotion charity" and so without the right to Deductible Gift Recipient (DGR) status.

In August 2013, Bicycle Network Victoria changed its name to Bicycle Network, which reflected its now nationwide reach.

== Membership ==
Bicycle Network Membership provides bike riders with support through benefits including insurance and enables them to contribute to improving conditions for bike riders.

Membership of Bicycle Network is open to the public and is subscription-based. Membership is a source of income for the organisation. Benefits of being a member include discounts at bike shops, crash insurance, bi-monthly membership magazine, maps, advice services and other bike-riding resources.

Ride On (formerly BVnews) is Bicycle Network's bi-monthly member magazine. Ride On provides all bike riders with bike related information.

== Annual Cycling Events ==
A large portion of Bicycle Network's funding comes from an extensive calendar of fully supported bicycle rides and events. These events also encourage cycling.

=== Great Victorian Bike Ride ===
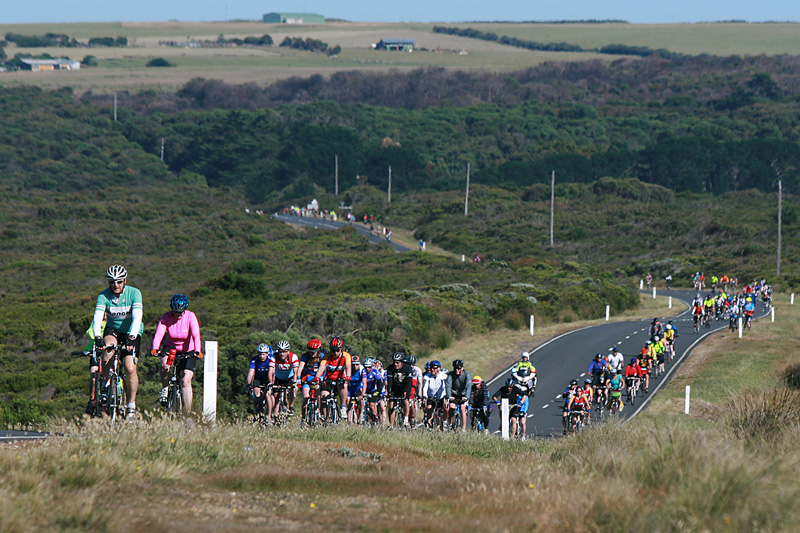
Riders stretch along the Great Ocean Road near Port Campbell on the 2009 Great Victorian Bike Ride

The Great Victorian Bike Ride (GVBR), commonly known as The Great Vic, is a non-competitive fully supported nine-day annual bicycle ride organised by Bicycle Network. The Great Vic takes different routes around the Victorian countryside of each year. The total ride distance is usually in the range of 550 kilometres (340 mi), averaging about 70 kilometres (43 mi) a day excluding the rest day. The ride first ran in 1984, attracting 2,100 riders in what was initially supposed to be a one-off event, but due to its unexpected popularity and success it subsequently became an annual event. The Great Vic typically draws several thousand participants each year, with a record of 8,100 riders in 2004, which makes it one of the world's largest supported bike rides.

It has been called by The Age newspaper as "Arguably the world's greatest one-week cycling holiday".

=== Around the Bay in a Day ===
Around the Bay in a Day is a popular single-day cycling event around Port Phillip Bay in Victoria. Around the Bay in a Day enables all bike riders to participate in Australia's largest single day bike ride and meet the challenge of riding around a physical landmark. In October 2008 more than 16,000 riders participated in this ride.

=== Peaks Challenge Falls Creek ===
The Peaks Challenge (formerly 3 peaks challenge) is a difficult cycling event held in the Australian alps region of Victoria. The route is 235 km long and incorporates climbs of more than 4,400 vertical metres. The circuit is similar to a Tour de France stage with three major climbs - Tawonga Gap, Mount Hotham and Falls Creek. In March 2016, nearly 2,000 riders participated with 88% of riders completing the circuit within the 13 hour deadline.

=== Great Escapade ===
The Great Escapade is an inter-state (or occasionally overseas) cycling holiday now run by Bicycle Victoria is similar in format to the Great Victorian Bike Ride. The event is usually about nine days, but varies up to about two weeks if the location is further from Victoria. The 2008 Great Escapade was in New South Wales, through the Blue Mountains and Hunter Valley. In April 2008 the online publication Pushon reported that BNSW Board would support future Great Escapade rides instead of running their own multi-day event, the NSW Big Ride. This news has created discussion and criticism amongst NSW cyclists and past participants.

=== National Ride to Work Day ===
National Ride to Work Day program is a behaviour change program that encourages workers to feel good and have fun by commuting to work by bike and experiencing the health, financial and environmental benefits. The event encourages individuals and also workplace teams to participate. Information is provided to help workplaces build facilities and develop policies to support employees who cycle to work. In October 2006, 10,000 first-time riders and regular commuters registered prior to the event. An estimated 30,000 took part on the day throughout Victoria.

== Other events ==
Several other events have been run in the past, including:

- Great Melbourne Bike Ride: in March 2003, 14,000 people participated in this event including the premier Steve Bracks, eclipsing the previous Australian record for a mass bike ride of 11,000 riders in 1992.

== Relationship with other cycling organisations ==
From 1979 the organisation was a member of the peak Australian body representing non-competitive cyclists, the Bicycle Federation of Australia, but discontinued its affiliation during 1998.

On 7 August 2007 the Australian cycling sector which included the Cycling Promotion Fund, Bicycle Industries Australia, Cycling Australia, Retail Cycle Traders Australia and the Bicycle Federation of Australia launched its key asks in Canberra for the upcoming 2008 federal election. Bicycle Victoria was one of the peak organisations included in these key requests. but did not participate in the cycling sector's federal election campaign.

Bicycle Network is not a partner of the Amy Gillet Foundation (http://www.amygillett.org.au)

Local bicycle groups (known as Bicycle User Groups, or BUGs) which campaign in local areas for improvements, organise rides, bike education and maintenance workshops and provide a grassroots basis for wider bicycle campaigns - were established by Bicycle Victoria in 1990. However, this relationship was subsequently discontinued. Bicycle Network Victoria sometimes works with these groups on projects like the "Super Tuesday" bike count. Relationships with BUGs have been uneven. Bicycle Victoria's support of the Grand Prix at Albert Park (1993) led to resignations of many key BUG members across Victoria (see below).

== Controversies ==
=== Albert Park Grand Prix ===
Bicycle Victoria's support of the Grand Prix at Albert Park (1993) was unsurprisingly controversial. BV also ran the Great Melbourne Bike Ride around the circuit in 1996, prior to the first Grand Prix, thus apparently conferring the support of cyclists upon the race. Some local BUG members resigned their BV memberships. This period also saw the loss of resourcing of local BUGs by BV.

=== Free bikes for ride entrants ===
Bicycle Victoria offered entrants of the 2004 Great Victorian Bike Ride a bike, free of charge, if they registered early for the event. The bikes were imported and distributed by Bicycle Victoria. The bikes were available fully assembled, or partially assembled in a box.

Retail Cycle Traders Australia and Bicycle Industries Australia did not approve, saying that the deal was harmful to retail business, the bikes were of low quality and cost the community and environment as waste disposal.

The bikes were also subject to a safety recall, which required a replacement front quick-release skewer.

=== "Hell Ride" controversy ===
In August 2006, the death of pedestrian James Gould, as a result of a collision with a cyclist riding in the weekly "Hell Ride", saw a prolonged media backlash against the perceived bad behaviour of some Melbourne cyclists. Some considerate and law-abiding cyclists felt that the condemnation was unfair, and were critical of public statements made by Bicycle Victoria CEO, Harry Barber.

=== Bikes on trains ban ===
From 1 January 2008, bicycles were banned from most Victorian train services during peak hour, including peak direction suburban trains. The statement on Bicycle Victoria's website said that the organisation supported the ban. An effective grassroots campaign against the ban quickly formed, and shortly thereafter Bicycle Victoria reversed its position and apologised, stating that it had not actually supported the ban in the first place. (The ban was overturned 6 weeks after its introduction by the Transport Minister).

=== Subaru promotion to members ===
In April 2008, Bicycle Victoria began a cross promotion with Subaru dealers in Melbourne. The deal offered free bike maps and bike pumps to Bicycle Victoria members who test rode Subaru 4WD's. It is assumed the Bicycle Victoria receives advertising revenue from the promotion. Some criticised this promotion, seeing it as pro-car and against the mission of the organisation. Others believe that the promotion is within the mission, as the majority of members also own and use a motor vehicle.

=== Helmet laws and fines ===
In late 2018 Bicycle Network issued a major report on the issue and several press releases and policy recommendations. The 2018 report was based on a 20,000 person survey of members and non-members, and consultation of experts and scholarly studies. Around 60% of the respondents thought the laws should be relaxed. But the recommendation of the report is to call for partial relaxation only: "... in low risk environments where there are no cars, such as on paths and trails, we believe adults should be trusted to decide whether they wear a helmet or not. Accordingly, Bicycle Network is recommending that: Australia’s MHL be relaxed with a five-year trial permitting people over the age of 17 to ride on footpaths and cycle paths without a helmet." This provoked backlash on both sides, across the country.

Bicycle Victoria supported Australia's compulsory bike helmet laws until the 2018 report. Bicycle Victoria actively supported the increase in fines in 2010 to $146 for failing to wear a helmet (other fines on a bike also increased) in Victoria, claiming cyclists should be subjected to laws like other road users. Many cyclists were expecting BV would oppose the steep rise in fines. These and other issues have led critics to conclude that Bicycle Victoria was a mainstream health promotion organisation, with ties to government and major sponsors, and that it was wary of linking itself to any environmental protest or justice campaigns like those that challenge the helmet law. As noted above in mid 2011, Bicycle Victoria formally announced that it had altered its mission statement and name to become Bicycle Network, a health promotion organisation with charitable status, further alienating itself from those seeking freedom not to wear helmets in safe situations away from traffic dangers.

=== Partnership with Coca-Cola ===
In 2013 Bicycle Network announced that it would be entering into a partnership with Coca-Cola, to run a behaviour change program to get teenagers healthy and active. This is part of Coca-Cola's so called "worldwide push to combat obesity."

== See also ==
- World Cycling Alliance
