= European Cyclists' Federation =

Umbrella federation

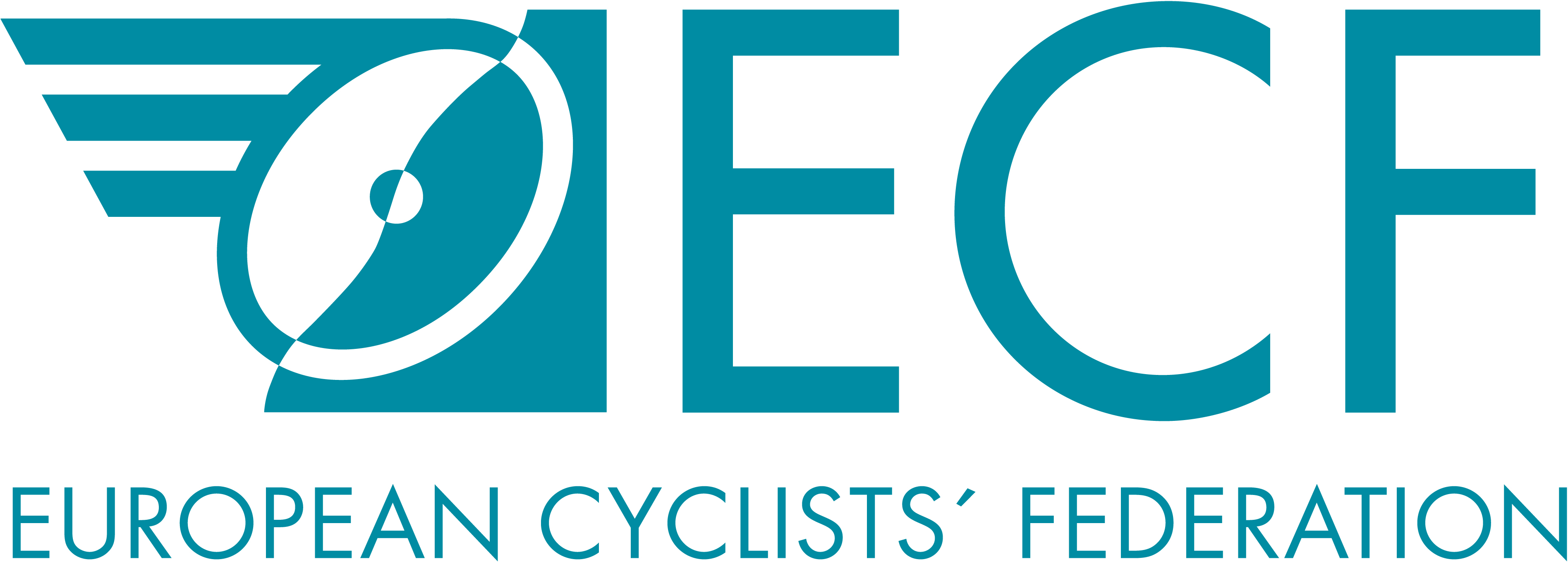
- Formation: 1983
- Type: NGO
- Purpose: "More and better cycling for all"
- Location: Brussels, Belgium
- Key people: Henk Swarttouw, President; Laurianne Krid, CEO
- Website: https://www.ECF.com

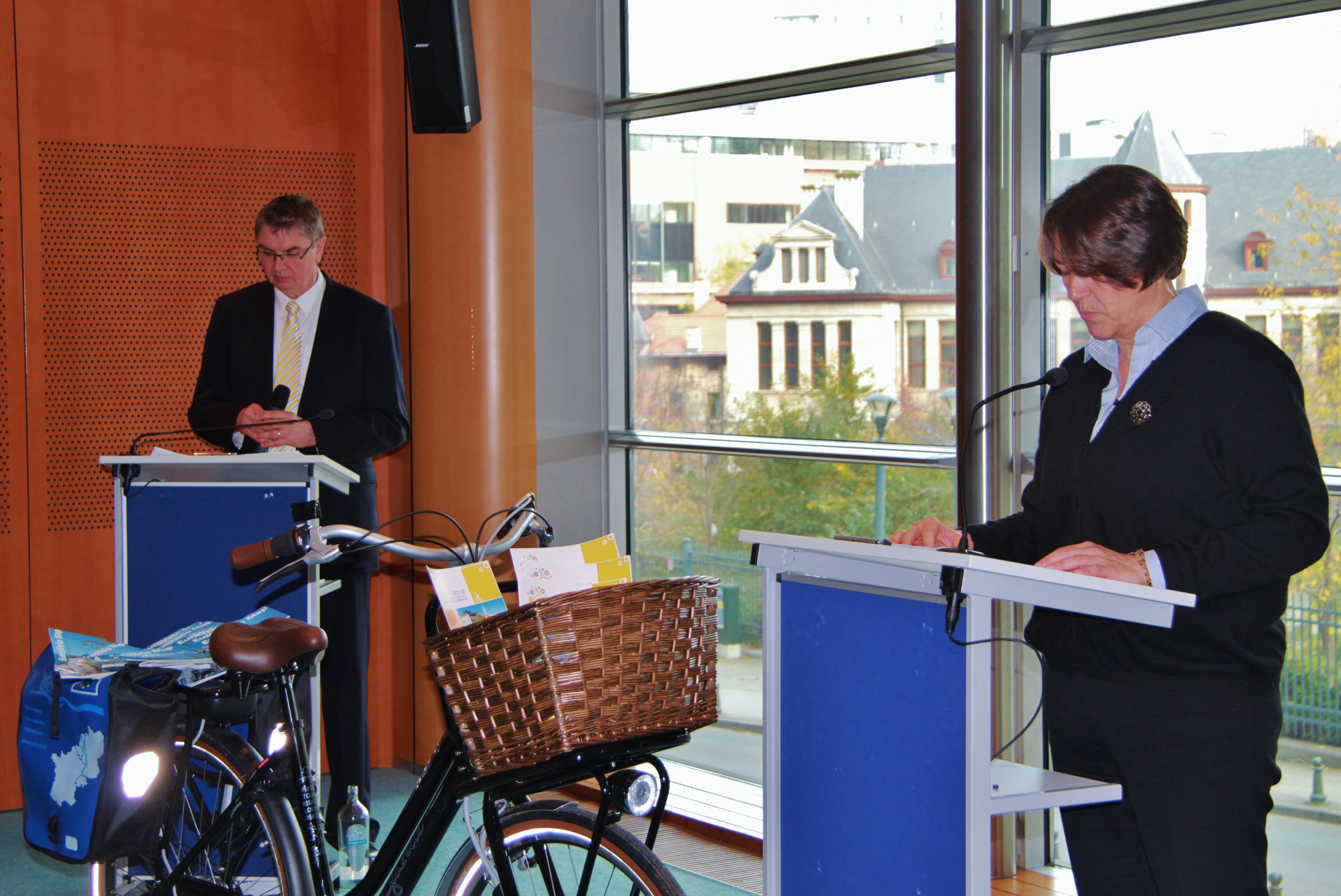
Cycling Forum Europe Inauguration, November 2014

The European Cyclists' Federation (ECF) is a non-profit member-based umbrella federation of local, regional and national civil society organisations that promote cycling for both transportation and leisure.

ECF has around 70 member organisations across more than 40 countries that it represents at the European level and internationally. ECF’s activities include conducting cycling advocacy and research, providing tools and resources, developing the EuroVelo network and organising the Velo-city conference series.

Based in Brussels and founded in 1983, ECF’s slogan is “more and better cycling for all.” In 2013 they founded the World Cycling Alliance.

== Organisation ==
ECF is a legal entity registered under Belgian law as an ASBL (non-profit organisation). Its statutes are published in the Moniteur Belge of 24 April 1997.

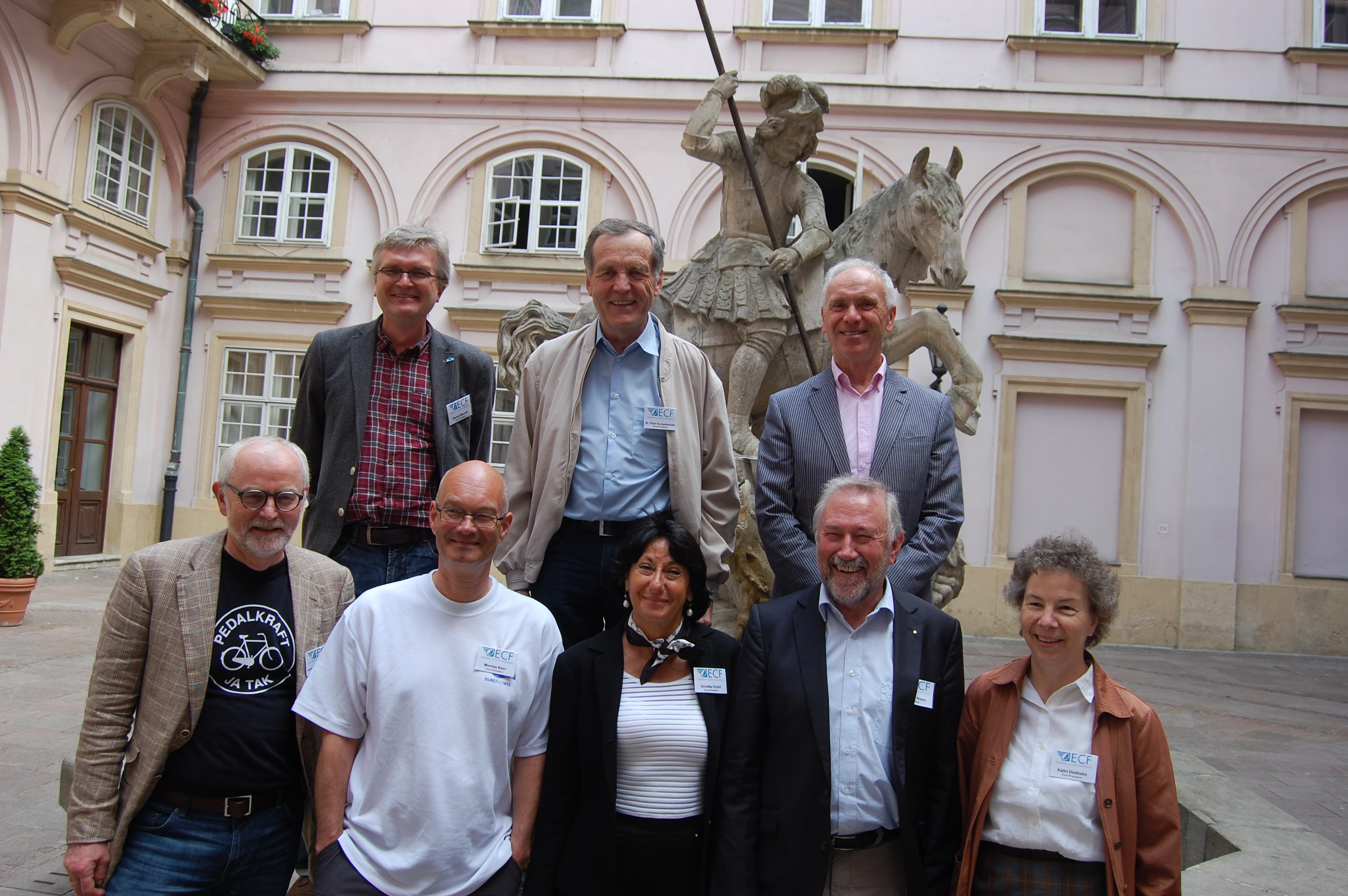
Picture of the 2013 ECF Board

ECF states that its vision is to “improve and increase cycling across the whole of Europe.” The organisation defines the following main goals for 2030:

- “Cycling levels in Europe should increase by at least 50% compared to 2017 levels.
- The rate of cyclists killed or seriously injured in road collisions should be reduced by at least 50% compared to 2019.
- Cycling should be prioritised by policymakers at all levels across Europe as a sustainable and healthy part of the mobility mix, not only for everyday cycling but also for recreational cycling and sustainable cycling tourism.
- Public investments in safe and comfortable infrastructure and other measures to improve and enable more cycling should increase greatly."

== Activities ==
=== Advocacy ===
As one of its primary activities, ECF works to influence legislation in favor of cycling. Apart from raising general awareness around the benefits of cycling, its advocacy involves lobbying and engaging with politicians, policymakers and other stakeholders at the EU and European level as well as international fora such as the United Nations Climate Change conference.

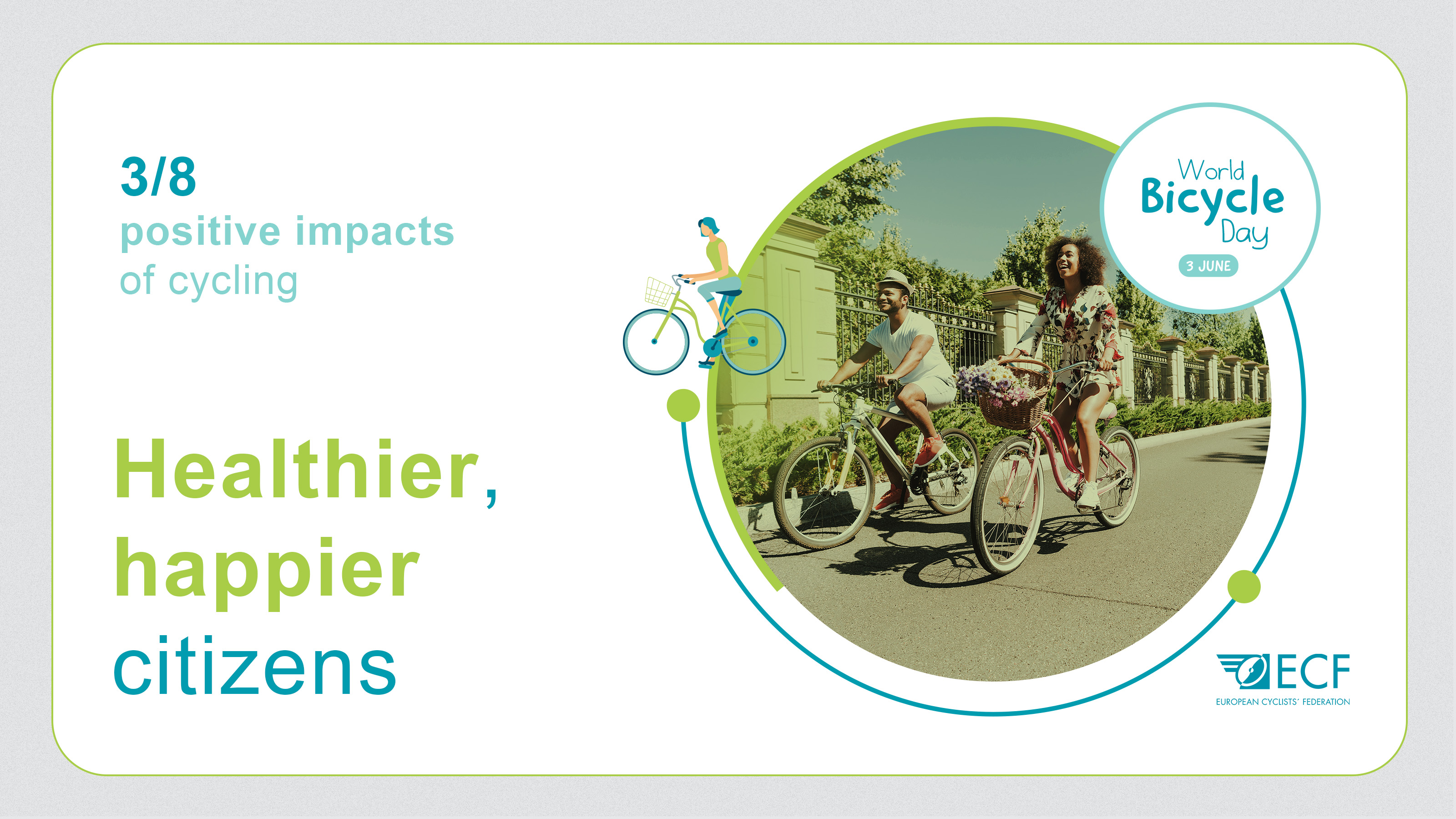
Graphic about one of the positive impacts of cycling, created for World Bicycle Day on 3 June 2021.

ECF defines seven policy areas for its advocacy:

- Modal shift
- Safety
- Cycling tourism and rural connectivity
- Infrastructure
- Cycling as part of urban mobility
- Thought leadership and knowledge transfer
- Cross-cutting issues

=== EuroVelo ===
EuroVelo is a network of 17 long-distance cycle routes that criss-cross Europe. As of 2025, more than 91,800 km (57,000 mi) of EuroVelo cycle routes were established, at different stages of development. EuroVelo routes are used by commuters, tourists and recreational cyclists.

The EuroVelo network was officially launched in Logroño on 21 November 1997, and its first route, the EuroVelo 12 – North Sea Cycle Route, was inaugurated in 2001.

EuroVelo is coordinated by ECF, while the development and operation of individual EuroVelo routes is carried out by National EuroVelo Coordination Centres and Coordinators, which are usually NGOs, commercial service providers or national, regional or local governments.

=== Velo-city ===
The Velo-city conference series, also known as the annual world cycling summit, is organised by ECF with a different host city every year. Velo-city brings together civil society organisations, cities, academics, experts and the cycling industry to discuss and share the latest ideas and developments from the world of cycling for transport and leisure.

Each conference takes place with a particular theme over the course of four days with a programme that consists of plenary sessions, side sessions, an exhibition area, technical visits, social events and a bike parade. Bringing together all those who are involved in the policy, promotion and provision of cycling, Velo-city conferences usually attract around 1,400 delegates, including cycling advocates, cities, decisionmakers and industry leaders.

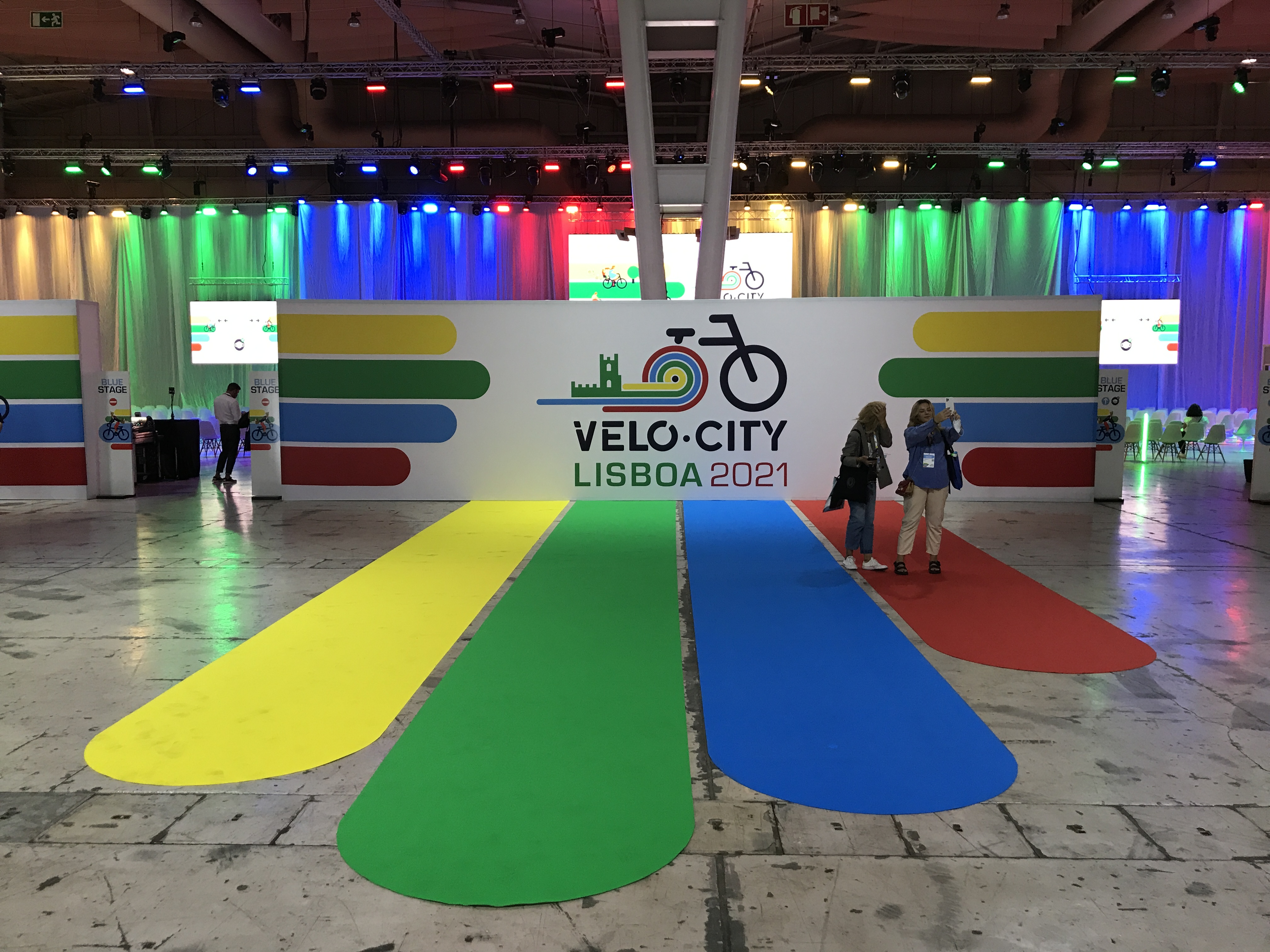
The main exhibition hall at Velo-city 2021 Lisboa

Velo-city began in 1980 and has played an important part in the promotion of cycling ever since. Since the first Velo-city Global took place in Copenhagen in 2010, the conference has taken place in numerous locations:

- 2011: Seville
- 2012: Vancouver
- 2013: Vienna
- 2014: Adelaide
- 2015: Nantes
- 2016: Taipei
- 2017: Arnhem-Nijmegen
- 2018: Rio de Janeiro
- 2019: Dublin
- 2021: Lisbon
- 2022: Ljubljana
- 2023: Leipzig
- 2024: Ghent
- 2025: Gdansk
- 2026: Rimini
- 2027: Ehime Prefecture
- 2028: Geneva

Velo-city 2020 Ljubljana was forced to be postponed to 2022 as a result of the COVID-19 pandemic. Because of the pandemic, Velo-city 2021 Lisboa was held with special COVID-19 safety protocols and as a hybrid event with online and digital elements that included live streaming and session recordings within a dedicated mobile app.

=== Projects ===
ECF participates in various EU-funded projects together with other organisations and institutions.

== Networks ==
ECF manages several international networks, apart from its own members:

=== Cities & Regions for Cyclists ===
The Cities & Regions for Cyclists network is managed by ECF and consists of cities and regions, mainly in Europe, that work to “promote the bicycle as a mode of transport and leisure.”

=== Cycle-Friendly Employer Consortium ===
The Cycle-Friendly Employer Certification Framework is a “European standard for cycle friendly companies.” The certification scheme is run by ECF and implemented on the national level by national coordinators.

=== Scientists for Cycling ===
The Scientists for Cycling group works to exchange their knowledge and research in order to improve cycling. The main aims of the network are: to build a strong academic community doing research on cycling-related topics; to bridge the gap between the research on cycling issues, cycling advocates and decision makers; to disseminate the latest academic publications on cycling; to assist in developing the Velo-city conference program; to build up a more research based approach to cycling advocacy and policy.

== Members ==
ECF is a member-based organisation with around 70 full and associate members in over 40 countries. The organisation claims to be “the world’s largest and best-known cyclists’ advocacy organisation.”

Full membership is open to European associations of cycle users. Full members are entitled to vote at the ECF Annual General Meetings (AGM).

Associate membership is open to:

- European organisations that do not meet the criteria for full membership but support the aims of ECF
- Cycling organisations from outside Europe
- Other bodies with an interest in cycling

Associate members pay the subscription, receive material and may attend the AGM or working groups meetings but do not have voting rights.

== See also ==
- Bicycle Network, Australian body for all cyclists
- Bicycle-friendly
- Cycling UK, charitable organisation supporting cyclists and promoting bicycle use
- EuroVelo
- The Street Trust, U.S. organisation advocating safety and ease of biking, walking and riding public transit in communities
- Union Cycliste Internationale, international sport governing body for competitive cycling
- Velo-city
- World Bike Forum
