= Culture of Melbourne =

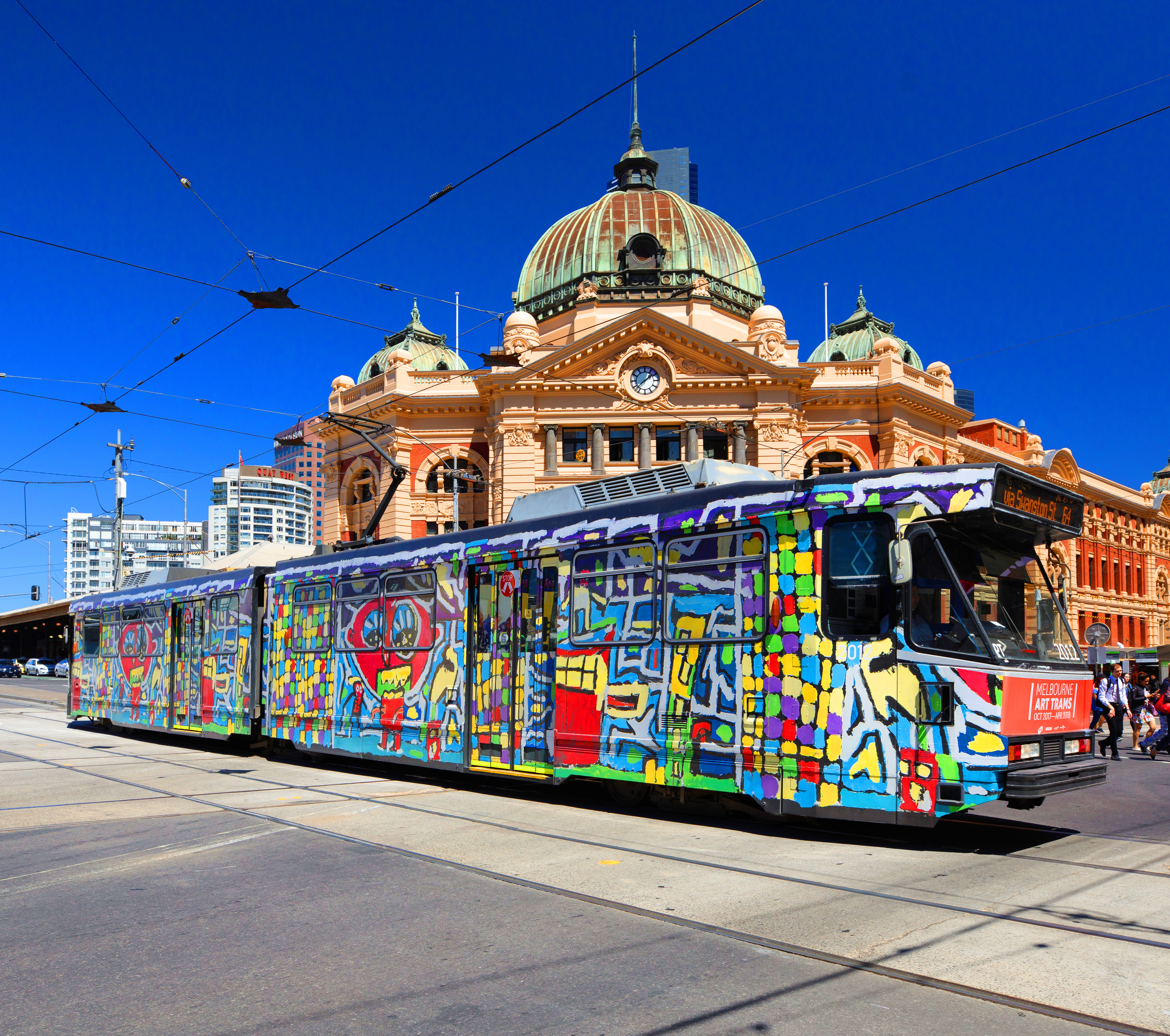
An art tram passing by Flinders Street station

The culture of Melbourne, the capital of the Australian state of Victoria, encompasses the city's artistic, culinary, literary, musical, political and social elements. Since its founding as a British settlement in 1835, Melbourne has been culturally influenced by European culture, particularly that of the British Isles. During the 1850s Victorian gold rush and in the decades that immediately followed, immigrants from many other parts of the world, notably China and the Americas, helped shape Melbourne's culture. Over time, Melbourne has become the birthplace of a number of unique cultural traits and institutions, and today it is one of the world's most multicultural and multiracial cities.

Traditionally acclaimed as Australia's "cultural capital", Melbourne topped the Economist Intelligence Unit's annual ranking of the world's most liveable cities throughout much of the 2010s, based in part on its cultural attributes.

== Overview ==
Melbourne hosts and supports many cultural institutions, such as museums, galleries, events, festivals, public/street art, popular music, live music, film, independent music and literary talks, independent film and fashion. The city celebrates a wide variety of major annual cultural events, including local, national and international events. A number of cultural hubs also exist in the city, including the Victorian Arts Precinct, with its distinctive spire, and Federation Square, one of the city's main cultural hubs and tourist centres that celebrated its ten-year anniversary in 2012. Federation Square's distinctive architecture, large digital screen and public space attracts congregations, rallies and public audiences for sporting events.

== Arts ==
=== Architecture ===
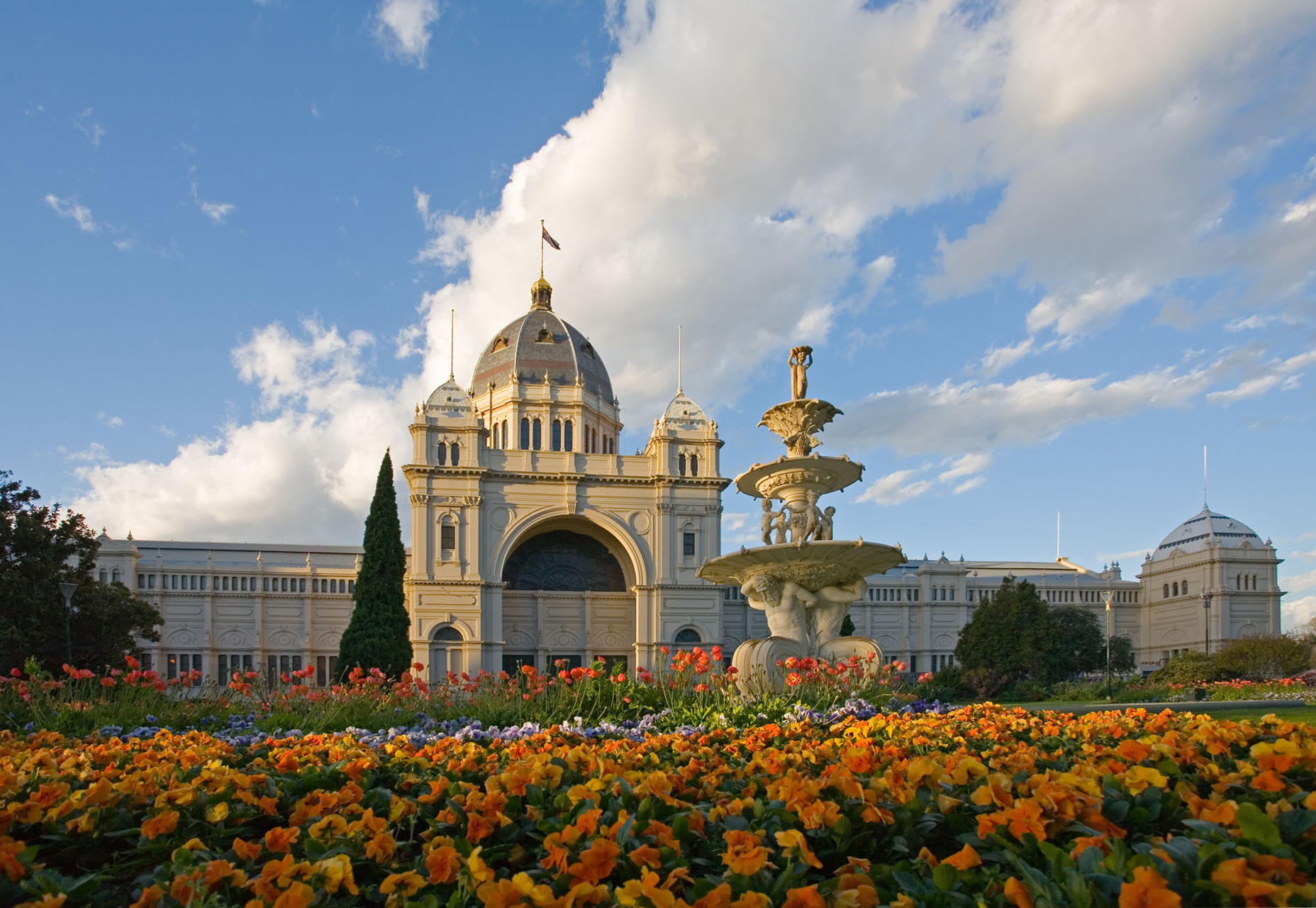
The Royal Exhibition Building from the main avenue of the Carlton Gardens

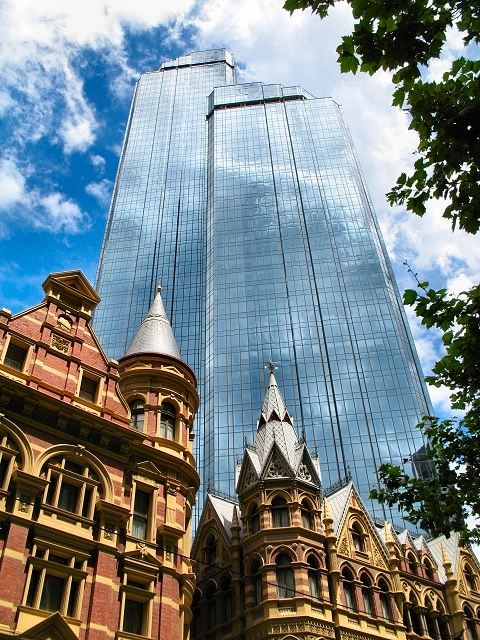
Victorian architecture dwarfed by the Rialto Towers

Melbourne's buildings and structures feature a wide variety of architectural designs, and the city is home to the Royal Exhibition Building, the first Australian building to be listed on the World Heritage Register.

Australia's second oldest architectural firm, and one of the world's oldest, Bates Smart, is based in Melbourne.

Some of Australia's most prolific architects have originated from Melbourne, including Joseph Reed, William Wardell, John James Clark, Charles D'Ebro, Charles Webb, William Pitt, Nahum Barnet, Harry Norris, Sir Roy Grounds and Robin Boyd. In recent years, Melbourne has produced internationally recognised architectural firms, including Denton Corker Marshall, Fender Katsalidis, Daryl Jackson and Peddle Thorp, as well as local award-winning trendsetters, Edmund & Corrigan, Ashton Raggatt McDougall and Wood Marsh.

=== Literature ===
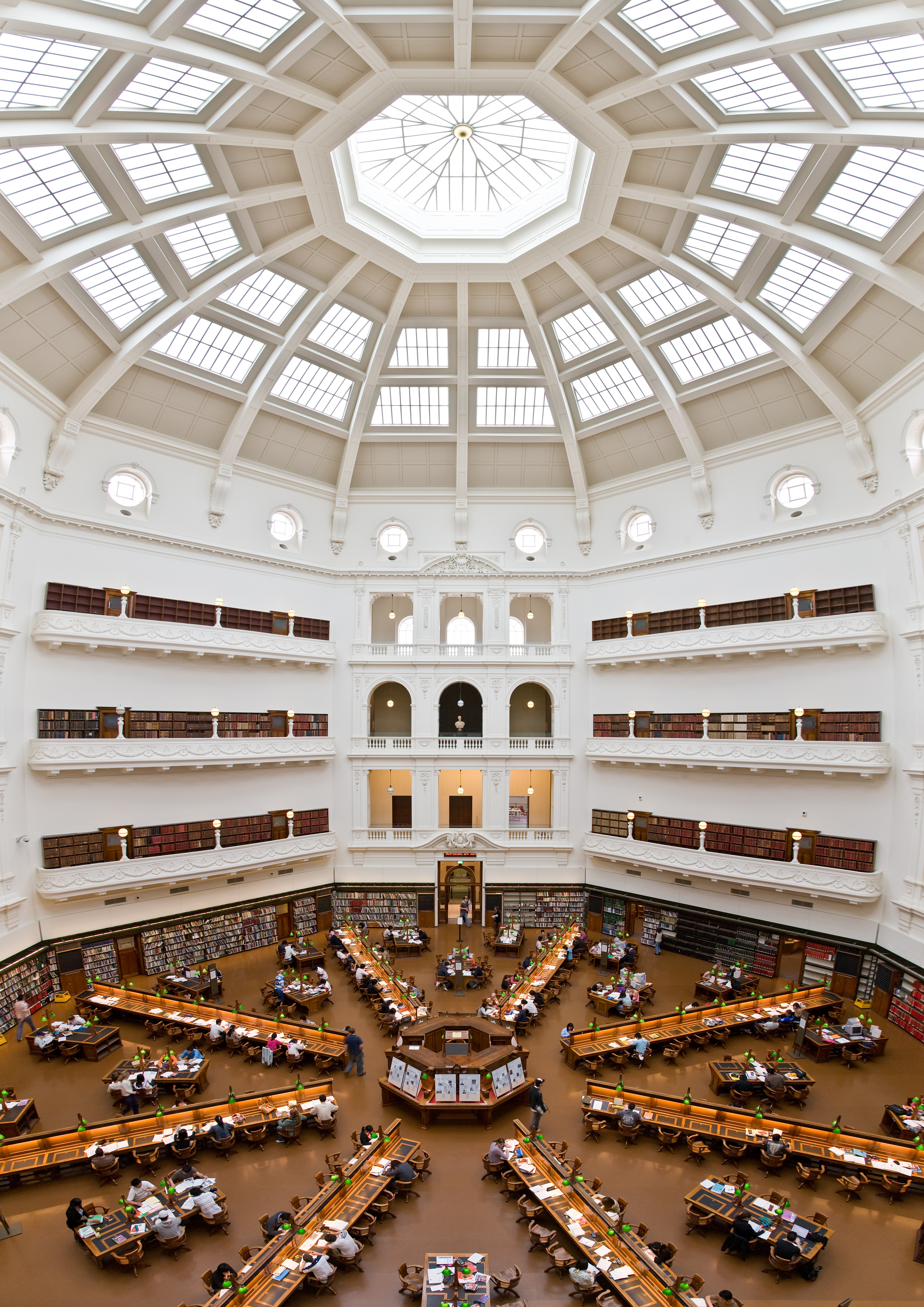
The La Trobe Reading Room in the State Library of Victoria

Melbourne's literary history is rich and diverse. The State Library of Victoria was the first major cultural institution to be established in Melbourne since its founding in 1854, and is one of Australia's oldest cultural institutions. The library holds more than two million books and 16,000 serials, and is a part of an extensive network of public and university libraries across the city. A wide range of independent bookstores also exist in the city, as well as a variety of larger bookstore chains, and in 1960, the first children's bookstore in Australia, The Little Bookroom, was opened. The Foreign Language Bookshop is the oldest and largest language bookshop in Australasia, established in 1938 in Bourke Street as a free lending library. The primary aim of the business was to reduce migrant isolation, particularly for European migrants disembarking from ships into Australia.

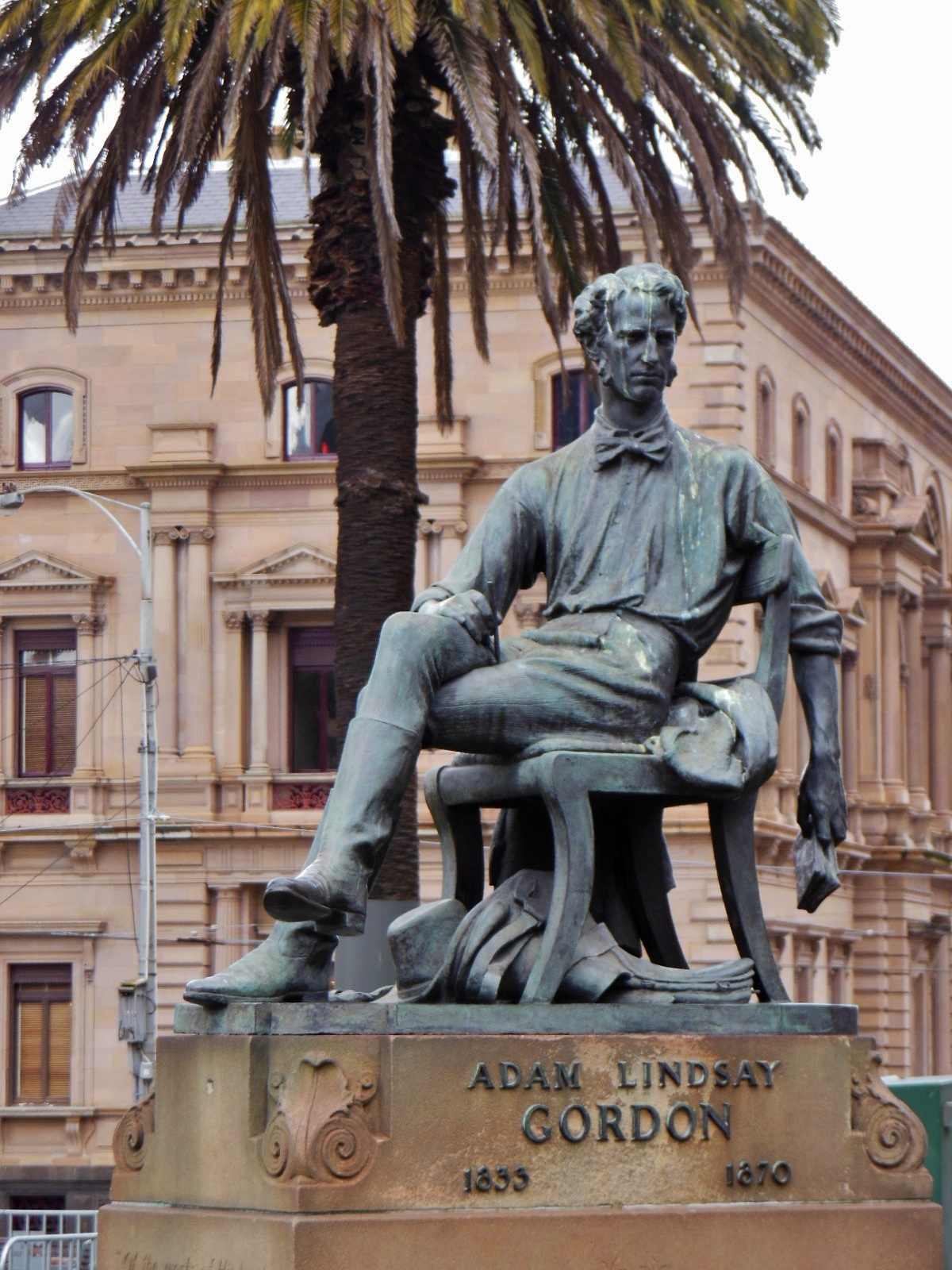
Statue of Adam Lindsay Gordon in Gordon Reserve

In the decades following the gold rush, Melbourne was Australia's undisputed literary capital, famously referred to by Henry Kendall as "that wild bleak Bohemia south of the Murray". During this time, Melbourne-based writers and poets Adam Lindsay Gordon, Marcus Clarke, and Rolf Boldrewood produced classic visions of colonial life and created a nascent national literature.

Melbourne's literary publishing sector is the largest in Australia, including the largest number of independent publishers, and presents two of Australia's most significant literary awards: the Victorian Premier's Literary Awards and the Melbourne Prize for Literature. Melbourne is the setting of many significant novels including Fergus Hume's The Mystery of a Hansom Cab (1886), George Johnston's My Brother Jack (1964), Helen Garner's Monkey Grip (1977) and Christos Tsiolkas’ The Slap (2008). The Mystery of a Hanson Cab was the best-selling detective novel of the 19th century. Garner's seminal 1977 novel Monkey Grip achieved notability for capturing Melbourne's burgeoning counter-culture and Bohemia scene, as well as the lives of communal single-mothers, junkies and artists living in sharehouses in the inner city neighbourhoods of Fitzroy and Carlton. It is now considered one of Australia's earliest and most important contemporary novels, with the BBC selecting it as one of "100 stories that shaped the world" – the only Australian novel on the list. Other contemporary writers from Melbourne include Kerry Greenwood, Germaine Greer, Stephanie Alexander, Tony Birch and Barry Dickins.

The Melbourne Writers Festival was founded in 1986 and is an annual, two-week literary festival that hosts keynotes, panels and workshops by a wide range of local and international guests. Since beginning as a one-day zine fair in 2004, the Emerging Writers' Festival has expanded to ten days of events, workshops, and panel discussions that are focused on the development of writers. Annually across Melbourne there are many local writers’ festivals including the Bayside Literary Festival, Williamstown Literary Festival and Glen Eira Storytelling Festival. In addition to book readings by local authors, many of these events provide opportunities for local writers to develop their skills via workshops and short-story competitions.

In August 2008, Melbourne was the second city in the world to be recognised as a City of Literature by UNESCO—the Wheeler Centre for Books, Writing and Ideas is a literary and publishing centre founded as part of Melbourne's successful bid. As well as programming literary events, debates and awards, the Wheeler Centre hosts literary organisations such as the Melbourne Writers’ Festival, Emerging Writers’ Festival, SPUNC, Australian Poetry, Express Media, Writers Victoria and the Melbourne City of Literature Office.

=== Opera and theatre ===
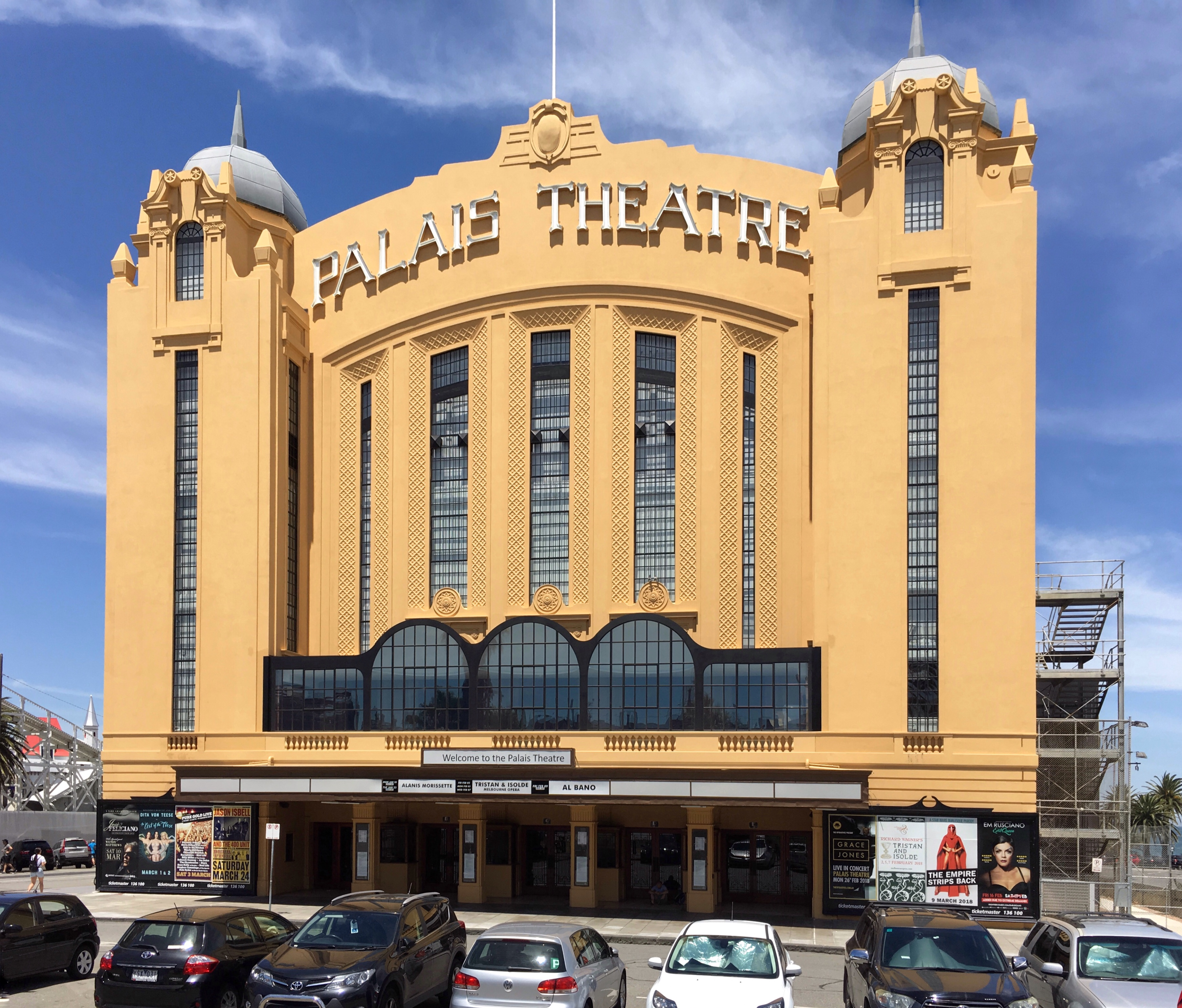
Palais Theatre in St Kilda.

The Australian Ballet Company is based in Melbourne and the National Theatre in St Kilda is the oldest ballet school in Australia. Ballet is a regular feature at the Victorian Arts Centre and National Theatre venues. Melbourne is the second home of Opera Australia after it merged with Victoria State Opera in 1996. The Victorian Opera held its inaugural season in 2006 and operates in various Melbourne venues.

The Royal Melbourne Philharmonic was formed in 1853, making it Australia's oldest musical organisation and the only orchestra in Australia to be bestowed "royal" status. The Victoria Orchestra, based in Melbourne, was Australia's first professional orchestra and performed during the period from 1888 to 1891. The Melbourne Symphony Orchestra, first assembled in 1906, is now the city's premier orchestra and tours internationally.

There are more theatres and performance venues in Melbourne than any other city in Australia. In Southbank, Victoria, the Arts Centre Melbourne is a hub of performing arts venues and is the cornerstone of the Melbourne Arts Precinct which also includes the Melbourne Recital Centre and Southbank Theatre, home of the Melbourne Theatre Company. In the city's East End Theatre District, notable theatres include the Princess Theatre, Regent Theatre, Forum Theatre, Comedy Theatre; the Athenaeum, and Her Majesty's Theatre. The Palais Theatre is a significant music venue in nearby St Kilda.

Several professional theatre companies operate in Melbourne, of which the Melbourne Theatre Company, the oldest professional theatre company in Australia, has the most institutional support of any in Australia. There is also a range of smaller professional theatre companies in Melbourne, including the Malthouse, La Mama in Carlton, Cariad Productions, the Red Stitch Actors Theatre, Theatreworks in StKilda and PONYCAM. An array of amateur companies also exist, such as OXAGEN Productions, the Malvern Theatre Company, CLOC, Catchment Players of Darebin, MLOC Productions, Theatrical Incorporated, Altona City Theatre, Windmill Theatre Company and Dandenong Theatre Company.

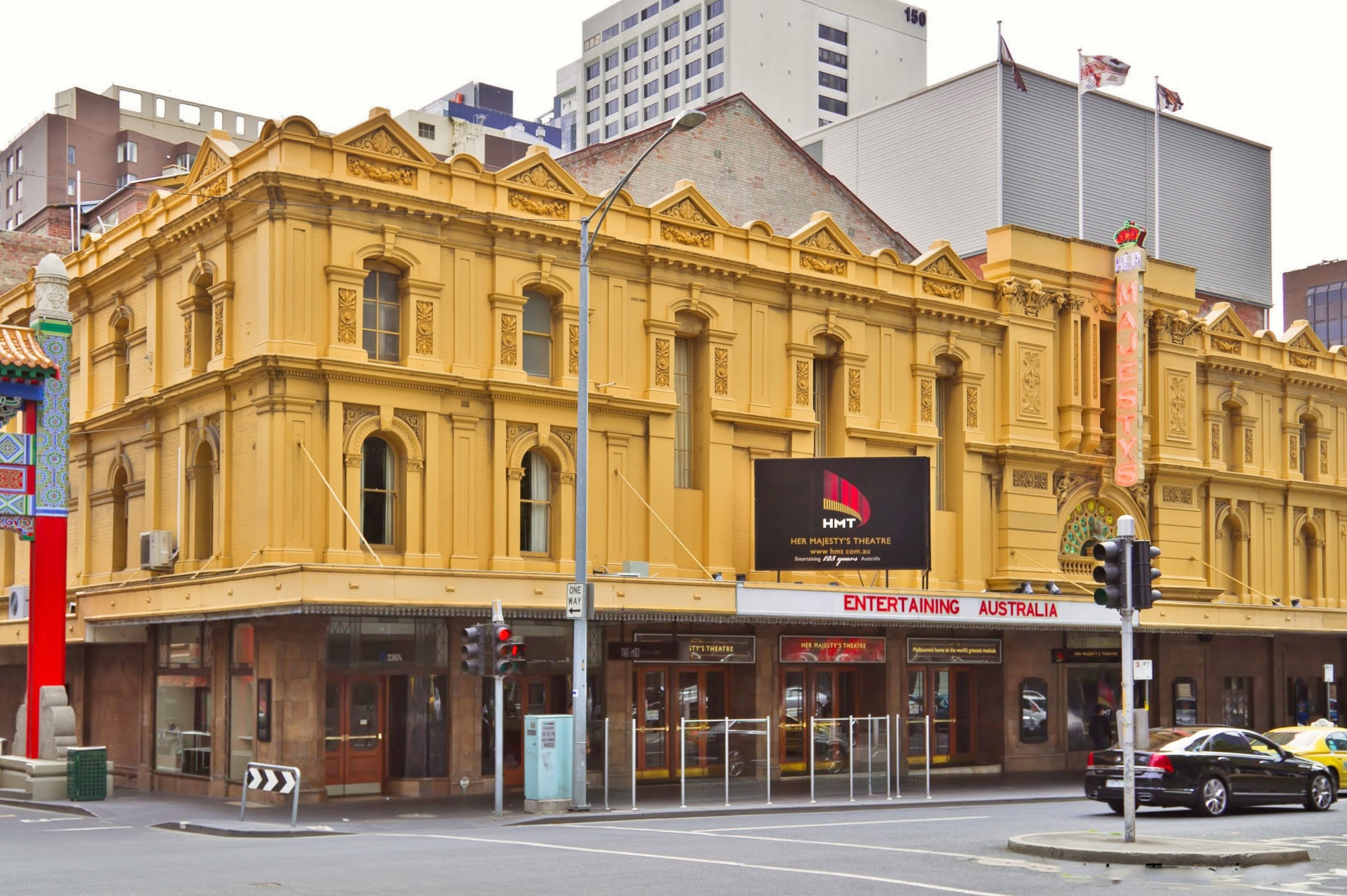
Her Majesty's Theatre

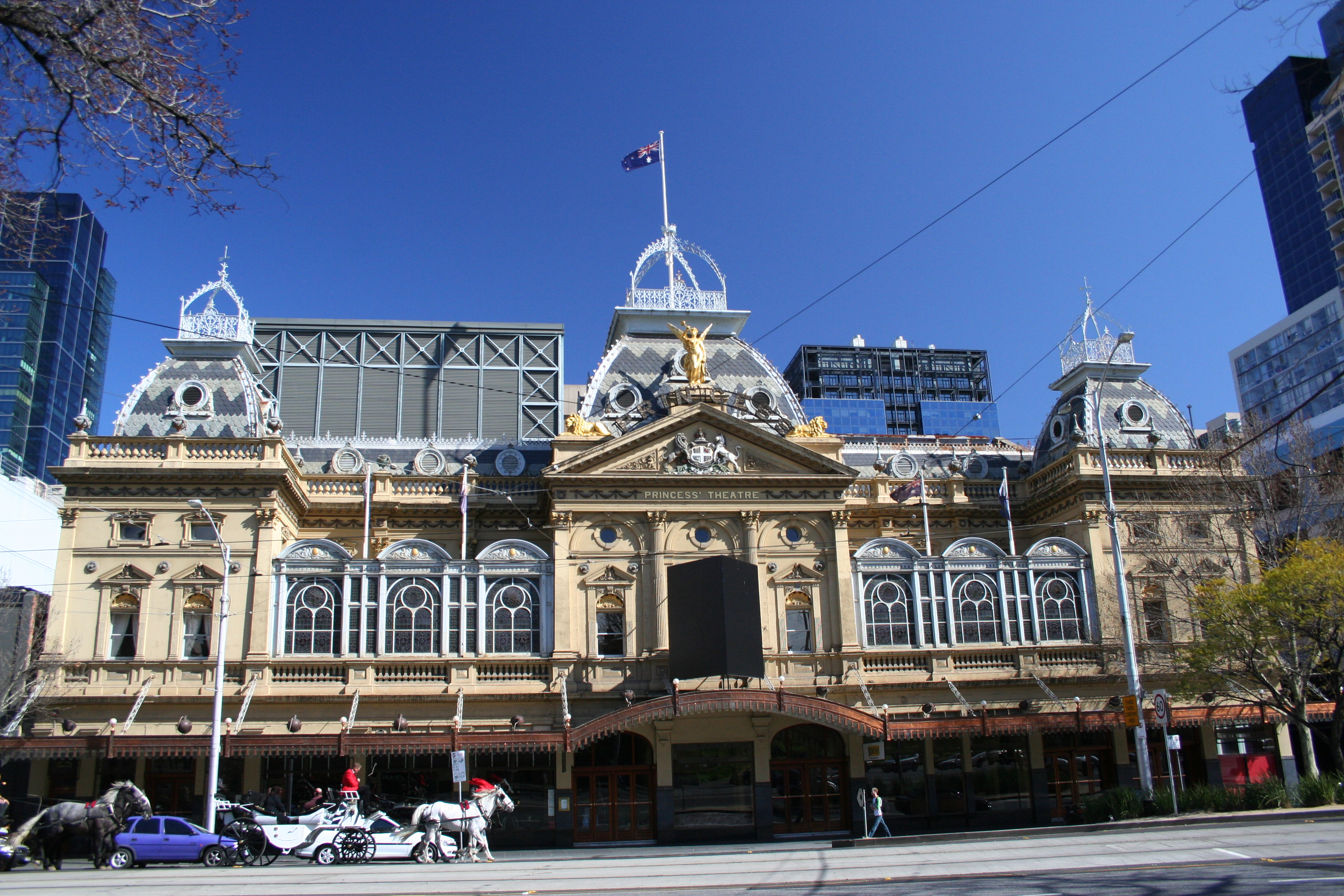
Princess Theatre

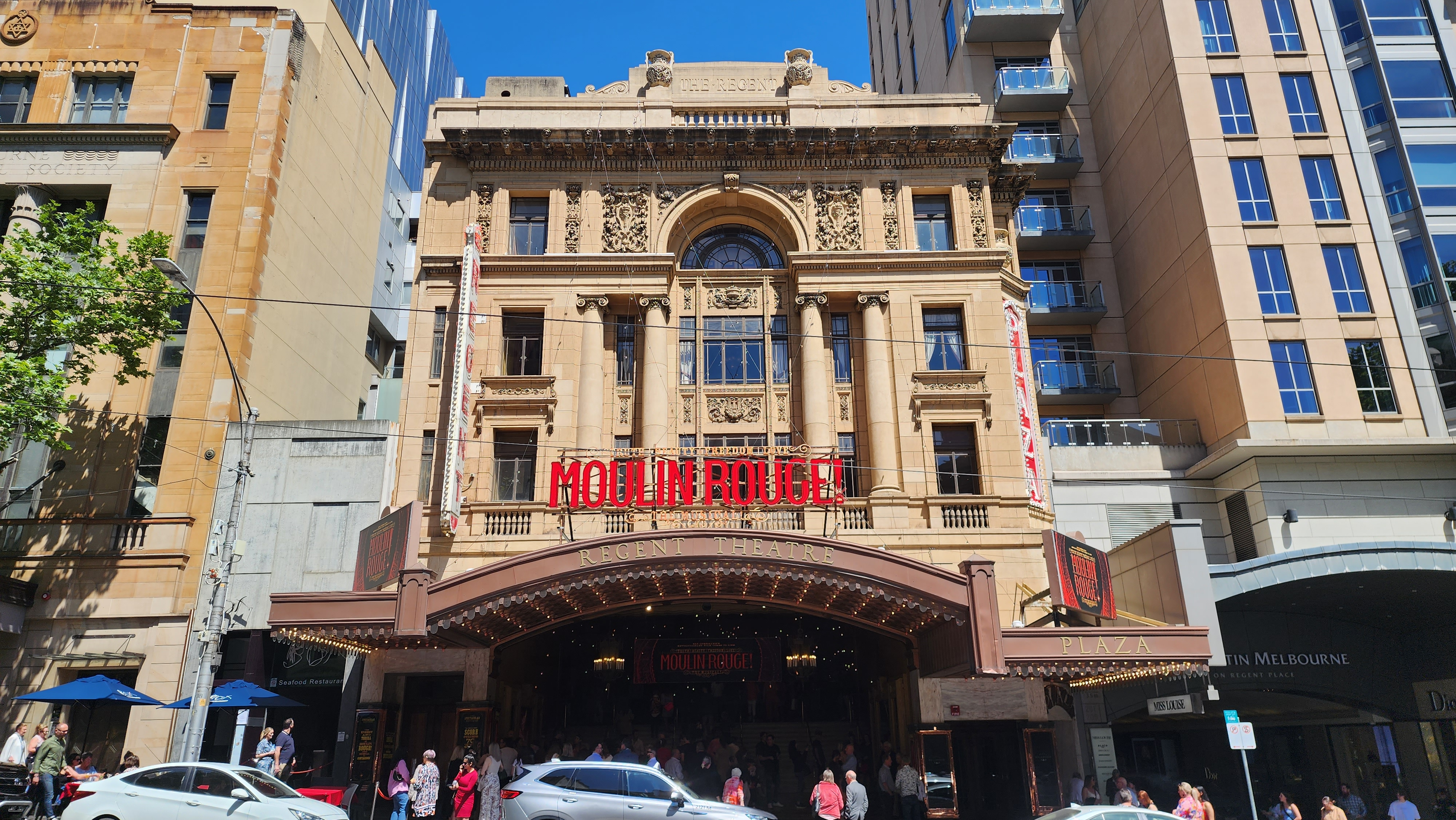
Regent Theatre

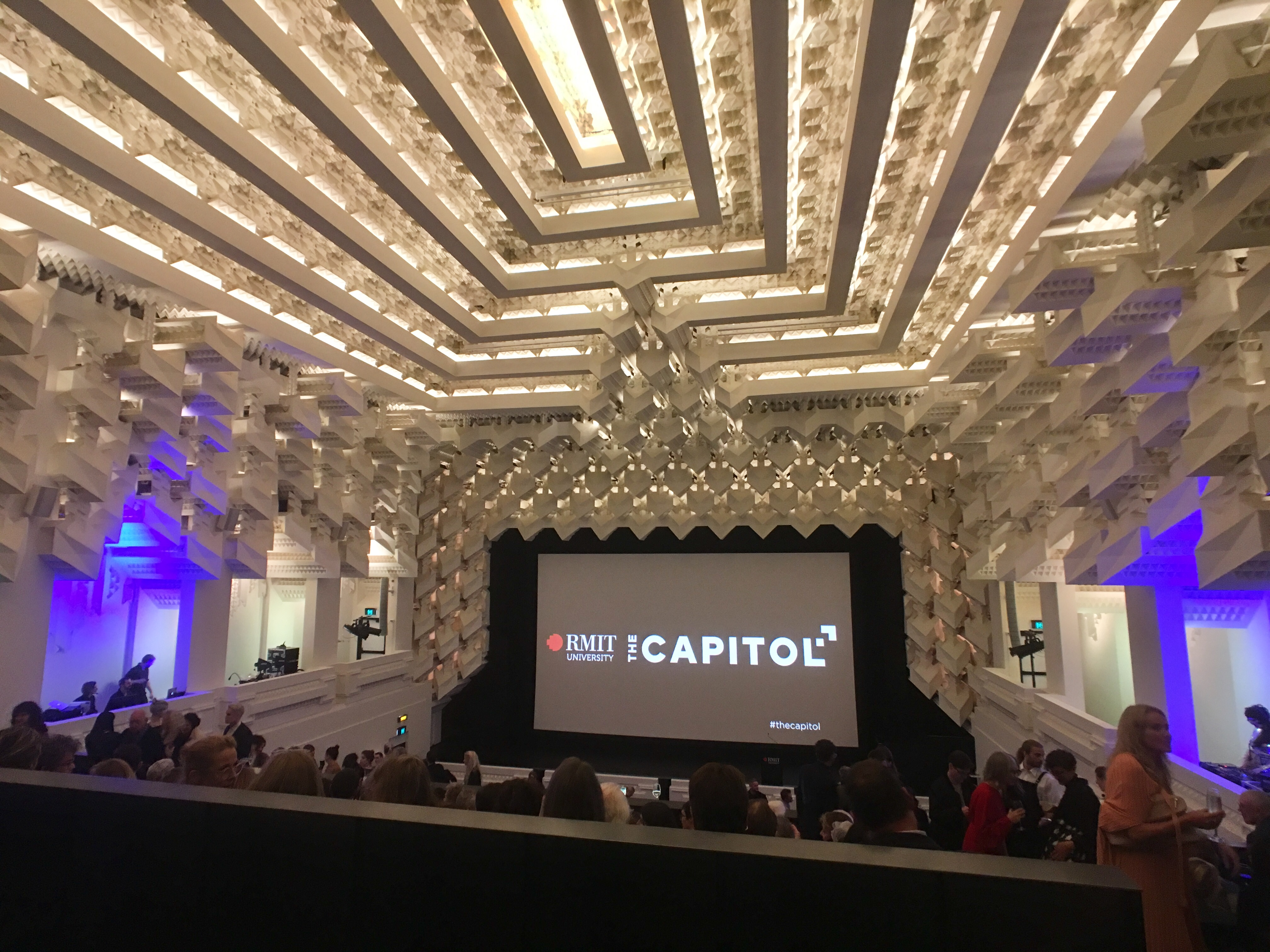
The Capitol

=== Comedy ===
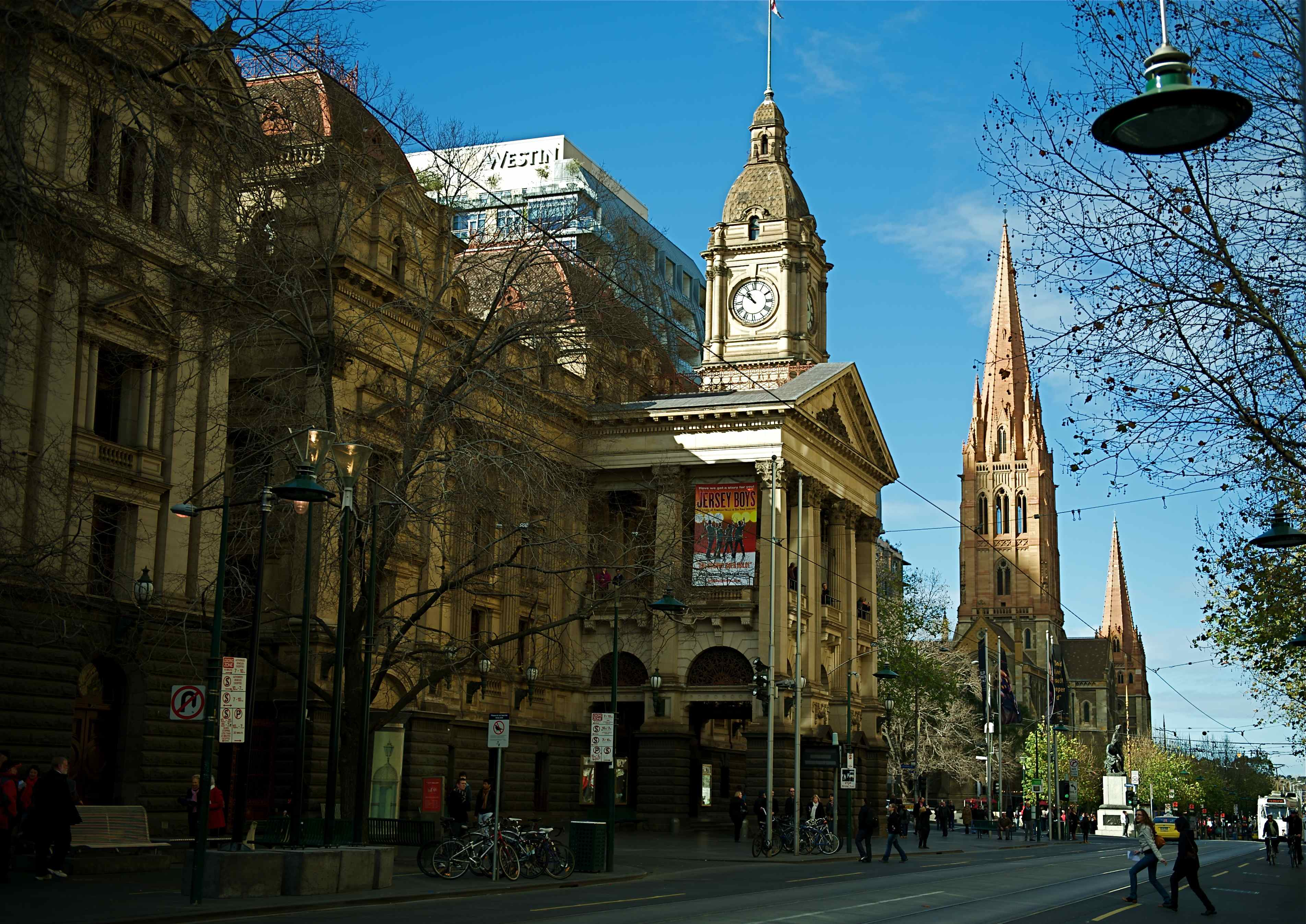
Melbourne Town Hall, one of the Melbourne International Comedy Festival's main venues

Melbourne is known throughout both Australia and the world as a centre of comedy, with the Melbourne International Comedy Festival listed as one of the three largest stand-up comedy festivals in the world. The city has also produced many of Australia's top-rating comedy television and radio shows, and many of the country's leading comedians either come from the city or have relocated to Melbourne.

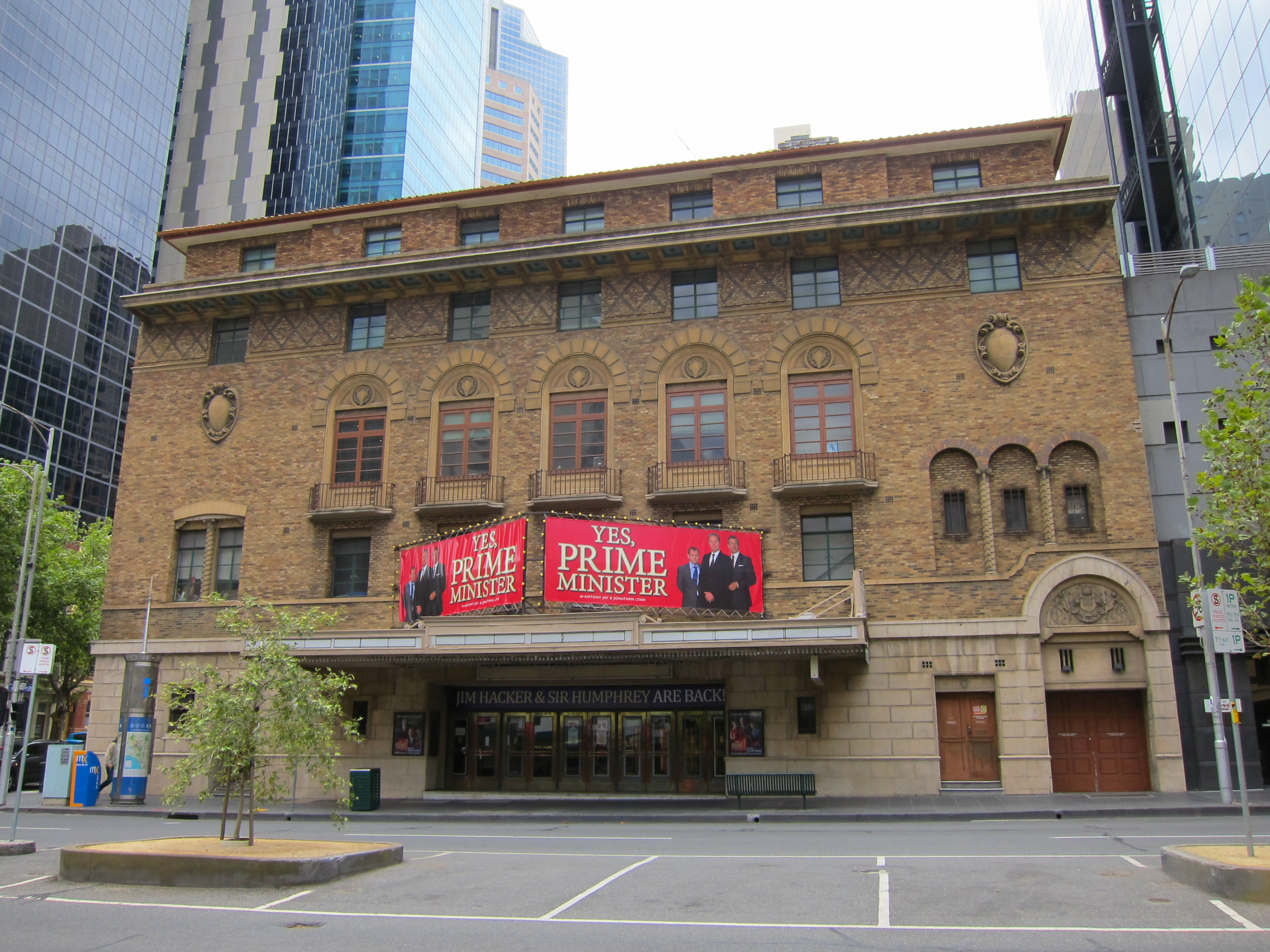
The Melbourne Comedy Theatre

Melbourne-born satirist Barry Humphries created his main character, Dame Edna Everage, as a comic version of a suburban homemaker. Through Everage, Humphries has written and performed cutting odes to Melbourne mores and the middle class suburbs of Moonee Ponds and Highett, among others. The character was retired in mid-2012 during the Eat Pray Laugh farewell tour.

=== Dance events ===
Melbourne also hosted the 2008 World Latin American Dance Championships. The competition was held in the Vodafone Arena and immediately following the Australian Dancesport Championships. The Australian Dancesport championships will commence on 10 December 2008 and the World Latin Championships will be held on 14 December 2008.

=== Visual arts ===
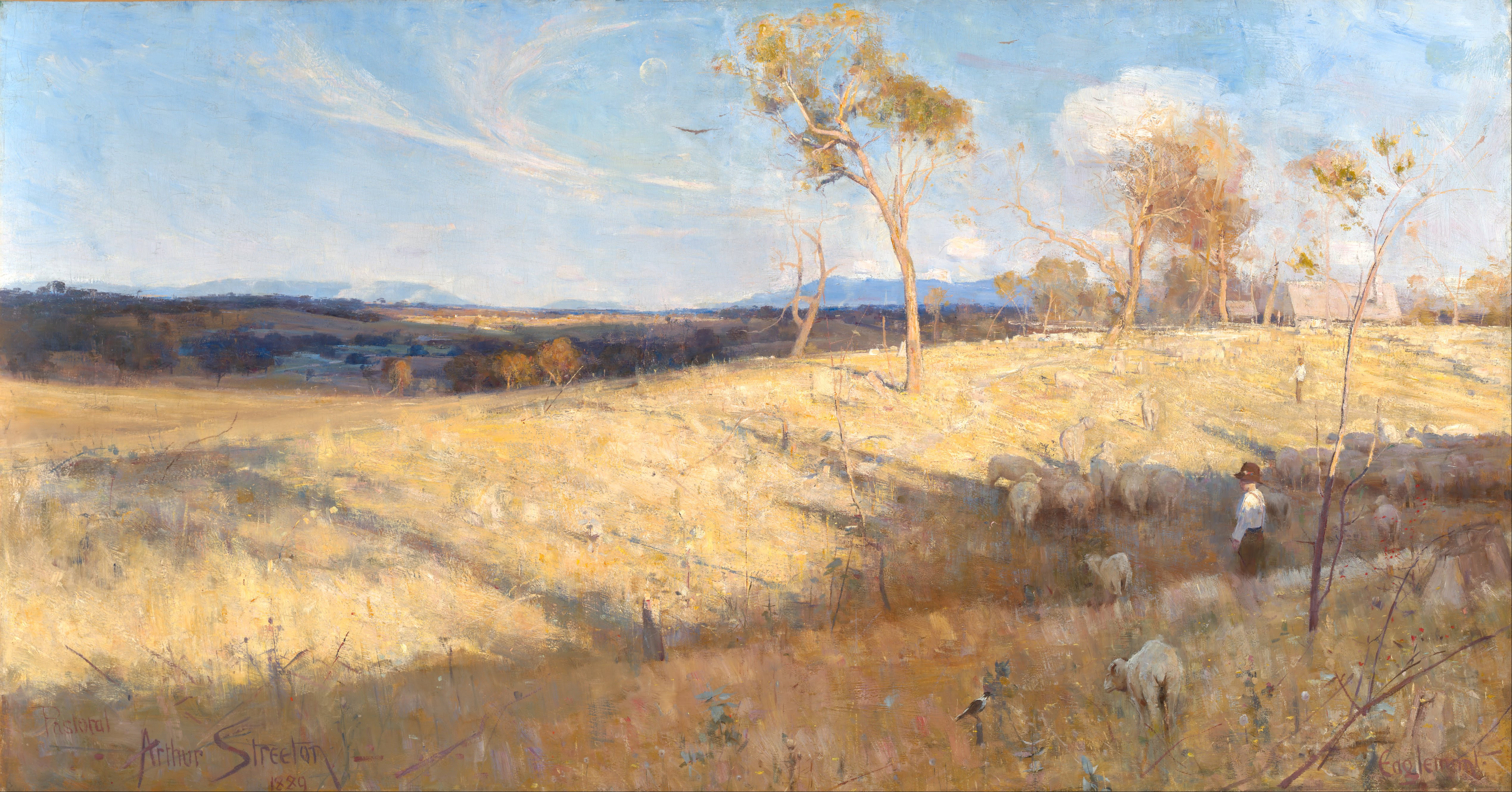
Golden Summer, Eaglemont (1889), painted by Heidelberg School artist Arthur Streeton in the then-rural Melbourne suburb of Heidelberg

The Melbourne arts scene is vibrant and the city hosts the annual Melbourne International Arts Festival as a celebration of its artistic tradition.

In the 1880s, a group of Melbourne artists formed the first distinctive Australian school of painting. Named the Heidelberg School, and latterly described as Australian Impressionism, the movement's four principle artists were Tom Roberts, Arthur Streeton, Charles Conder and Frederick McCubbin. Together they painted en plein air at artists' camps set up around Melbourne's rural suburbs, including Box Hill and Heidelberg, allowing them to capture the unique light, colour and atmosphere of the Australian bush. Many of the group's most famous works from this period are large-scale sunlit landscapes and pastoral figure subjects, however they also explored Melbourne's urban scenery, local history (including pioneer and bushranger themes), beaches (often along Port Phillip Bay at Mentone, Sandringham and Beaumaris), and did portraits of wealthy Melburnians from their inner-city studios. In 1889 they staged the 9 by 5 Impression Exhibition opposite the Melbourne Town Hall. It is regarded as a landmark event in Australian art history.

Modernist John Brack captured the idiosyncrasies of daily life in Melbourne. His most iconic painting, Collins Street., 5 pm (1955), shows grim-faced pedestrians moving in unison down Collins Street. It was voted by patrons in 2011 as the National Gallery of Victoria's most popular work.

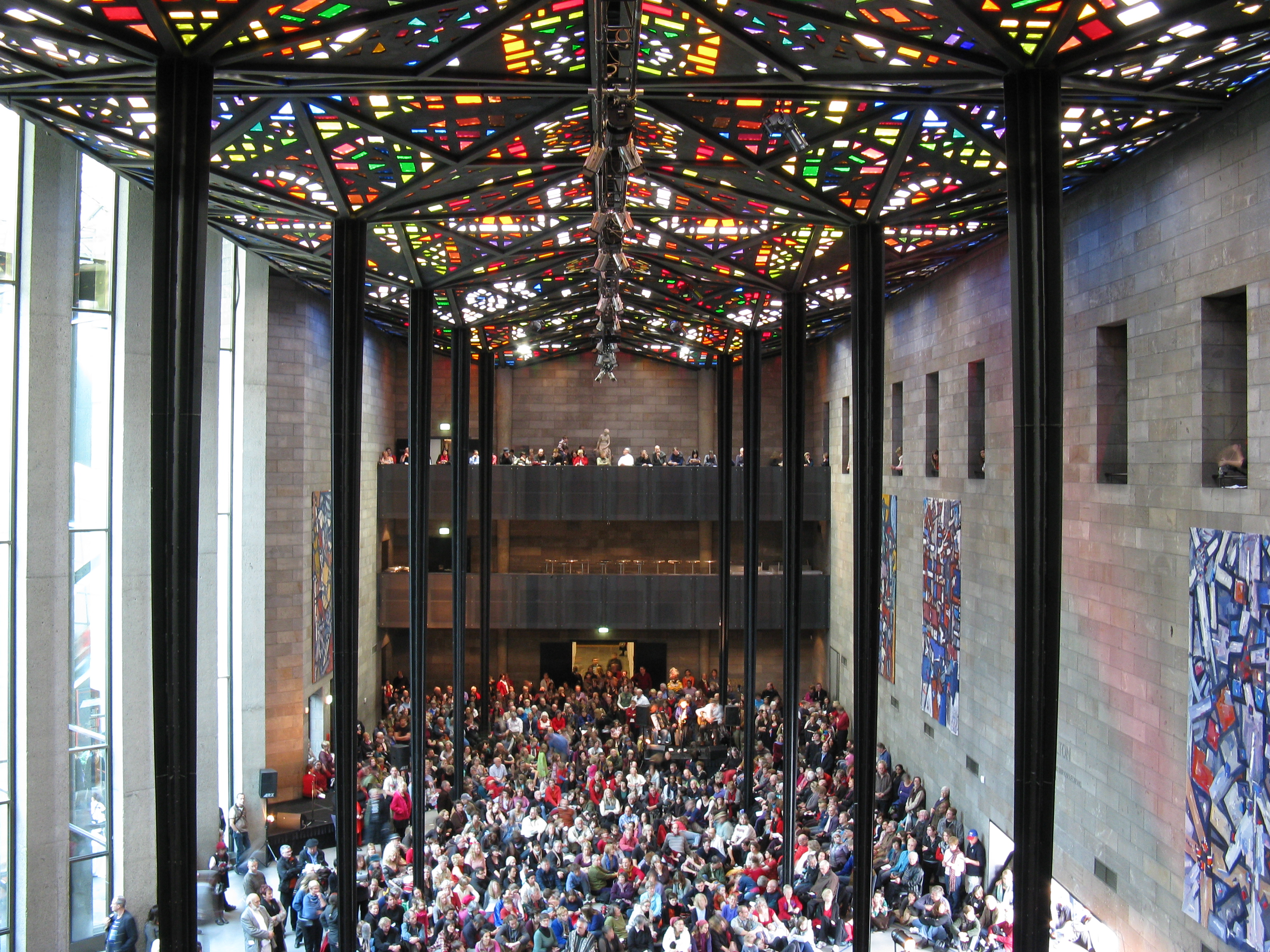
Leonard French's stained glass ceiling in the Great Hall of the National Gallery of Victoria

There are more than 100 galleries in Melbourne. In the city, NGV International, the Ian Potter Centre and Ian Potter Museum of Art, the Australian Centre for Contemporary Art, Flinders Lane Gallery, Anna Schwartz Gallery, McCulloch Gallery, and the Australian Centre for the Moving Image — an organisation dedicated to the moving image in all its forms, from film and animation, to video games and television — have been established. The Gertrude Contemporary Art Spaces and the Centre for Contemporary Photography, both based in Fitzroy, are examples of galleries in the inner-city. Suburban venues also exist, such as Heidelberg's Heide Museum of Modern Art, located in the north-eastern region of the city. The Art Almanac website, promoting itself as "Australia's Monthly Briefing on Art", publishes a monthly list of activities for Melbourne's galleries and art services, in addition to the other Australian states, covering more than 550 art galleries throughout the entire nation; the organisation also publishes a hard copy almanac each month.

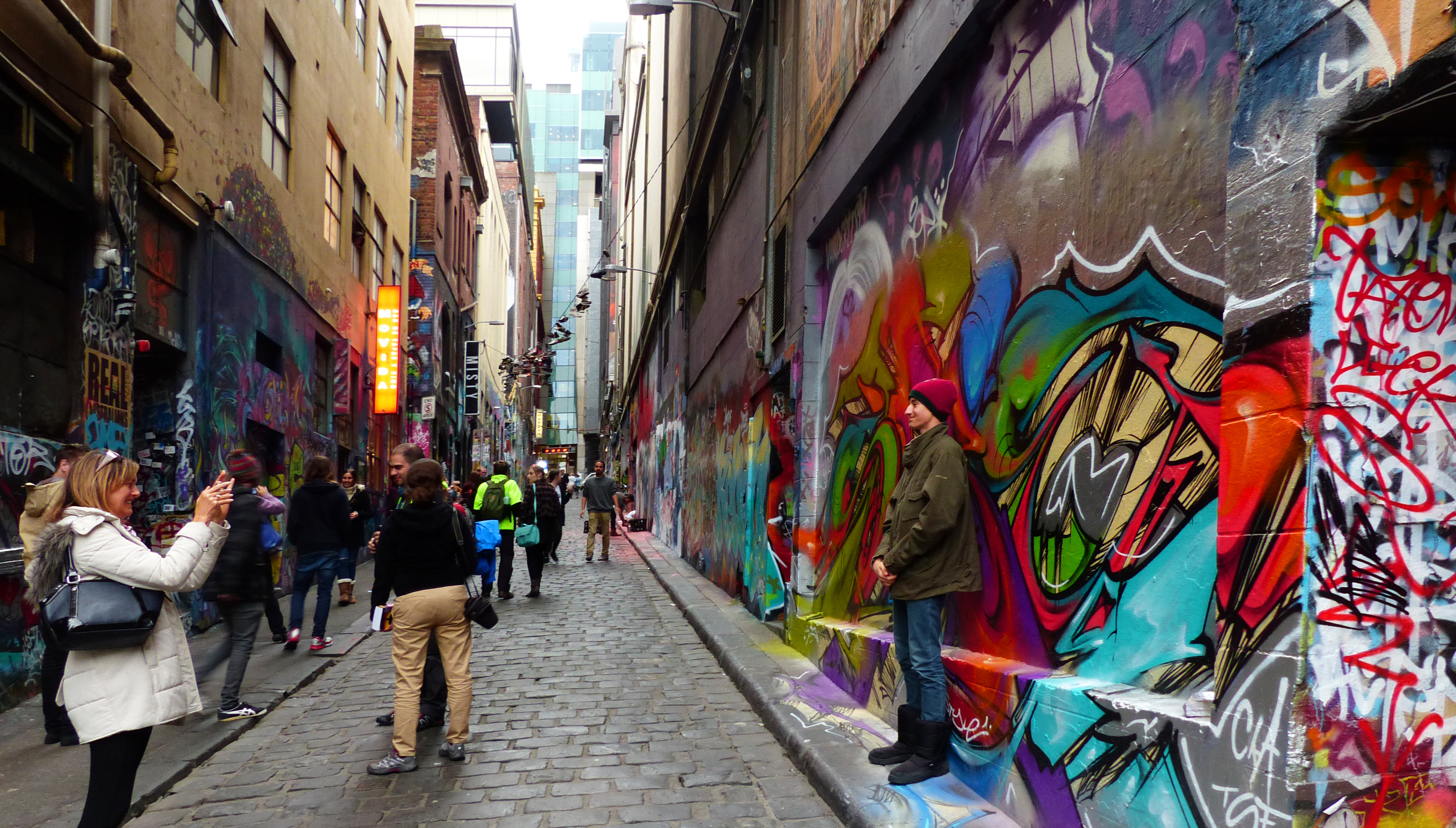
Street art in Hosier Lane

Melbourne is home to a large array of public artworks, statues and sculptures. Sculptors such as Deborah Halpern have played a large part in enhancing many of the city's public spaces with their iconic and larger-than-life works. In more modern times, the city has become well known for stencil graffiti, public art that appears in the city's numerous laneways.

The city has major film festivals including the Melbourne International Film Festival, Melbourne Queer Film Festival, Melbourne Underground Film Festival and Melbourne International Animation Festival, featuring several of the city's major cinemas. The Central City Studios in Melbourne Docklands, constructed in 2005, has seen the production of several big budget films.

Melbourne is also known for fashion. The city, once a leader in the textile industry, retains a small manufacturing base, but has diversified into the more creative areas of the fashion industry. The Melbourne Fashion Festival is one of the city's annual events, while the Melbourne Spring Racing Carnival, the Logies and the Brownlow Medal dinner are three of the biggest annual red carpet events in the country.

Street Art in Melbourne is internationally recognised. International artists, such as Banksy, have painted work in Melbourne.

=== Music ===
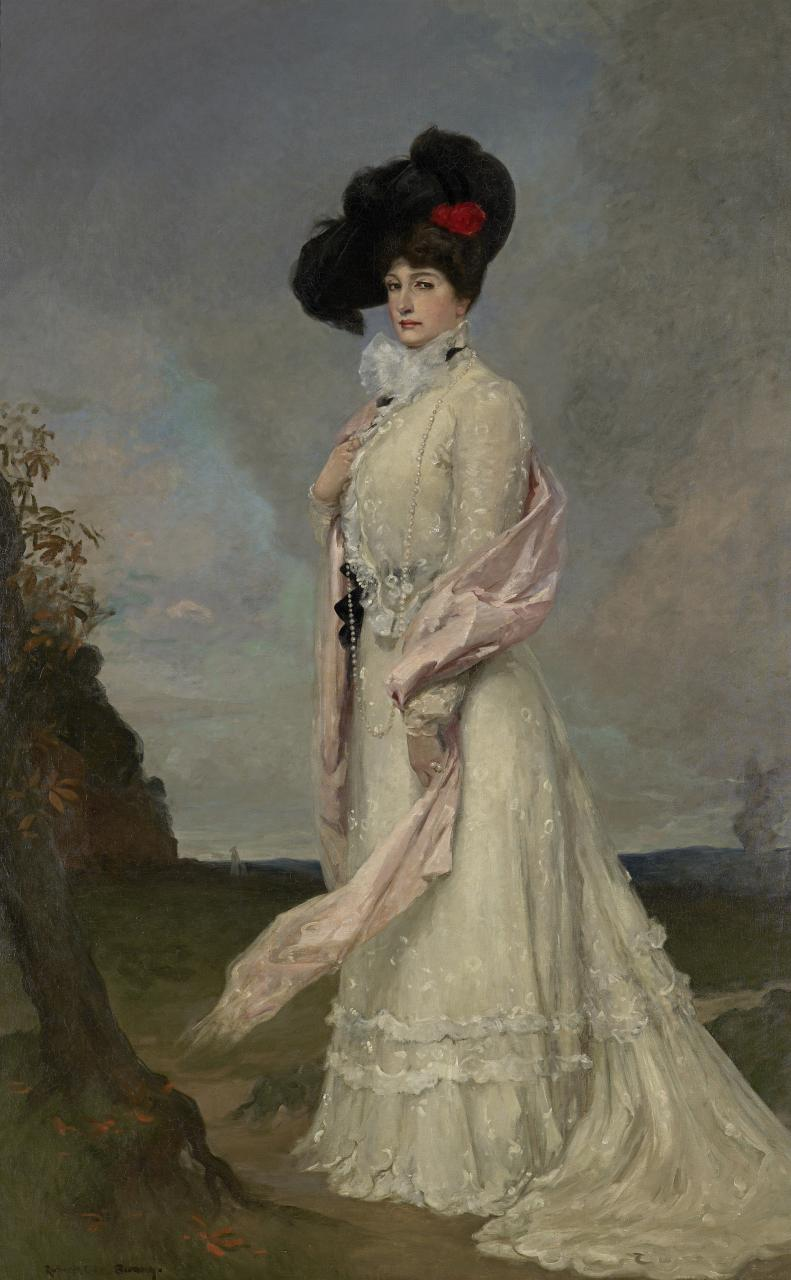
Nellie Melba, one of the Victorian era's most famous opera singers, took her stage name from her native Melbourne.

Melbourne has a large live music scene. In terms of the number of venues, it has been compared with cities such as Austin. Hundreds of venues throughout Melbourne host live music, some of which host live music every night of the week.

Operatic soprano Dame Nellie Melba, one of the late Victorian Era's most famous singers, took her stage name from her native Melbourne, her stage name also being the source of the term ‘melba toast’.

In 1934 Clement Williams recorded Let’s Take a Trip to Melbourne, written by Jack O'Hagan. Singer Paul Kelly has written several well-known songs about aspects of the city close to the heart of many Melburnians, notably "Leaps And Bounds" and "From St Kilda to King's Cross", while Skyhooks also wrote some more tongue-in-cheek songs about Melbourne. "Balwyn Calling", "Carlton (Lygon Street Limbo)" and "Toorak Cowboy" are examples. Melbourne-originated indie-rock band The Living End wrote the song "West End Riot" about differences between eastern and western suburbs in Melbourne's inner city.

The 1960s gave rise to many performers including Olivia Newton-John, John Farnham, Graeme Bell, and folk group The Seekers. The 1970s and 1980s saw many acts getting their first big breaks on Melbourne's Countdown, including the Little River Band and Crowded House who later wrote a song about the city of Melbourne called Four Seasons In One Day. Successful Melbourne artists include Flea (of the Red Hot Chili Peppers), Weddings Parties Anything, TISM, Snog, Jet and Something for Kate. Melbourne is also the home of rock "guru" journalist Ian "Molly" Meldrum.

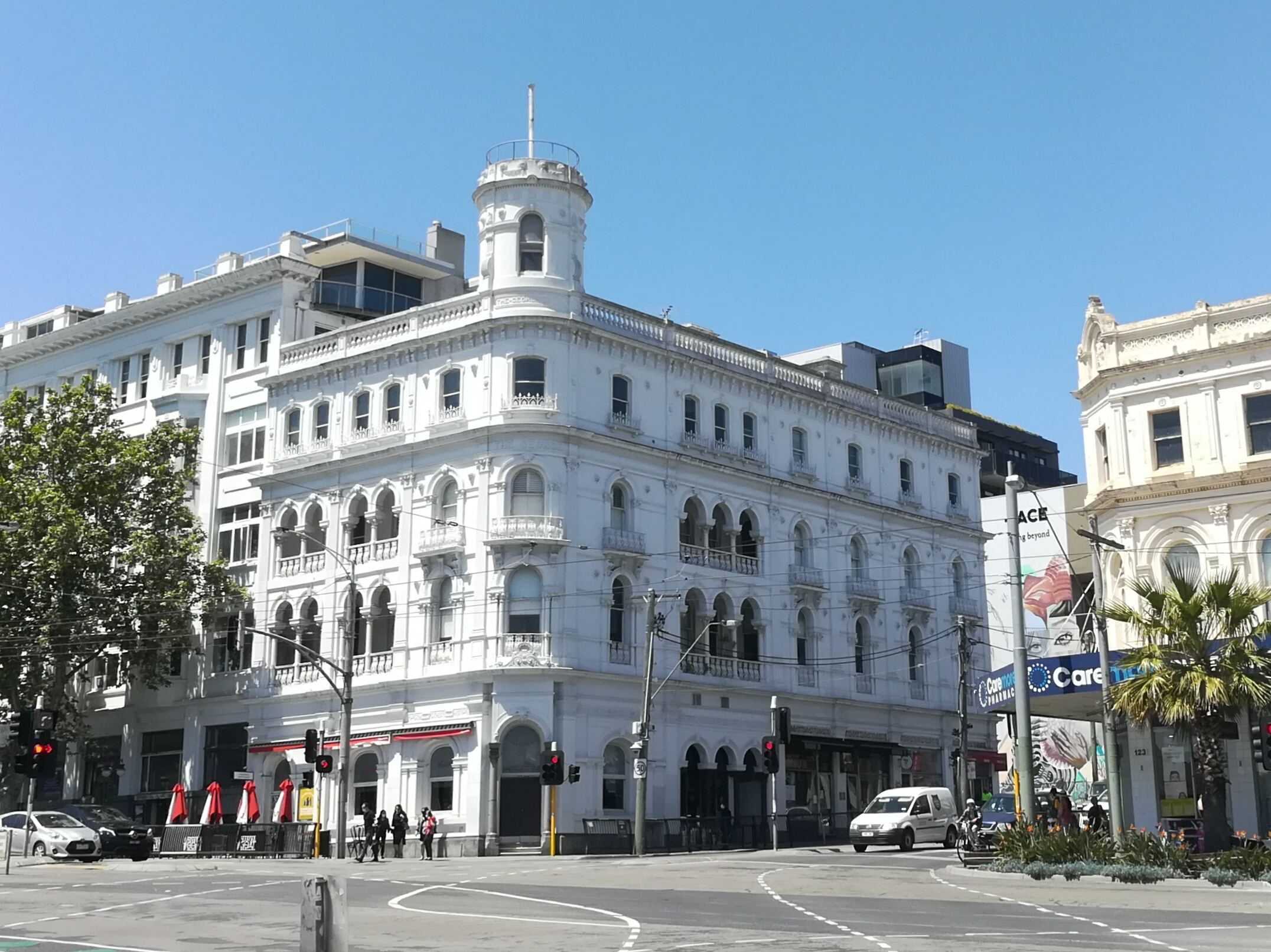
St Kilda's Crystal Ballroom, a famed venue for Melbourne punk and post-punk bands in the 1970s and 1980s

Melbourne's independent music scene flourished in the 1970s and 1980s with strong support from local venues, street press, community radio stations, and numerous record labels. Several distinct post-punk scenes emerged in the inner suburbs, each sharing a DIY ethic and a passion for experimentation. Led by the Primitive Calculators, the Fitzroy-based Little Band scene gave rise to groups such as Dead Can Dance and Hunters & Collectors. At The Organ Factory in Clifton Hill, conceptual composers mixed with experimental punk outfits, namely Tsk Tsk Tsk and Essendon Airport, out of which grew the funk-tinged pop group I'm Talking, fronted by a young Kate Ceberano. St Kilda's Crystal Ballroom became the stomping ground for darker, noisier punk groups, including The Moodists, Crime and the City Solution, and Nick Cave's The Birthday Party. Cave and Birthday Party bandmate Mick Harvey went on to form one of Australia's most acclaimed rock bands, Nick Cave and the Bad Seeds, whose evolving multinational lineup has included Melbourne musicians JG Thirlwell (known for his project Foetus), Hugo Race, and Dirty Three violinist Warren Ellis.

Many independent artists from Melbourne have become internationally notable and regularly tour abroad, including: The Temper Trap, Cut Copy, Architecture in Helsinki, The Drones, Grinderman, Augie March, New Buffalo, The Cat Empire, Dirty Three, Muscles, The Lucksmiths, Ned Collette, The Crayon Fields, Love of Diagrams, Midnight Juggernauts, Gotye, Courtney Barnett, Alex Lahey, G Flip and The Avalanches amongst others.

Melbourne's lively rock and pop music scene has fostered many internationally renowned artists, including Rogue Traders, Taxiride, Missy Higgins, Madison Avenue, Anthony Callea and The Living End. Melbourne-based television shows Young Talent Time and Neighbours gave many singers a launching pad to international success. Local talents to come from these shows include Kylie Minogue, Dannii Minogue, Tina Arena, Jamie Redfern and Jason Donovan. Another Music TV show that began in Melbourne was Turn It Up! It was first shown on Melbourne's Channel 31 and then relayed via satellite and rebroadcast terrestrially to major TV networks in over 22 countries. The show had the second largest viewing audience around the world, beaten only by the audience of American Bandstand. In one episode, the show presented Melbourne's annual festival Moomba to a world audience.

Melbourne's metal scene has given rise to acts such as Disembowelment, Ne Obliviscaris, Be'lakor and Deströyer 666.

== Media ==
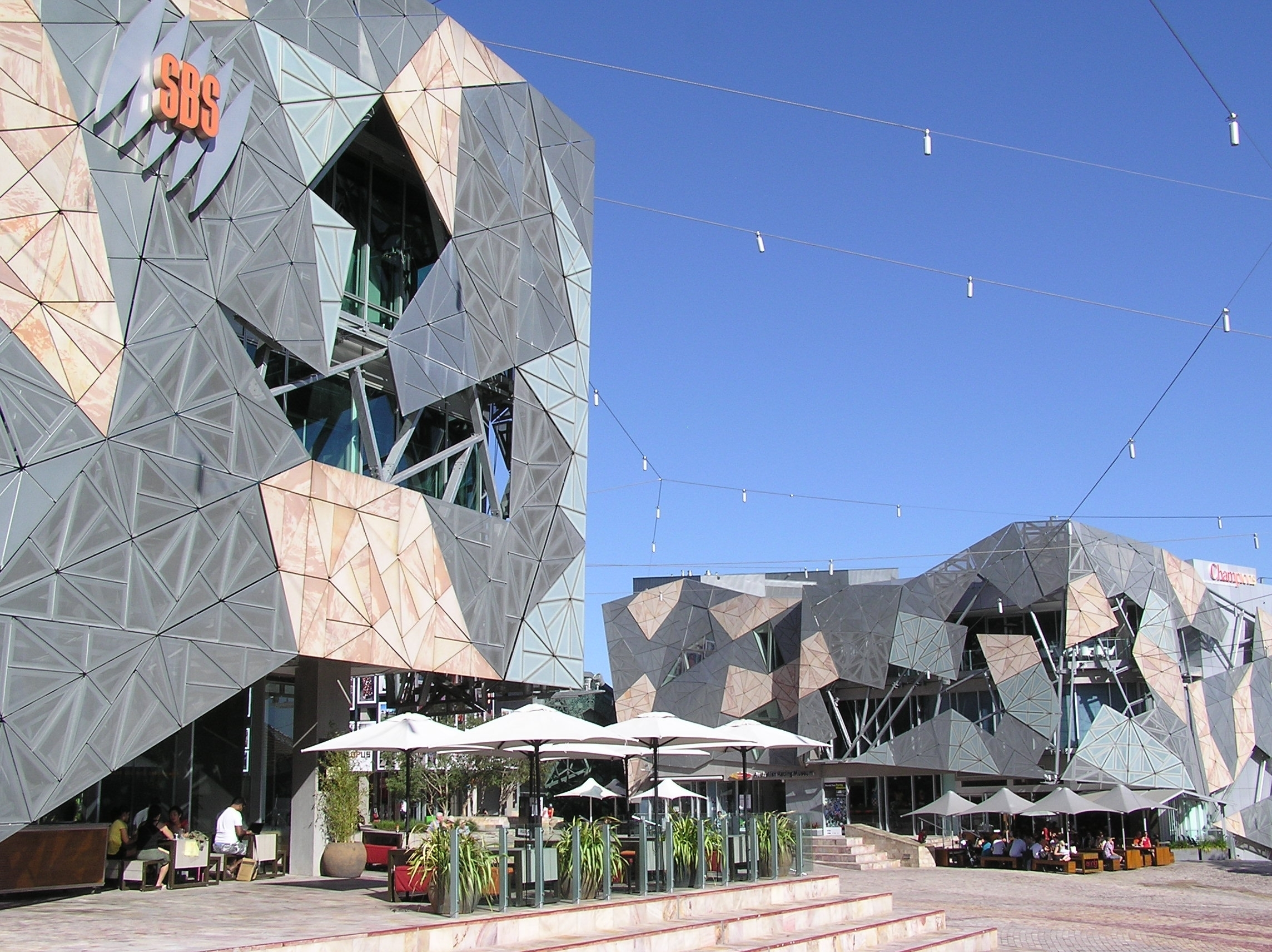
Melbourne Federation Square SBS building, the multi-culture television and radio networks

Melbourne has two major daily newspapers, News Corp Australia's Herald Sun and the Nine Entertainment owned The Age. A national Australian newspaper has a Victorian issue and is also published by News Corp. Several weekly magazines are published by News Corp. There are three commercial television networks: Seven, Nine and Ten; and three public: the ABC, SBS and a community television channel, C31. Leader Newspapers is Australia's largest publisher of community newspapers, distributing 33 local papers across Melbourne suburbs. More community newspapers are published by Fairfax Community Newspapers, and the Star News Group.

Melbourne's commercial radio industry is dominated by the Nova Entertainment and Southern Cross Austereo networks – all Melbourne-based. Nova stations include Nova 100 and Classic Rock, Southern Cross Austereo stations include Fox FM and Triple M. 3AW is consistently the city's highest-rating commercial radio station. Melbourne also boasts a number of community radio stations, of which the best known are 3RRR, 3PBS, 3CR, SYN, and JOY, the first Australian full-time gay and lesbian radio station. Public broadcasters include the multilingual SBS, and the ABC's Radio National, NewsRadio, and ABC Radio Melbourne.

=== Film and drama ===
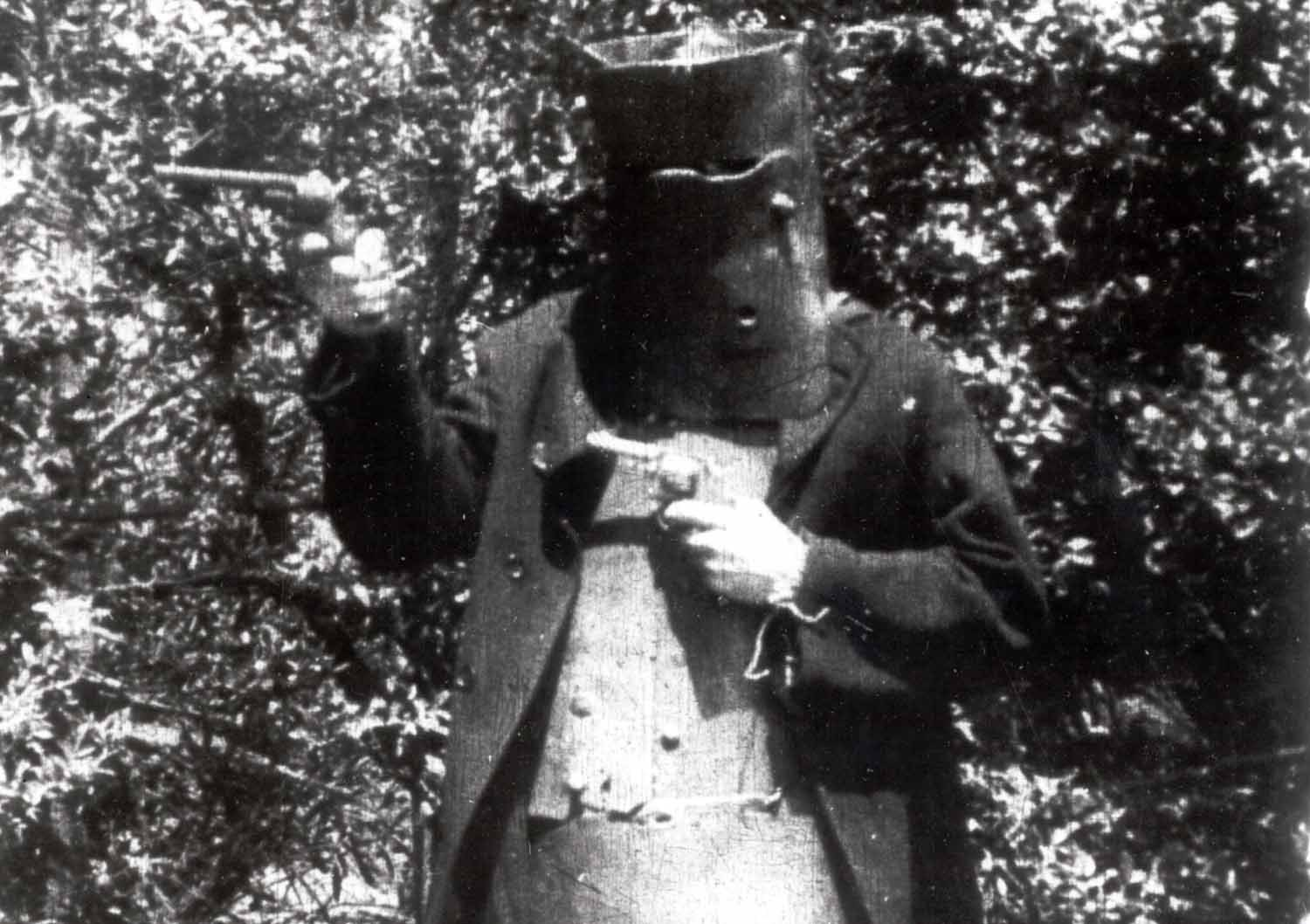
Actor playing Ned Kelly in the 1906 Melbourne production The Story of the Kelly Gang, the world's first dramatic feature-length film

Melbourne has been the setting for many novels, television dramas, and films. Fergus Hume's international best-seller Mystery of a Hansom Cab was set in Gold Rush era Melbourne. Frank Hardy's Power Without Glory tells the story of Melbourne businessman John West (based on the real-life John Wren) and is set in a thinly disguised Collingwood, then a working-class suburb of Melbourne. Perhaps the best-known novel internationally is Nevil Shute's novel On the Beach. In 1959, it was made into a film directed by Stanley Kramer and starring Gregory Peck, Ava Gardner and Anthony Perkins. The film depicted the denizens of Melbourne quietly slipping off into eternity as the last victims of a global nuclear holocaust. It was filmed on location in and around Melbourne. Similar filming was undertaken when a 2000 television movie remake was produced.

The world's first feature film, The Story of the Kelly Gang, was filmed in Melbourne in 1906. Some of the more famous Australian films include Mad Max and The Castle. Melbourne has also produced many talented film and television actors including Cate Blanchett, Guy Pearce, Eric Bana and is home to Geoffrey Rush.

Australian audiences saw Melbourne portrayed in the 1960s–70s Crawford Productions police television drama series Homicide and Division 4. Contemporary series include: soap opera Neighbours, Stingers (an undercover police drama), The Secret Life of Us, Kath & Kim, Prisoner (known as Prisoner: Cell Block H for US and UK broadcasts), Halifax f.p., and MDA. Melbourne was also used to represent and double as New England and Boston in the 2009 film Knowing, an American production shot in Australia. The 2014 film Predestination was shot in Melbourne, though the story takes place in New York City. In 2022, the documentary The Lost City of Melbourne screened at the Melbourne International Film Festival. The documentary details Melbourne's rich architectural history, particularly during its Marvellous Melbourne era when it was said to be the wealthiest city in the British Empire. In an article about the documentary for The New York Times, Natasha Frost commented:

"Melbourne has little such on-screen cachet. Its skyline barely sticks in the memory. Instead, those architectural aspects that linger are on a far smaller scale: the lacy ironwork that fringes cottages and terrace houses; the unusually broad streets of the central city; the independent cinemas spread across town–the Astor, the Palace, the Sun Theatre–with their gran facades and gently creaking seats."
– Natasha Frost, The New York Times

== Sport ==
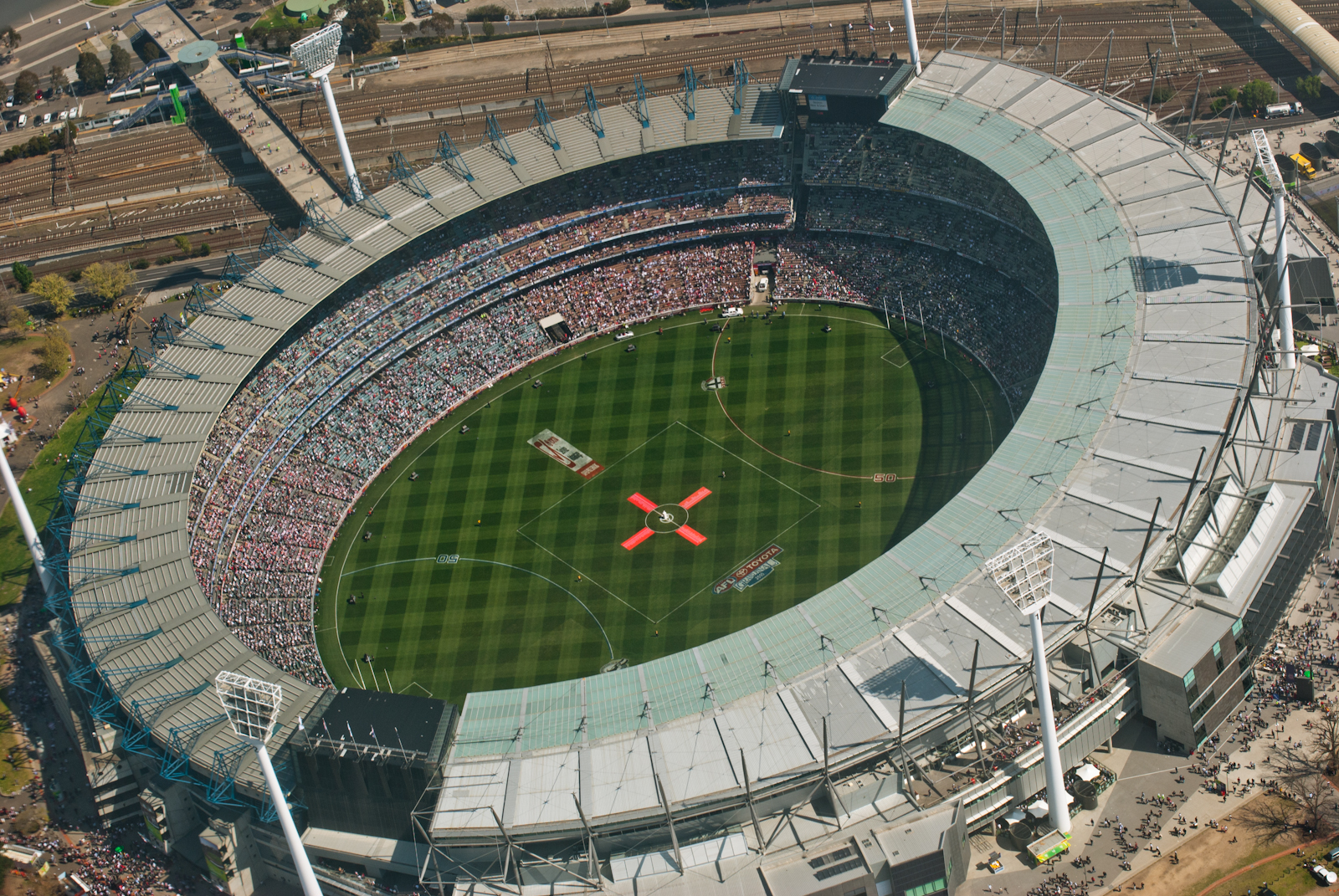
The Melbourne Cricket Ground during the 2010 AFL Grand Final.

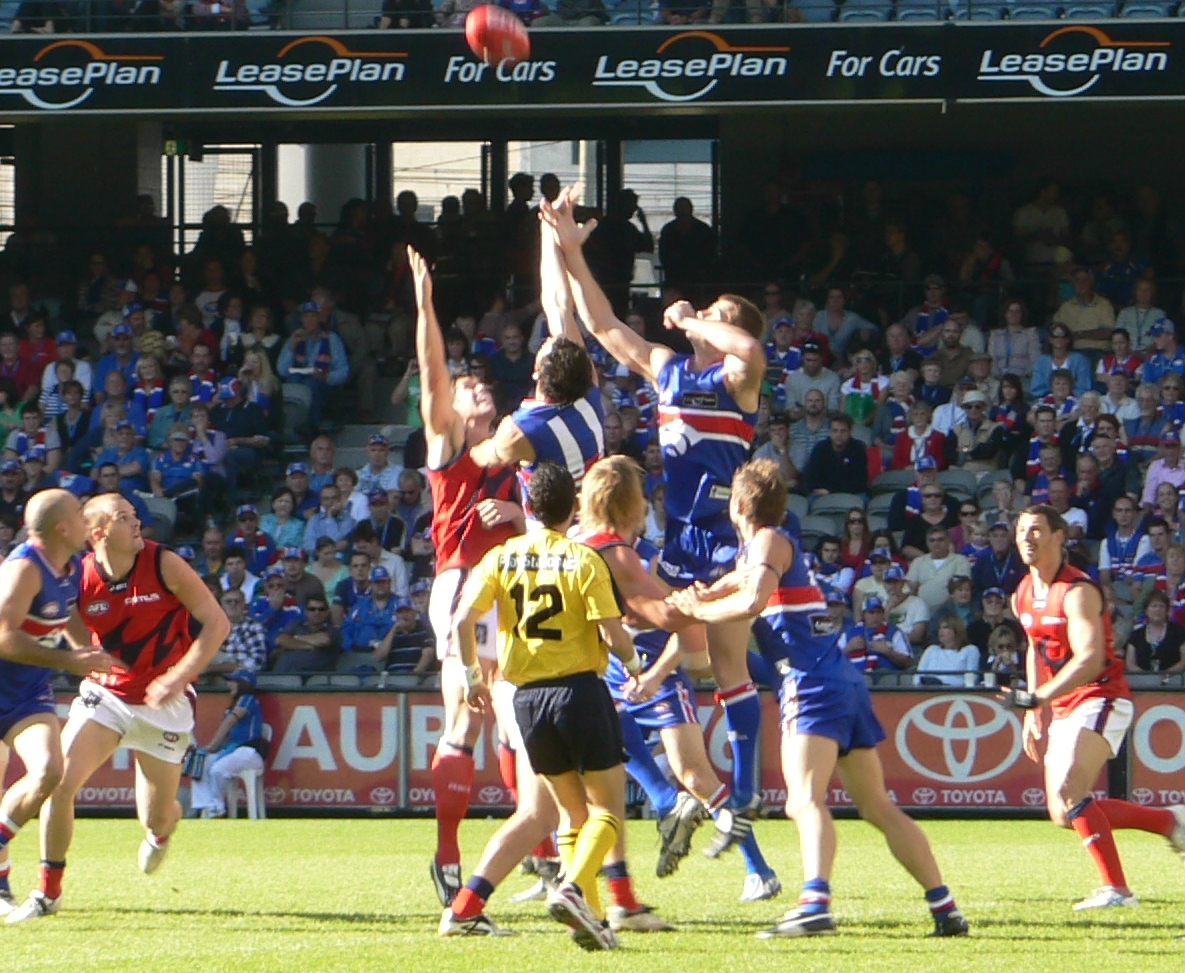
Australian rules football, Melbourne's most popular homegrown sport, at Docklands Stadium

In a country that is often labelled 'sports mad', Melbourne has a reputation among Australians for being the national sporting capital. In 2010, the city was named "World's Ultimate Sports City" for the third time in a row by SportAccord and SportBusiness. Criteria for the award include "the number of annual sports events held, major events held or hosting rights secured between 2006 and 2014, numbers of federations hosted, facilities/venues, transport, accommodation, government support, security, legacy, public sports interest and quality of life." A similar study conducted in 2006 by the London-based research and consulting firm ArkSports found Melbourne to be the world's top city for sports events.

The city hosts many major sporting events including the Melbourne Spring Racing Carnival (featuring "the race that stops the nation", the Melbourne Cup); the Australian Formula One Grand Prix; the Australian round of the MotoGP; the Australian Open tennis tournament, the first of the four annual Grand Slam events; the AFL Grand Final and the Boxing Day Test Match. In 1956, Melbourne became the first city in the Southern Hemisphere to host the Olympic Games, and played host to the 2006 Commonwealth Games.

Melbourne is where Australian rules football originated in the 1850s—the world's first codified game of football and the most popular sport in Australia by attendance and viewership. The city is home to nine of the eighteen teams that constitute the Australian Football League (AFL), whose five Melbourne games per week attract an average of 40,000 people per game. The AFL Grand Final, one of the biggest sporting events in Australia, is played on the last Saturday of September at the sport's "spiritual home", the 100,000 capacity Melbourne Cricket Ground (MCG). Another significant Melbourne-based event on the AFL calendar is the Anzac Day clash between rival clubs Collingwood and Essendon. The city is also home to nine out of thirteen teams competing in the semi-professional Victorian Football League. Since 1999, the city has been the biennial host of the International Rules series involving the Australian national team and the Irish national team. The Australian Football International Cup is staged every three years in Melbourne.

During the summer months cricket takes preference amongst Melburnians. In 1877, the world's first Test cricket match was contested by Australia and England at the Melbourne Cricket Ground, and The Ashes urn—symbol of the cricket rivalry between Australia and England—originated in Melbourne. The annual Boxing Day Test, also held at the MCG, is a prominent feature of the Melbourne summer, attracting the largest attendance of any Test match in the world. The Melbourne-based Victorian Bushrangers represent the state of Victoria in the Sheffield Shield and One-Day Cup. The Melbourne Stars and Melbourne Renegades compete in the Twenty20 Big Bash League.

Melbourne has three A-League (association football) teams: Melbourne Victory, Melbourne City, and Western United. In rugby there is Melbourne Storm (NRL), and Melbourne Rebels (Super Rugby). Melbourne United and South East Melbourne Phoenix compete in the NBL (basketball). For netball, two Melbourne teams compete in the Suncorp Super Netball: Melbourne Vixens and Collingwood Magpies Netball.

Bledisloe Cup Test matches between the Australian and New Zealand national rugby union teams were staged at the MCG in 1997 and 2007. Melbourne also hosted 7 of 48 matches during the 2003 Rugby World Cup. One-off rugby league matches have been held at Etihad Stadium including the Rugby League State of Origin (most recently in 2012), and a 2006 Tri-Nations Test.

Melbourne is home to 29 stadiums with a capacity of over 10,000 people. Some venues, such as the Albert Park Circuit and Calder Park Raceway, have large capacities but only temporary structures, while there are numerous suburban horse racing tracks and Australian rules football playing fields. In 2000 construction was completed on the Docklands Stadium, capable of seating up to 56,000 people. The stadium was the first in the world to host cricket and Australian football matches under a roof.

The city also has large State Cycling, Hockey, Baseball/Softball and Netball centres, and an Ice centre (National Ice Sports Centre, hosting the Australian Olympic Winter Institute) is being constructed in Docklands.

Melbourne hosted the 2002 World Masters Games; broke new ground as the first city outside the United States to host the World Police and Fire Games in 1995, and the Presidents Cup golf tournament in 1999; and was the first city in the Southern Hemisphere to host the World Polo Championship in 2001. The city has hosted FIFA World Cup qualifiers in both 1997 and 2001.

The Rod Laver Arena was converted into a pool for the 2007 World Aquatics Championships.

Melbourne's skateboarding culture has a lengthy history, with brands such as Globe originating in the city. In 1988, the Australian 60 Minutes program produced a segment that focused solely on Victorian skateboarding. The segment featured Melbourne skateboarding and conducted interviews with notable figures such as the Hill brothers (Stephen, Matt and Mike) and Borgy. X-E-N is a Melbourne skateboard company that was established in 1999 and was co-founded by Andrew and Anthony Mapstone—two figures who, as of August 2012, remain influential in Australian skateboarding.

== Recreation and leisure ==
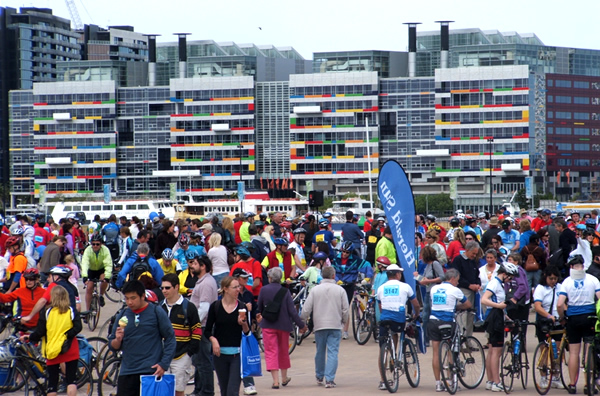
Around the Bay in a Day cycling event.

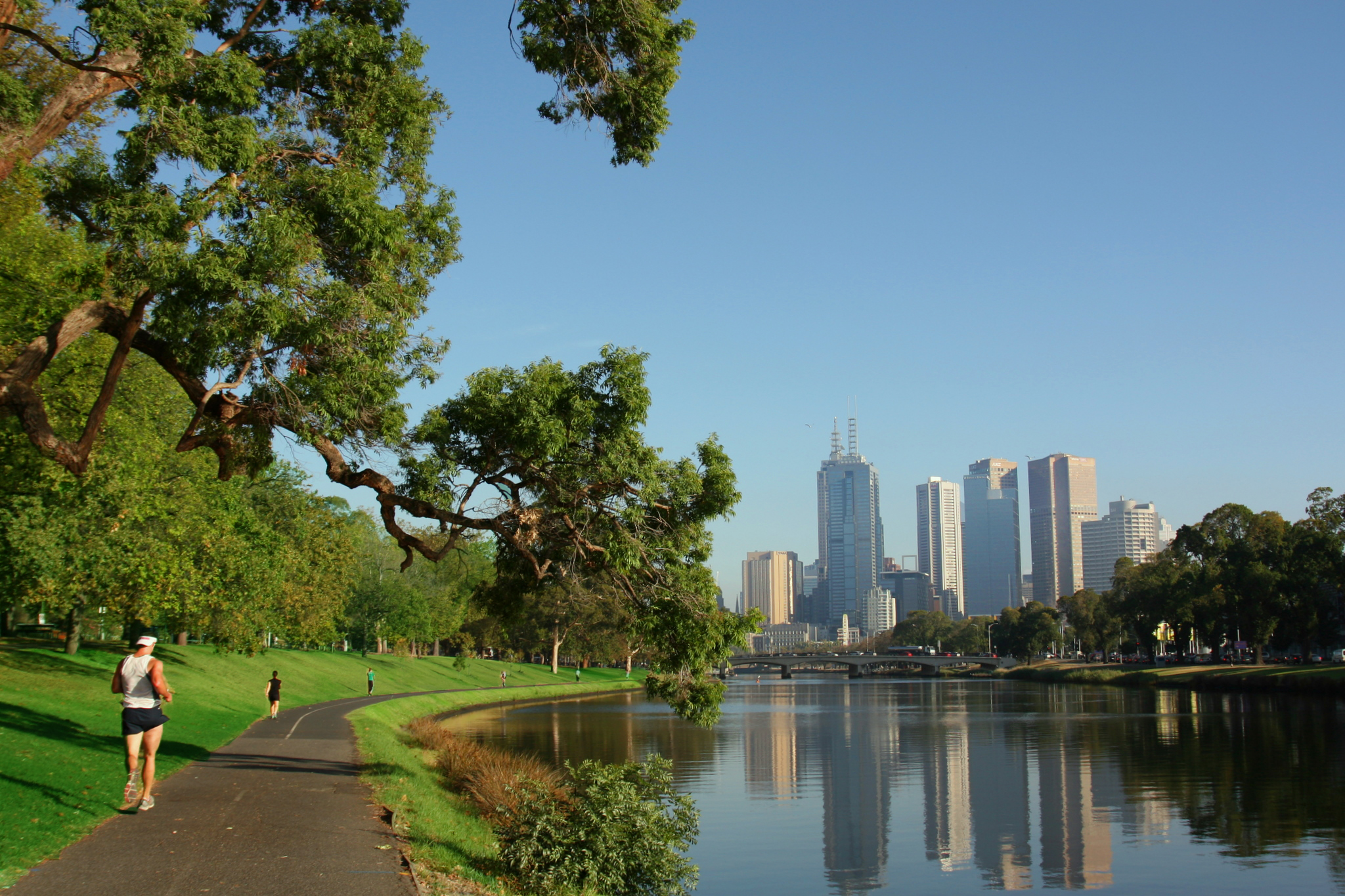
Yarra River walk paths

Melburnians participate in a wide range of recreational and leisure activities.

Australian rules football, Association Football, cricket and netball are popular participation team sports in Melbourne.

Cycling in Melbourne is a popular pastime, as well as a spectator sport. Melbourne's flat terrain and extensive off-road paths in green wedges are conducive to riding. Beach Road combines with the Nepean Highway to form a 90-kilometre stretch from Port Melbourne to Sorrento, incorporating the Bayside Trail. It is the city's most popular training route and attracts cyclists from around the world. Thousands of commuters cycle the roads, bike lanes and bike paths daily. Bicycle Victoria's annual events, Around the Bay in a Day and Ride to Work Day, attract tens of thousands of Melburnians. Other events such as the Herald Sun Tour begin and end in the Melbourne area and there are many local cycling events of varying grades all year round.

Triathlon dominates the Beach Road area during summer, when hundreds of amateurs and professionals dive into Port Phillip Bay on Sundays.

Watersports are a big recreational activity in Melbourne. Rowing on the Yarra River is also popular with universities and schools, and there are many boat-sheds along the river. the Yarra is home to the Head of the River, first raced in 1868 and Australia's oldest. The Oarsome Foursome are also from Melbourne. On Port Phillip Bay, boating is a pastime, as is jetskiing, kitesurfing and windsurfing on St Kilda Beach.

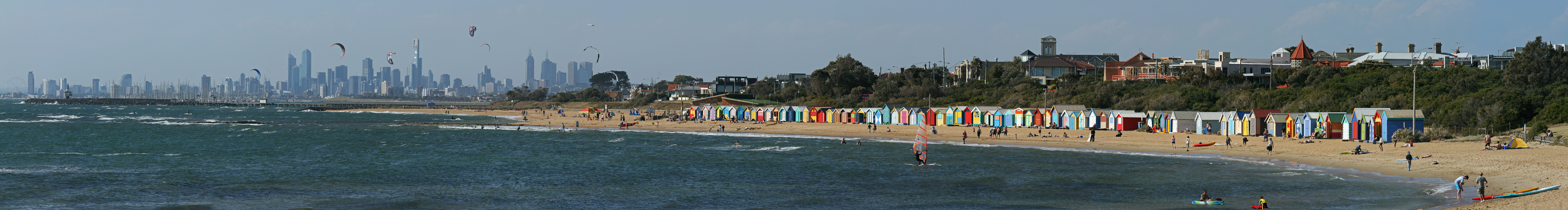
Port Phillip's many beaches are home to a wide range of recreational activities. (Pictured: Brighton's famous colourful bathing boxes, kitesurfers and the city skyline).

== Parks and gardens ==
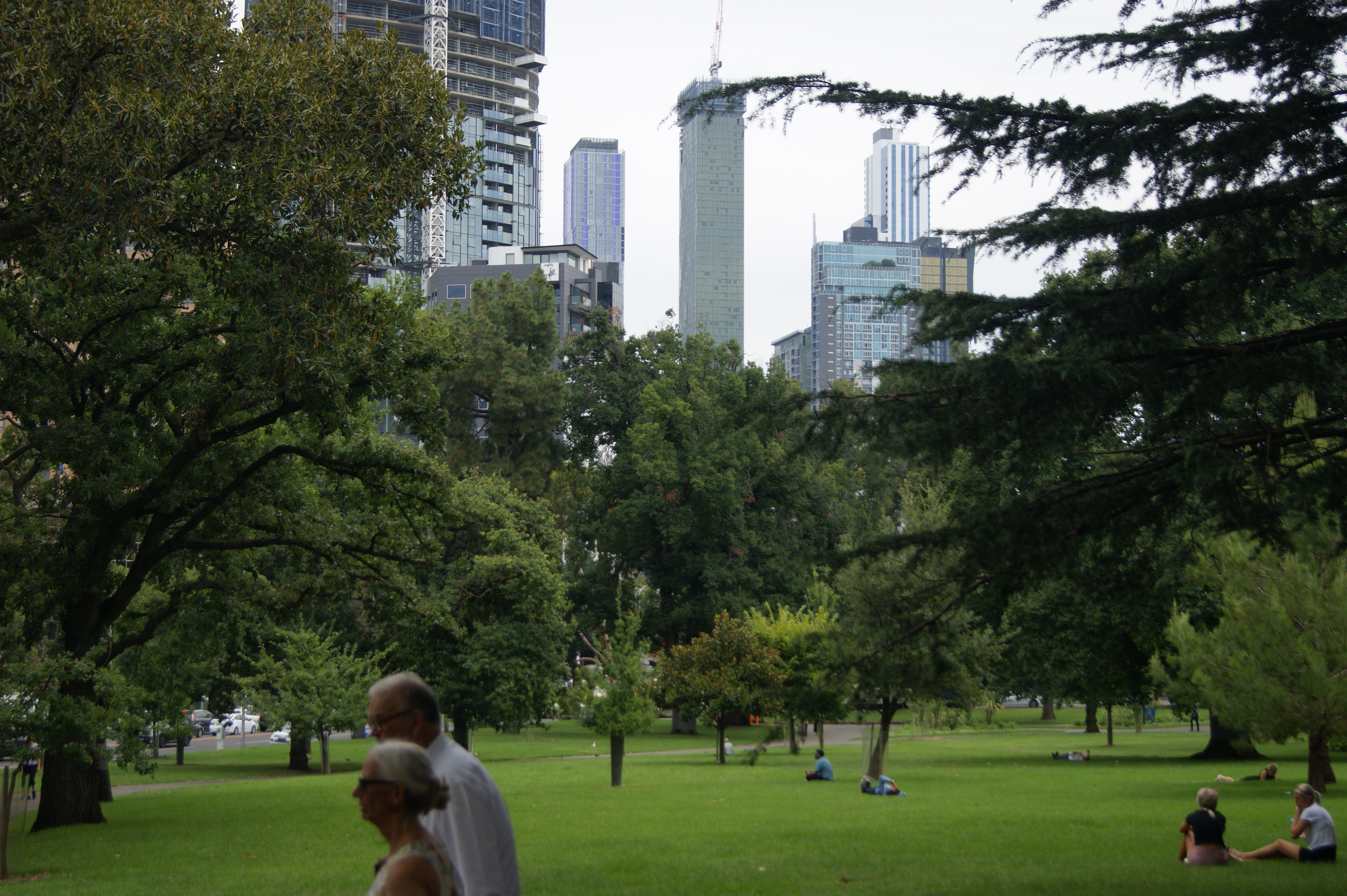
Skyscrapers of the city centre loom over Carlton Gardens

Melbourne is noted for its parks and gardens, with a ring of parks providing a green lung for the city centre. Perhaps the most notable is the Royal Botanic Gardens. Other notable gardens have been established on outskirts of Melbourne. In particular the Dandenong Ranges has the National Rhododendron Gardens, and several other public gardens. Residential gardening is a popular pastime in Melbourne, and Australia's Open Garden Scheme started in the city.

== Entertainment ==
In Melbourne there are approximately 5000 cafes and restaurants - per capita Melbourne has the most cafes/restaurants in the world. Restaurants are numerous and present a diverse range of cuisines. The city has a reputation as a culinary capital, celebrated by the annual Melbourne Food and Wine Festival. As well as the famous Little Italy of Lygon Street in Carlton, other favourite inner city dining locations for Melburnians include Fitzroy Street St Kilda, Brunswick Street Fitzroy, Victoria Street Collingwood, the CBD, and the Docklands and Southbank precincts. In 2006, Jamie Oliver selected Melbourne as the location for "Fifteen Melbourne", the Australian restaurant for his reality television show Jamie's Kitchen Australia.

Dance music is a thriving part of the Melbourne nightclub and festival scene. National dance music festivals Stereosonic and Future Music both originated in Melbourne. Melbourne is the birthplace of the Melbourne Shuffle, a style of dance that has been exported to South East Asia and continues to evolve to date.

== Shopping ==
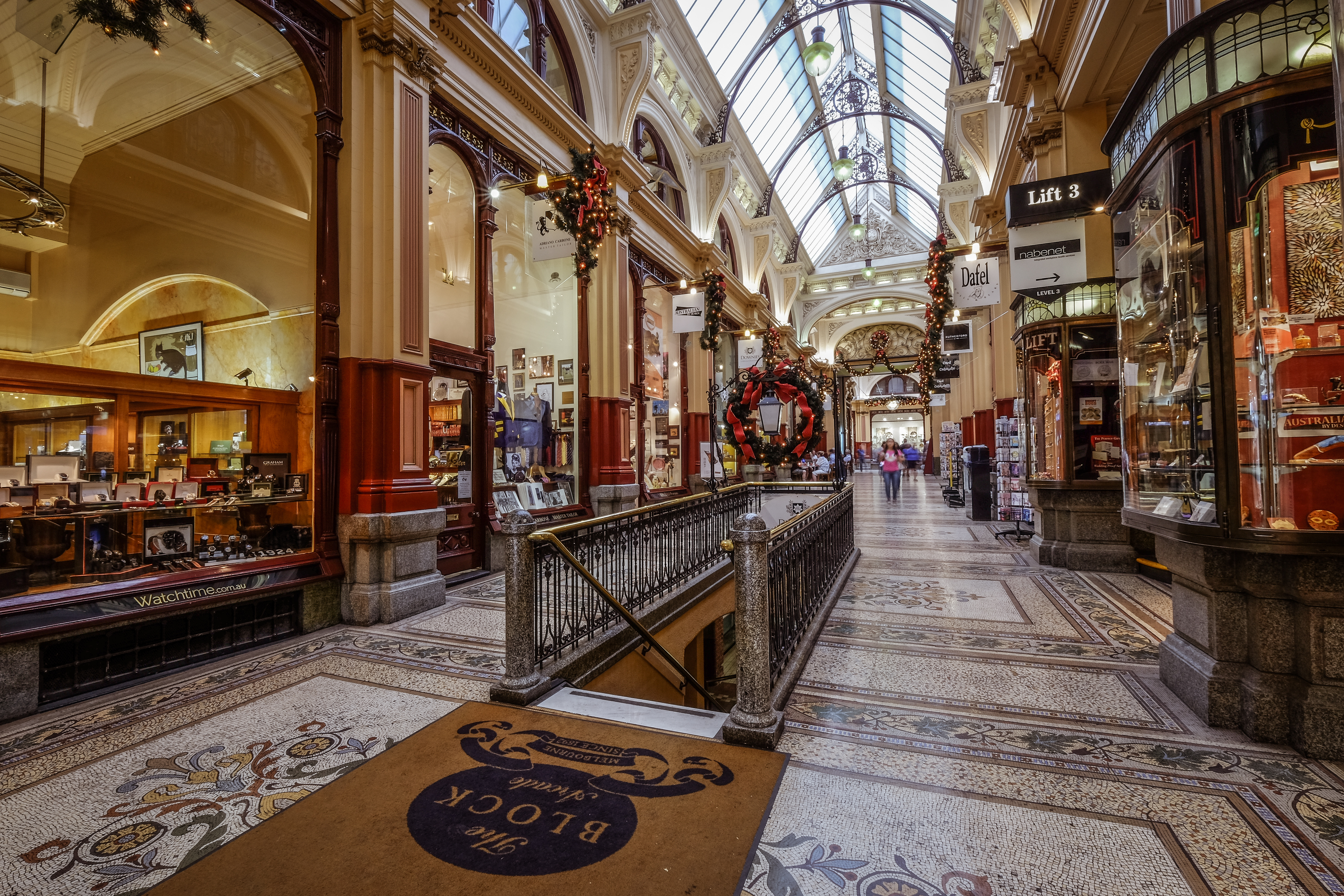
The heritage-listed Block Arcade

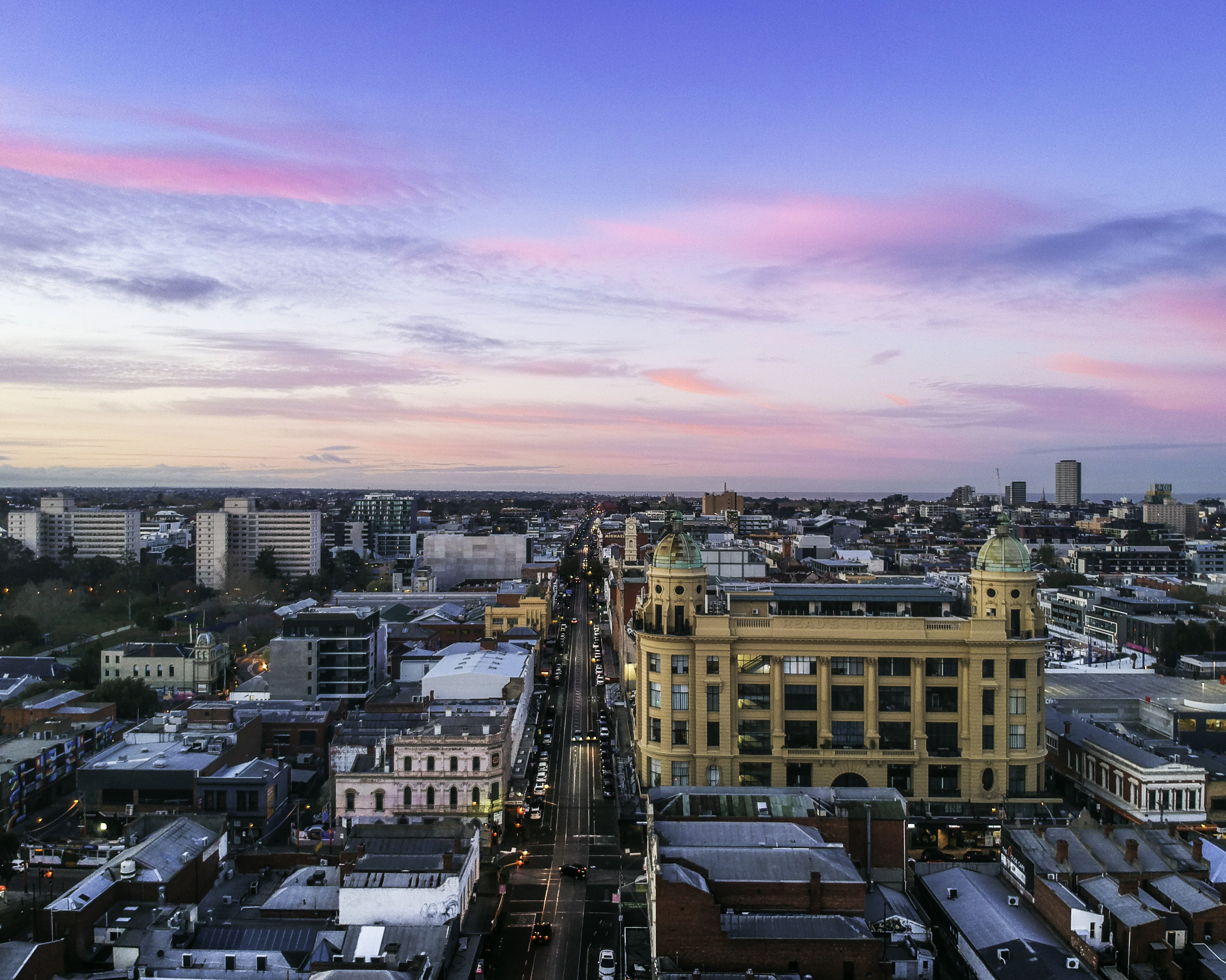
Aerial view of Chapel Street

Shopping or "retail therapy" has been a big part of Melbourne's way of life since the late 19th century, when "doing the Block" was a sign of prestige. Today, the city is home to shopping strips, such as the famous Chapel Street which stretches many blocks through South Yarra and Prahran, while heritage arcades such as the Block and the Royal Arcade and the CBD's myriad lanes.

Chadstone Shopping Centre, currently claimed to be the largest shopping centre in the southern hemisphere, markets itself as the "Fashion Capital". Strip shopping localities include Toorak Village, known for its exclusiveness, and Bridge Road in Richmond, known for its extensive factory outlets. Also there are major shopping centres throughout metropolitan Melbourne such as Westfield Airport West, Westfield Southland, Westfield Doncaster and Westfield Knox.

Melbourne is home to a number of prominent permanent food and craft markets, the largest and most prominent of which is the Victorian-era Queen Victoria Market in the central city. This market contains both indoor and outdoor sections, with the city's largest food and deli selection. Other large inner-city Victorian-era markets include the food and produce-oriented South Melbourne Market and Prahran Market. There are a number of other permanent and weekly markets held across the suburbs, including the boutique craft Rose Street Market and vintage clothing markets in Fitzroy, local food markets like Preston Market in Melbourne's north and Dandenong Market in the outer east, and weekly food and fashion markets.

== Festivals and events ==
Melbourne is home to a range of international festivals, most notably the Melbourne International Comedy Festival, Melbourne International Film Festival (MIFF), Melbourne International Arts Festival, Melbourne International Flower and Garden Show, Melbourne International Air Show and the Melbourne International Animation Festival (MIAF).

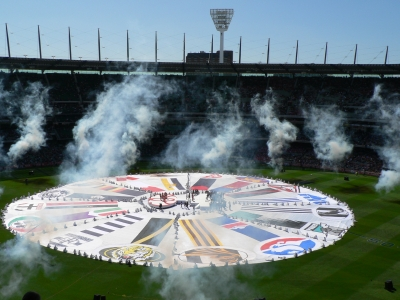
AFL Grand Final

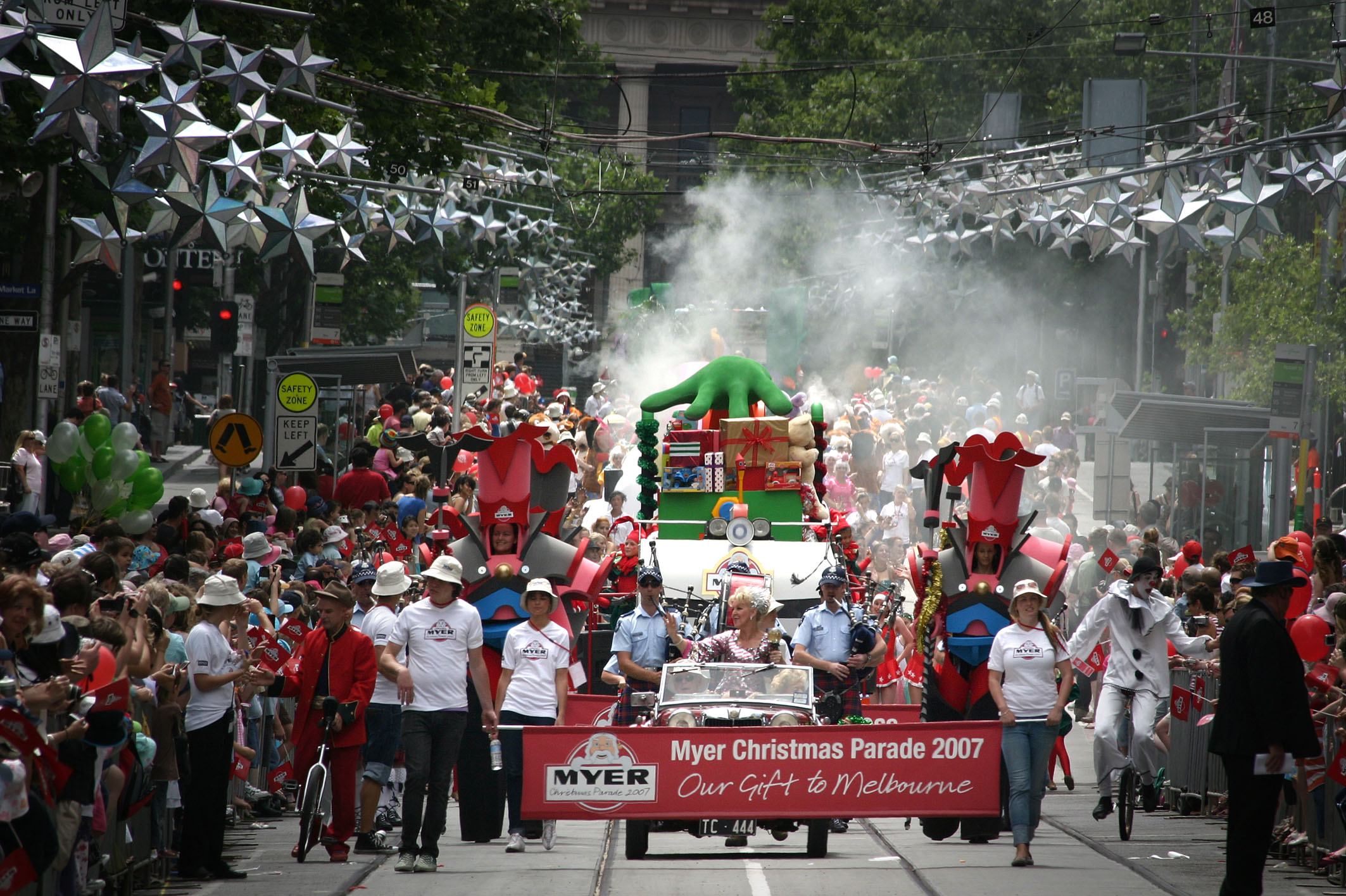
Myer Christmas Parade

- The Royal Melbourne Show has been a Melbourne tradition since 1900.
- The Boxing Day Test has been a Melbourne cricket tradition since 1950.
- Moomba is an annual festival that began in 1955 and celebrates the Yarra River; the Birdman Rally is also a Melbourne tradition.
- Several Melbourne traditions have developed around Australian rules football, particularly the annual AFL Grand Final and the Grand Final Parade
- ANZAC Day parade that concludes at the Shrine of Remembrance and also the Anzac Day football event.
- Melbourne Spring Racing Carnival
- Melbourne Fringe Festival
- Midsumma
- Melbourne Queer Film Festival
- Melbourne International Film Festival (MIFF)
- Melbourne Underground Film Festival (MUFF)
- Melbourne International Animation Festival (MIAF)
- Melbourne International Comedy Festival
- Melbourne International Singers Festival
- Melbourne Eisteddfod
- Melbourne Winter Masterpieces
- St Kilda Festival
- Melbourne Jazz Festival
- Melbourne Food and Wine Festival
- Melbourne Open House
- Brunswick Street Street Party/Northcote High St Street Party
- Big Day Out Music Festival
- Sydney Road Street Party/Brunswick Music Festival
- Great Australasian Beer SpecTAPular (GABS)
- White Night

Several national traditions originated in Melbourne: The Melbourne Cup has been a Melbourne tradition since 1861 and then became a national tradition, subsequently referred to as "the race that stops the nation"; Carols by Candlelight, first held in 1938, is a Christmas Eve tradition; the Myer Christmas windows are a very popular annual attraction; and the AFL Grand Final attracts hundreds of thousands of spectators, both live and via broadcast media, every year.

There are a number of cultural festivals that celebrate foreign cultures from within the context of the city's culture. Major festivals for Melbourne's large ethnic communities include:

- Greek Antipodes Festival
- Melbourne Italian Festival
- Asian Food Festival
- Australian Chinese New Year
- The Thai Culture and Food Festival, held in Federation Square, is one of the city's most successful festivals; as of 2012, it is in its ninth year.

== Parades and protests ==
The city's wide thoroughfares have become the conduit for the city's parades, marches and rallies. The Victorian State Library lawns are often a staging and starting point for protests and mass gatherings. The steps of the Parliament of Victoria, the Flinders Street Station intersection, Treasury Gardens, Flagstaff Gardens and Federation Square are other such locations for mass gatherings and rallies. Swanston Street and Bourke Street are widely regarded as the civic spines of the city.

Some of the largest demonstrations in the southern hemisphere have taken place in Melbourne:

- Industrial relations demonstration (2005) – more than 100,000 attendees
- Anti-Iraq War demonstration (2003) – more than 100,000 attendees
- Melbourne Vietnam Moratorium (1970) – approximately 100,000 attendees
- Save Live Australian Music (SLAM) rally (2010) – approximately 20,000 attendees
- Melbourne Locked Out 2am Lockout protest (2008) – approximately 10,000 attendees
- Three ‘Change The Rules’ rallies, organised by the trade union movement, leading up to the 2019 Australian federal election reportedly attracted 100,000–150,000 attendees on each occasion.
- School Strike 4 Climate on 20 September 2019 reportedly attracted more than 100,000 attendees in Melbourne.
- Invasion Day rallies, which take place annually on January 26 in protest against Australia Day and to highlight Indigenous injustice attract tens of thousands of attendees.
- Black Lives Matter protests on 6 June 2020 also attracted tens of thousands of people despite restrictions put in place because of the COVID-19 pandemic.

=== Trade unionism ===
Melbourne is regarded as the home of the trade union movement in Australia, with the headquarters of the Australian Council of Trade Unions located in the city; Melbourne is also the birthplace of the Australian "eight-hour day", when the change was introduced into the building industry. Melbourne also has a particularly significant history of strike action.

The Eureka flag, from the Eureka Rebellion, is a Victorian emblem that is often used by protest groups.

== See also ==
- Culture of Australia
- Media in Melbourne
- List of songs about Melbourne
- List of movies filmed in Melbourne
- List of museums in Melbourne
- Parks and gardens of Melbourne
- Sport in Victoria
- Melbourne street art
- Melbourne performing art venues
