= Wigston (disambiguation) =

Wigston is a town in England.

Wigston may also refer to:

- Wigston Parva
- South Wigston
- William Wigston (disambiguation)
