= William Wigston =

William Wigston may refer to:

- William Wyggeston, merchant
- William Wigston (MP) (by 1509–1577), MP for Leicester and Warwickshire
- William Bernard Wigston, founder of the oldest language bookshop, Foreign Language Bookshop, in Australasia
