= Preston Market =

Market in Victoria, Australia

- Interactive map of the Preston Market area

General information
- Status: Open
- Type: Public food, produce and flea market
- Location: Preston, Victoria, Australia
- Coordinates: 37.7389°S 145.0021°E
- Construction started: 1969
- Completed: 1970
- Owner: Medich Corporation

Technical details
- Size: 4.3 ha (11 acres)

The Preston Market is a public marketplace located in the suburb of Preston in Melbourne, Australia. It is the second-largest market in Melbourne with over 80,000 visitors per week.

== History ==
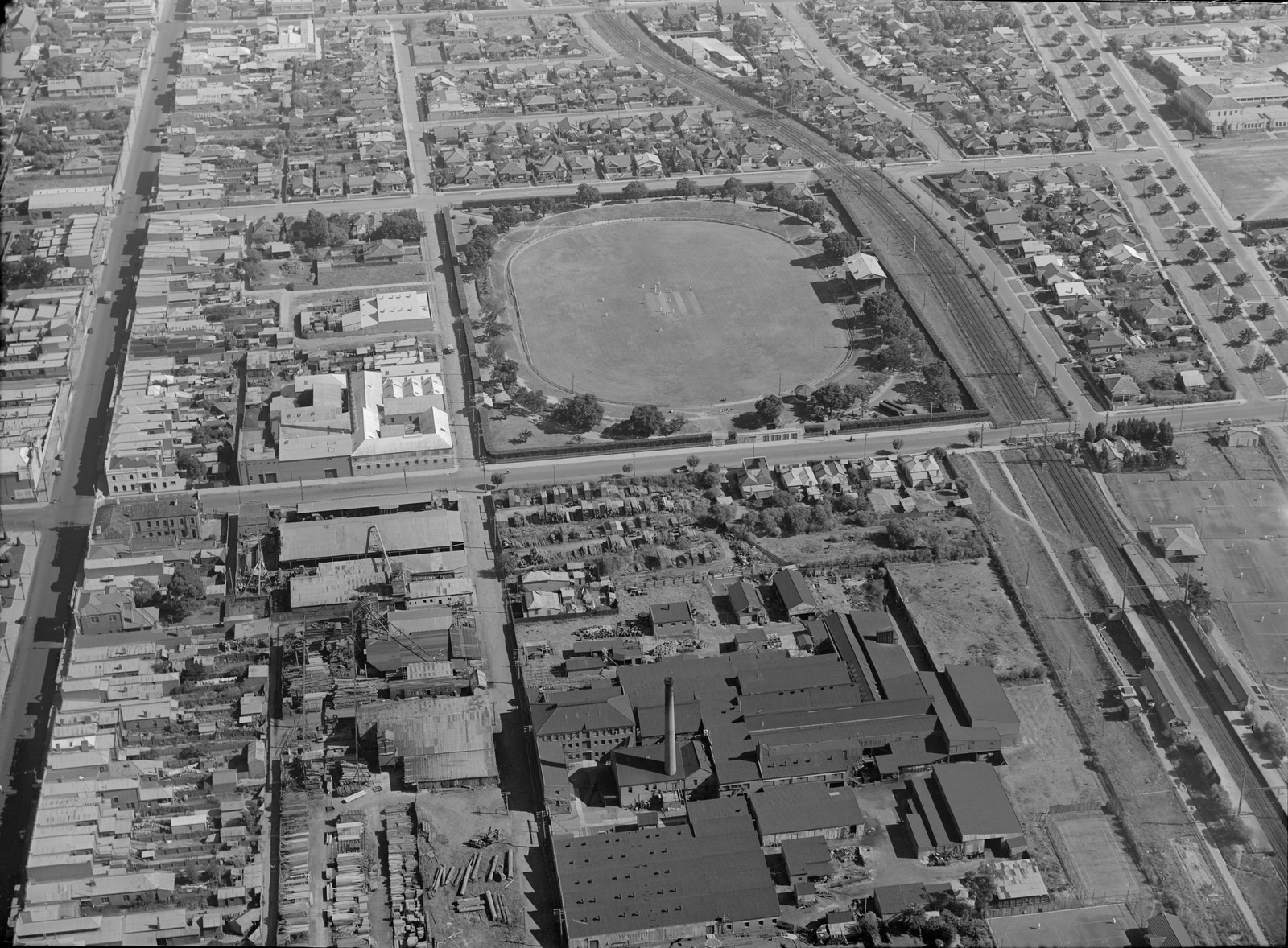
1948 aerial photo of the Broadhurst Tannery, the present-day site of the Preston Market.

The land on which the Market is located was home to the local Wurundjeri people. In 1888, the Broadhurst Tannery was set up on the site.

In 1954, the Victorian State Government's Melbourne Metropolitan Planning Scheme identified Preston as a suburban centre to be developed with housing, retail and commercial activities, including the site. The tannery was demolished in 1964 which opened up the site to development in line with this strategic plan.

The market opened on 11 August 1970 with over 250 individual stalls including delis, fresh food and general retail. It was notable for being designed as a pedestrianised open-air market at a time when most new shopping centres were in enclosed, air-conditioned buildings. Preston soon became known for its multicultural mix including Greek and Italian goods.

A market hall building was constructed shortly afterwards on Cramer Street soon after the three houses on the site were purchased and demolished in 1973. It was known as the "Market Hall" and refurbished in 2016.

Canopies covering the pedestrian walkways were added in the 1980s.

=== Redevelopment ===
In 2004, Salta Properties and Medich Property Group purchased the market for $AUD 36.75 million with the intention to redevelop the site. While some construction occurred on the periphery, such as an office building on Murray Road, design work progressed slowly.

A masterplan for the Preston Market site was adopted by Darebin City Council in 2007 as part of implementing the Preston Central Activity Centre Structure plan. This was developed as part of the Victorian State Government's Melbourne 2030 strategic plan for metropolitan Melbourne to encourage development in key locations across the suburbs.

Due to economic conditions the first stage of this plan was not implemented until 2016. This included modernising the existing market with new shops, trader facilities and customer information improvements. Soon afterwards, the Victorian Planning Authority reviewed planning regulations for the area in 2017.

This culminated in a public consultation on a revised plan to redevelop the site. Although it contained many similar elements to the original 2007 masterplan, some changes were proposed. Many community groups mounted campaigns against developing the area including the Darebin Appropriate Development Association (DADA) and Save the Preston Market. They argued that constructing new buildings - mostly apartments - would negatively affect the market and its social and cultural history. The project gained significant community interest with opposition to the redevelopment cited as a major factor in a 20 percent swing against the Australian Labor Party in a previously-safe seat at the 2022 Victorian state election.

The process concluded in 2023 when the Victorian Government introduced planning controls and a heritage overlay that required significant parts of the market structure to be retained and reduced the ability for the site to be developed from 2,000 dwellings to 1,200. Soon afterwards, Salta Properties sold its 50% stake in the Market.

== Description ==
The market is located adjacent to the Preston railway station and bus routes on Murray Road and High Street. It is divided into sections across four buildings that are connected by two covered pedestrian streets on a north-south and east-west axis. A large surface carpark almost completely surrounds the market.
