= Foreign Language Bookshop =

Defunct language bookshop in Melbourne, Australia

Foreign Language Bookshop was a large language bookshop in Melbourne. It was originally established in 1938 as a lending library and was transformed into a bookshop during the late 1940s. It has been called the largest language bookshop in Australasia in the 1950s before the arrival of the Continental Bookshop and Abbeys's Language Book Centre.

== Early years ==
In 1938 the Foreign Language Library, a commercial lending library was launched in Bourke Street, Melbourne in 1938.

During World War II, the library was forced to move new premises in the State Savings Bank House at 159 Elizabeth Street (at the corner of Bourke Street), Melbourne. It was at this site that the library became known as the Foreign Library and Bookshop and then, from 1950, as the Foreign Language Bookshop.

== The founder ==
According to two websites associated with the bookshop, the Foreign Language Bookshop, the lending library was founded by William Bernard Wigston, who had been born and raised in Ashtead, Surrey, England, and who, with his younger brother Nigel, managed mines in South Africa in the late 1920s, and then finally migrated to Australia in the early 1930s.

Wigston's primary aim for his lending library, and later of the Foreign Language Bookshop which it became, was to reduce migrant isolation, particularly for European migrants from Germany, France, Italy, Czechoslovakia and Austria, disembarking from ships into Australia. Over time, increasing immigration from many other countries sparked the need to expand into new languages.

Wigston was further reported to have managed the library-then-bookshop until he died in 1956 and left money in his will to all staff and willed the business of Foreign Language Bookshop to Mrs. Connie Tink.

Ernest Leser and I. Leser, the bookshop's later proprietors, stated in an interview with The Age that Wigston was in fact a Scot. A Sydney Morning Herald article about the Foreign Language Bookshop similarly called him a "Scotsman".

== Later decades ==
The new proprietor from 1956, Connie Tink, sold the Foreign Language Bookshop in 1959 to Mrs. Felder, who in turn sold it to Mrs. Leser. In about 1975 Mrs. Leser sold the business to Mrs. Annette Monester.

During 1982, Monester moved the business to the top end of Collins Street, Melbourne.

In 2006 she passed control of the Foreign Language Bookshop to Jacob Miceli. In 2011 the bookshop, which was still managed by Miceli and at that time was known as FLB Education, was merged with Bookery, a bookshop specialising in "materials for teachers and students of literacy and English as a second language", resulting in a new firm known as Bookery Pty. Ltd. In June 2020 Bookery closed its "bricks and mortar" premises and became an online bookshop.
