= Windsor Road cycleway =

- Length: 31 kilometres (19 mi)
- Location: Sydney, New South Wales, Australia
- Established: May 2007 (east); 2008 (west)
- Trailheads: Parramatta (south) to; Windsor (northwest)
- Use: Cycling; pedestrians (shared use path); Bus rapid transit (off-road cycleway)
- Elevation gain/loss: ▲164 metres (538 ft); ▼158 metres (518 ft)
- Highest point: 89 metres (292 ft) AHD
- Lowest point: 10 metres (33 ft) AHD
- Difficulty: Easy
- Season: All seasons

The Windsor Road cycleway is a predominantly off-road 31-kilometre-long (19 mi) cyclepath between Parramatta Park and Macquarie Street, Windsor that is generally aligned with the Windsor Road and Old Windsor Road.

== Route ==
The cycleway accesses the North-West T-way between Darcy Road, Westmead to Windsor. Some major road crossings are required, particularly on Old Windsor Road but all are controlled by traffic lights. There are connections to the Parramatta Valley cycleway via Parramatta Park, Toongabbie and Girraween Creek via McCoy Park, Toongabbie Creek cycleway, Blacktown via Sunnyholt Road cycleway and to the M7 cycleway at Bella Vista. Between the 14-mile (23 km) stretch from Westmead to Rouse Hill there are some 26 traffic light controlled road crossings and therefore riding along this cycleway is a very stop-start process. There is a steep climb from Abbott Road up to Seven Hills Road when travelling north.

== See also ==
- Bike paths in Sydney
- Cycling in New South Wales
- Cycling in Sydney
