= M5 cycleway =

- Length: 32 kilometres (20 mi)
- Location: Sydney, New South Wales, Australia
- Trailheads: Arncliffe (east) to; Prestons (southwest)
- Use: Cycling (on road)
- Elevation gain/loss: ▲168 metres (551 ft); ▼135 metres (443 ft)
- Highest point: 57 metres (187 ft) AHD
- Lowest point: 5 metres (16 ft) AHD
- Difficulty: Moderate
- Season: All seasons
- Surface: Predominantly on-road

The M5 cycleway is a predominantly on road 32-kilometre-long (20 mi) cycleway generally aligned with the M5 motorway in south-western Sydney, New South Wales, Australia. The eastern terminus of the cycleway is in Arncliffe where it connects with the Cooks River cycleway. The southwestern terminus of the cycleway is in Prestons where is connects with the M7 cycleway. The cycleway does not have a separate cycle lane or path, instead cyclists use the breakdown lane.

Cycling in the M5 East Tunnel is prohibited.

== Route ==
As of June 2016, due to road works near the King Georges Road interchange, the breakdown lane is closed and cyclists must exit and ride through back streets. There is an off-road shared cyclepath that runs from Bexley Road in Kingsgrove to Belmore Road in Riverwood, but it is not well marked and some road crossings required. A connection to Salt Pan Creek shared path to Bankstown is possible at the Riverwood end.

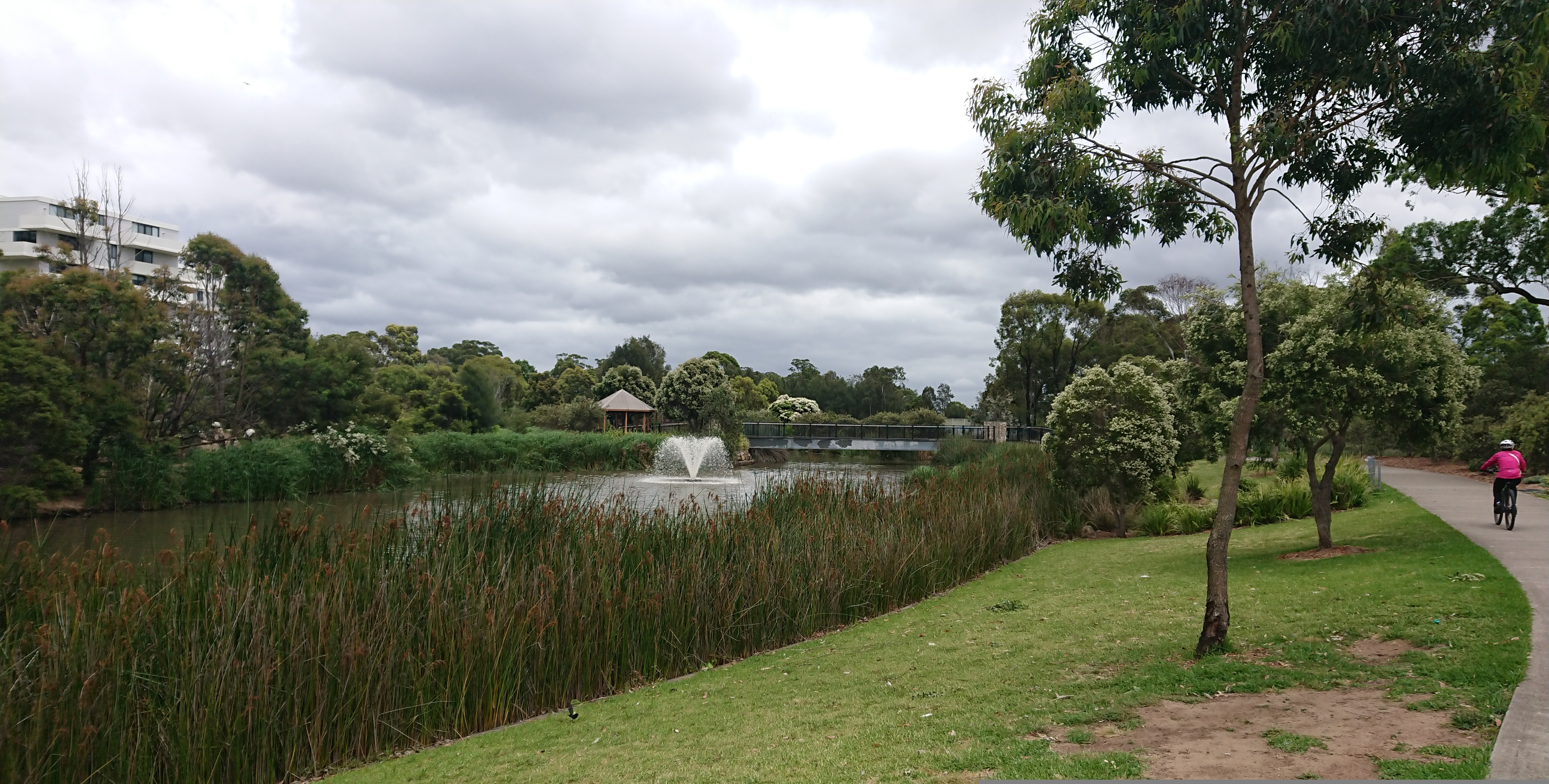
M5 off-road cycleway at Riverwood Wetlands Playground

== See also ==
- Bike paths in Sydney
- Cycling in New South Wales
- Cycling in Sydney
