= M2 cycleway =

Cycle route in Sydney, New South Wales, Australia

- Length: 22 kilometres (14 mi)
- Location: Sydney, New South Wales, Australia
- Trailheads: Glenwood (northwest) to; North Ryde (east)
- Use: Cycling (on road)
- Elevation gain/loss: ▲229 metres (751 ft); ▼228 metres (748 ft)
- Highest point: 133 metres (436 ft) AHD
- Lowest point: 41 metres (135 ft) AHD
- Difficulty: Moderate
- Season: All seasons
- Surface: Predominantly on-road

The M2 cycleway is a predominantly on road 22-kilometre-long (14 mi) cycleway generally aligned with the M2 motorway in the Hills District of Sydney, New South Wales, Australia. The north-western terminus of the cycleway is in Glenwood and the eastern terminus is in North Ryde. As the M2 does not have a separate cycle lane or path, the cycleway comprises the breakdown lane of the roadway.

== Route ==
Cycling access was removed in 2010 during construction work to upgrade the M2. During that time, cyclists were required to use an alternate route on suburban streets that was 5 kilometres (3.1 mi) longer, steeper and slower. The design of the alternative route was criticised due to safety concerns. In August 2013 access was restored westbound from Delhi Road to Windsor Road. Citybound access was restored only for the section from Windsor Road to Pennant Hills Road due to work to stabilise the embankment near the eastbound lanes at Marsfield. There is an alternate route citybound.

As a result of the construction of the NorthConnex cycleway access to the M2 both east and westbound between Pennant Hills Road and Windsor Road was removed with effect from February 2012 adding a further 7 kilometres (4.3 mi) via a detour route; with work expected to be completed by 2020.

The M2 cycleway connects to the M7 cycleway at Seven Hills at its north-western terminus and to the Gore Hill and Epping Road cycleways at North Ryde at its eastern terminus.

== See also ==
- Bike paths in Sydney
- Cycling in New South Wales
- Cycling in Sydney
