= Parramatta Valley cycleway =

Shared use path in Sydney, New South Wales, Australia

Parramatta Valley Cycleway
- Length: 15 kilometres (9.3 mi)
- Location: Sydney, New South Wales, Australia
- Trailheads: Morrison Bay Park in Ryde (east) to; Parramatta Park in Parramatta (west)
- Use: Cycling; pedestrians
- Elevation gain/loss: ▲60 metres (200 ft); ▼54 metres (177 ft)
- Highest point: 24 metres (79 ft) AHD
- Lowest point: 4 metres (13 ft) AHD
- Difficulty: Easy
- Season: All seasons

The Parramatta Valley cycleway is a 15-kilometre-long (9.3 mi) shared-use path for cyclists and pedestrians that is generally aligned with the Parramatta River in Sydney, New South Wales, Australia. The eastern terminus of the cycleway is at Morrison Bay Park in Ryde and heads west along dedicated bike paths, quiet streets and the river foreshore to its western terminus at Parramatta Park in Parramatta.

== Route ==
There is a short on-road section along Lancaster Avenue Melrose Park, and elevated steel mesh boardwalks through Ermington Nature Reserve. There used to be a further short on-road section via Pike Street and South Street Rydalmere to Subiaco Creek, but this is no longer the case since the Subiaco Creek link opened in June 2017. There is an elevated steel mesh boardwalk through Baludarri Wetlands. Cyclists cross Macarthur Street, Parramatta then use the Gasworks Bridge to continue along the south side of the Parramatta River, before crossing back to the north side at the Parramatta ferry wharf. The decision to put a tunnel through Lennox Bridge was controversial, but the tunnel opened in 2015 and links the cycleway with Parramatta Park. There are connections to Rhodes and Olympic Park via Ryde Bridge or Meadowbank Railway Bridge; to Windsor Road cycleway via Parramatta Park and Westmead and then connecting to the M7 cycleway and to the M4 cycleway via Harris Street and Good Street, Harris Park.

In September 2016, the NSW Government and Parramatta Council announced plans to complete a missing link adjacent to Subiaco Creek in Rydalmere. The $4.5 million project was completed in June 2017.

== Cycleway use ==
In the 12 months to February 2014, between 175 and 300 cyclists used the Parramatta Valley cycleway at Rydalmere on an average weekday, with a greater number on the weekend.

== See also ==
- Bike paths in Sydney
- Cycling in New South Wales
- Cycling in Sydney
