= Sydney Harbour Bridge cycleway =

Cycling path in Sydney, New South Wales, Australia

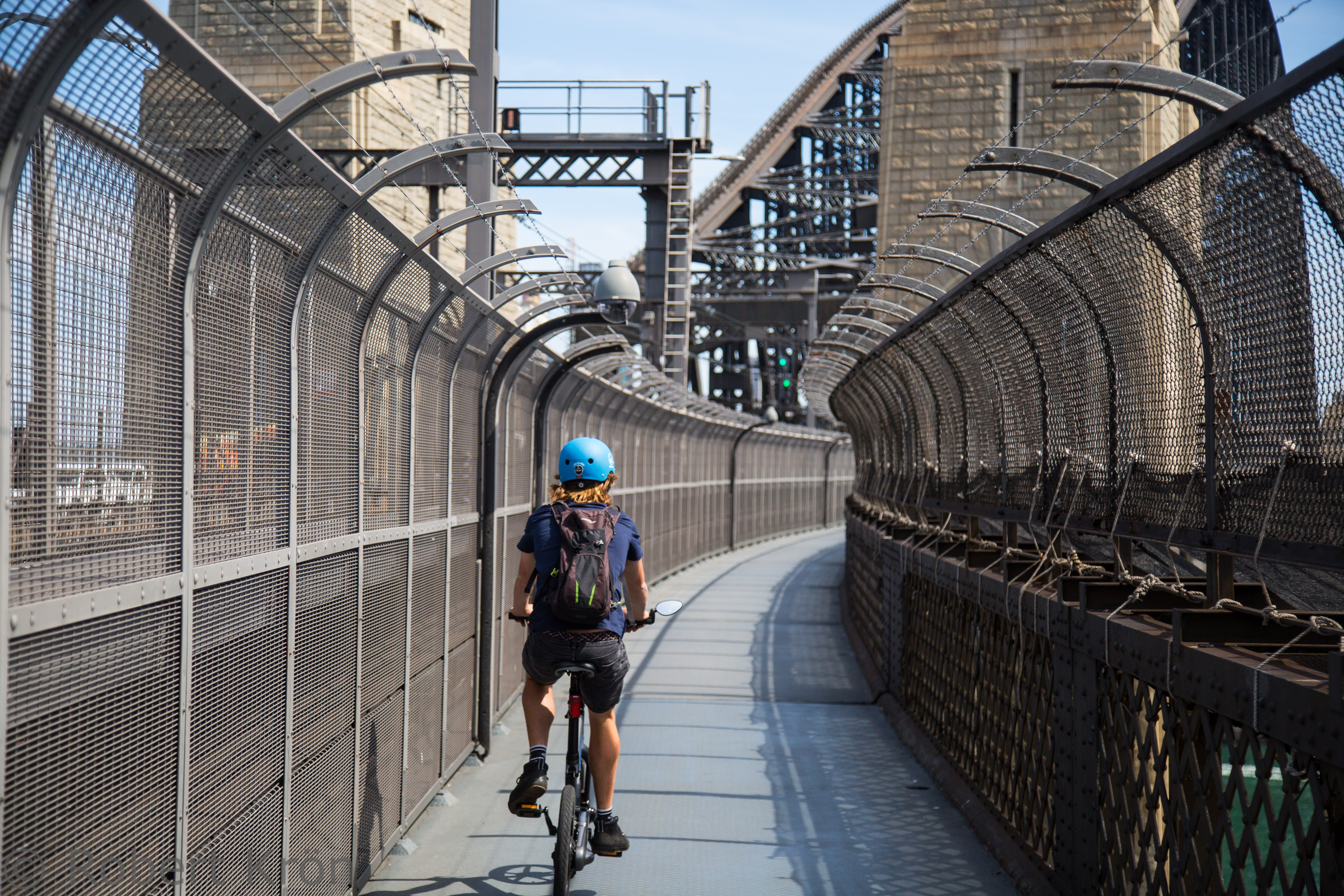
- A cyclist riding north to south along the cycleway in 2015
- Length: 2 kilometres (1.2 mi)
- Location: Sydney, New South Wales, Australia
- Trailheads: Milsons Point (north) to; Millers Point (south)
- Use: Cycling only
- Highest point: 51 metres (167 ft) AHD
- Lowest point: 14 metres (46 ft) AHD
- Difficulty: Easy
- Season: All seasons

The Sydney Harbour Bridge cycleway is a 2-kilometre-long (1.2 mi) conjoined cycleway from the north and south that crosses the Sydney Harbour Bridge on its western side, linking the Sydney central business district with North Sydney, Sydney's Northern Suburbs and the North Shore, in Sydney, New South Wales, Australia.

== Route ==
The southern terminus of the cycleway is at Millers Point with access to Argyle Street and Upper Fort Street in The Rocks. At its southern terminus near the Sydney Observatory, the cycleway is located adjacent to the Western Distributor and connects with the Kent Street cycleway. The northern terminus of the cycleway is at Burton Street, Milsons Point, just below Milsons Point railway station. Access here is by a cycle-only curving ramp, 3 metres (9.8 ft) wide and 170 metres (560 ft) long and with a gradient of 5 percent at its steepest, which opened on 6 January 2026.

== Ramp controversy ==
Before the ramp was added, riders on this popular cycling route to the CBD had to ascend 55 steps in order to access the path, which is located on the roadway level, some 51 metres (167 ft) above the water level. A campaign to eliminate these steps began at least in 2008.

This campaign produced the HarbourLink proposal to give better access to the Sydney Harbour Bridge's northern approach. The NSW Bike Plan 2010 identified Naremburn to the Harbour Bridge as one of 13 major missing links and a priority metropolitan link. On 7 December 2016, NSW Roads Minister Duncan Gay confirmed that the northern stairway would be replaced with a A$20 million ramp, alleviating the need for cyclists to dismount. At the same time the NSW Government announced plans to upgrade the southern ramp at a projected cost of A$15 million.

As of April 2021, Transport for NSW refused to release current plans, partly because it would be unable to “deal with the anticipated volume of communications” from the public. On 3 May, two preferred options were revealed: a two-storey spiral and a long slope. There was local opposition to both options. In August, the government announced that consultation had attracted about 2,800 responses of which 82% favoured a linear option, and in December it opened a public competition among three shortlisted linear designs. On 1 April 2022, it was announced that a 200-metre ramp, with an average gradient of 2 per cent, had been approved. That plan was controversial, but was approved by North Sydney Council on 28 February 2023 and by the Heritage Council of New South Wales in June 2023, to continuing objections. Construction commenced in August 2024, and the new ramp was opened on 6 January 2026. The 55 steps remain, for those who may wish to use them.

For the northern terminus there is a long-term plan to link the Sydney Harbour Bridge cycleway with the Gore Hill and Epping Road cycleways, to the northwest.

== Cycleway use ==
In 2019, the average number of cycle trips varied between 1,500 and 2,000 on an average weekday.

The New South Wales Roads Regulation 2018 provides that a person must not ride a bicycle on any part of the Sydney Harbour Bridge other than a cycleway.

== See also ==
- Bike paths in Sydney
- Cycling in New South Wales
- Cycling in Sydney
