= Gore Hill and Epping Road cycleways =

Shared use path in Sydney, New South Wales, Australia

- Length: 8.4 kilometres (5.2 mi)
- Location: Sydney, New South Wales, Australia
- Established: May 2007 (east); 2008 (west)
- Trailheads: Naremburn (east) to; North Ryde (west)
- Use: Cycling; pedestrians (shared use path); Bus lane (on road cycleway)
- Elevation gain/loss: ▲106 metres (348 ft); ▼127 metres (417 ft)
- Highest point: 102 metres (335 ft) AHD
- Lowest point: 105 metres (344 ft) AHD
- Difficulty: Easy
- Season: All seasons

The Gore Hill and Epping Road cycleways is a 8.4-kilometre-long (5.2 mi) conjoined shared use path for cyclists and pedestrians, and an on road cycleway located in the lower north shore of Sydney, New South Wales, Australia. The eastern terminus of the cycleway is in Naremburn, while the western terminus is in North Ryde.

== Route ==
The eastern terminus of the cycleway is at Merrenburn Avenue, Naremburn. The eastern segment of the conjoined 4-metre-wide (13 ft) cycleway, opened in 2007, follows the direction of the Gore Hill Freeway, west to Willoughby Road where it proceeds over Willoughby Road on a shared pedestrian and cycleway bridge. Form here the cycleway continues west alongside the Gore Hill Freeway, where it climbs up a ramp to the Pacific Highway. Travelling west, initially alongside Longueville Road and then Epping Road where the bus lane is permitted to be used by cyclists, the western segment of the conjoined cycleway was completed in 2008 at a cost of A$7.6 million. The cycleway ends at Wicks Road in North Ryde.

The nearest connecting railway stations are North Sydney, St Leonards, Artarmon and Macquarie Park.

At the junction of Epping Road and Delhi Road, cyclists can transfer from the M2 cycleway, operating east bound only.

At the eastern terminus there is a long-term plan to link the Gore Hill and Epping Road cycleways with the Sydney Harbour Bridge cycleway, to the southeast.

== Cycleway use ==
In the twelve months to February 2014, between 400 and 500 cyclists used the cycleway at Merrenburn Avenue on an average weekday.

In 2008 the NRMA called for the Epping Road segment of the cycleway to be scrapped, claiming that it registered 25 trips per day on this segment. Three years later in an academic study of use of the cycleway by cyclists and pedestrians front that on a peak day in November 2011 a total of 271 cyclists and 164 pedestrians were counted on the shared-use path at a set point on the southern side of Epping Road, east of the junction with Mowbray Road West; with a similar result some fourteen days later.

== See also ==
- Bike paths in Sydney
- Cycling in New South Wales
- Cycling in Sydney
