= M4 cycleway =

Cycle path it Sydney, New South Wales, Australia

- Length: 15 kilometres (9.3 mi)
- Location: Sydney, New South Wales, Australia
- Trailheads: Sydney Olympic Park (east) to; South Wentworthville (west)
- Use: Cycling; pedestrians
- Highest point: 49 metres (161 ft) AHD
- Lowest point: 3 metres (9.8 ft) AHD
- Difficulty: Easy
- Season: All seasons

The M4 cycleway is a 15-kilometre-long (9.3 mi) shared use path for cyclists and pedestrians that is generally aligned with the M4 Motorway in Sydney, New South Wales, Australia. The eastern terminus of the cycleway is in Sydney Olympic Park, while the western terminus is in South Wentworthville.

== Route ==
=== Sydney Olympic Park to Auburn ===
With an extensive network of on-road and shared paths located within Sydney Olympic Park, the cycleways eastern terminus is on Australia Avenue and continues west via the Holker Busway where the shared busway and on-road cycleway cross the Haslams Creek and meet with Hill Road. From this junction in Newington, several options are available to meet the north–south shared pedestrian and cycle path, the Louise Sauvage Pathway, shared with the cycleway, as it heads south and follows the western bank of Haslams Creek which can be hazardous at points of high tide. The path goes under the M4 and enters Lidcombe, initially as a segregated path and then joins Adderley Street East before joining a major intersection with Silverwater Road (A6), with traffic exiting the M4 from the east and entering the M4, heading west and limited cyclist and pedestrian protection on the traffic island.

The path continues along Adderley Street West, from Silverwater into Auburn, climbing to a roundabout at Stubbs Street, subject to heavy flows during peak traffic times. As the path continues further west it passes the former Transport for NSW toll plaza. The main path crosses the Duck River and continues further west. A spur path leads south, to the Great Western Highway (A44).

=== Auburn to Parramatta ===
The relatively scenic route on the northern shore of the Duck River carries the cycleway further west. Signs along the path explain the history of the industrial heartland of the area including a now-defunct Duck River ferry service that allowed passengers and freight to alight. In this ear, the path crosses former freight tracks. The end of this part of the pathway is the quiet, back streets of Rosehill, parallel to Parramatta Road. From Rosehill to Harris Park the path continues west towards Parramatta. The start of this path adjoins an L-plate motorcycle school and a small corkscrew climb to reach the bridge that runs overhead of James Ruse Drive and on the northern side of the M4. The bridge is a remarkable piece of industrial art and allows cyclists to be protected from the traffic. The path is secure at this stage and it winds down underneath the M4, above the Duck Creek and the A'Becketts Creek. The path runs through the middle of the M4 cement columns which forms a scenic reminder, albeit suburban, of the functionality of the path.

The path continues to follow the cement colonnade of the M4. On either side of the path are access points from Harris Park. Near the junction of Parramatta Road, Church Street, and Woodville Road, where the M4 passes over the junction, the cycleway provides various spur options: the north to Parramatta central business district via High, Wigram, or Railway Streets; and to the south to Merrylands and Holroyd via Woodville Road and adjacent side-streets. The A'Becketts Creek Community Street Library sits along the path at Junction Street. The guerilla street library was created by local residents in May 2021 and aims to foster a sense of community along the M4 corridor.

=== Parramatta to Wentworthville ===
Between Fox Street, Holroyd and Ledger Road, Merrylands the cycleway becomes a 675-metre-long (2,215 ft) off-road shared bicycle and pedestrian path. Constructed between 2010 and 2011, the 3-metre-wide (9.8 ft) path was built along the southern embankment of the M4 motorway about 2 metres (6 ft 7 in) above the road level and is completely fenced off and protected from motorway traffic. Continuing west and after crossing Burnett Street, the cycleway joins Rita Street where it provides a spur option to the north via an underpass to access Rees and Peggy Streets and then north to Parramatta Park. The cycleway crosses Coleman Street, Merrylands and continues west before reaching a junction with Allen Street and the Finlayson Creek. Here, a spur line to the north passes under the M4 and provides access to a road crossing of the Great Western Highway and the Wentworthville shopping centre. Another spur line follows Finlayson Creek to the south, with local access to Merrylands.

Continuing 100–150 metres (330–490 ft) further west, the cycleway terminates at a junction near the Old Prospect Road on the boundary between Merrylands, South Wentworthville, Greystanes and Pendle Hill, where the cycleway seamlessly joins the Liverpool–Parramatta T-way.

== Cycleway use ==
In the twelve months to February 2014, between 30 and 40 cyclists used the M4 cyclepath at Holroyd West on an average weekday.

== See also ==
- Bike paths in Sydney
- Cycling in New South Wales
- Cycling in Sydney
