= Cooks River cycleway =

Shared use path in Sydney, New South Wales, Australia

- Length: 30 kilometres (19 mi)
- Location: Sydney, New South Wales, Australia
- Trailheads: Settlers' Park, Ryde (northwest) to; Botany Bay, Kyeemagh (southwest)
- Use: Cycling; pedestrians
- Elevation gain/loss: ▲147 metres (482 ft); ▼152 metres (499 ft)
- Highest point: 36 metres (118 ft) AHD
- Lowest point: 2 metres (6 ft 7 in) AHD
- Difficulty: Easy
- Season: All seasons

The Cooks River cycleway, also called the Bay to Bay Shared Pathway, is a 30-kilometre-long (19 mi) shared use path for cyclists and pedestrians in the Inner West of Sydney, New South Wales, Australia. The north-western terminus of the cycleway is in Settlers' Park, Ryde, from where it proceeds south, crossing the Parramatta River and skirting Homebush Bay to the Cooks River, from where it generally follows the course of the river south and east to the south-eastern terminus on Botany Bay at Kyeemagh. The alternative name "Bay to Bay" or "B2B" path refers to Homebush Bay and Botany Bay. The path connects a series of parklands in the City of Ryde and the Municipality of Strathfield, as well as the riverside green spaces along the course of the Cooks River.

== Route ==
=== Ryde to Strathfield ===
Branching off the Parramatta Valley cycleway at Waterview Street, Ryde, the cycleway starts at Settlers Park and crosses the Parramatta River via the path on the eastern side of Ryde Bridge and then cuts back under the southern end of the bridge at Llewellyn Street, Rhodes. Emerging on the western side of the bridge, a laneway leads to Leeds Street, which can be followed either on or off road under John Whitton Bridge to Walker Street and then south, past Rhodes railway station and onto the path along the western side of the Main Northern railway line to Alfred Street and turn right into Oulton Avenue, past its exit ramp access to Homebush Bay Drive and turn left into Bicentennial Park.

The cycleway continues through Bicentennial Park to the Victoria Avenue gates, on the northern side of Victoria Avenue, under Homebush Bay Drive and cross Victoria Avenue on the eastern side of Homebush Bay Drive into the Powells Creek Reserve. Follow the path past the sporting fields to the tennis courts. Cross over Powells Creek canal via the bridge and follow the path along the western side of Powells Creek to Pomeroy Street, Homebush. The path continues east along the northern side of Pomeroy Street to Underwood Road and crosses the M4 motorway via the pedestrian/cycle overpass. Turn left into Park Road and then right into Hillcrest Road until it reaches Parramatta Road; crossed at the traffic signals at Bridge Road and then followed over the railway line and turn right into The Crescent, Homebush.

Follow The Crescent to Bates Street where you leave the road to access the path through Airey Park, and cross Fraser Street to Melville Reserve. Ride through Melville Reserve and then turn left into Hampstead Road, Homebush West. Turn right into Arthur Street and then left into Mitchell Road in Strathfield. Follow Mitchell Road to its end past Karuah Street and onto the path along the eastern side of Centenary Drive. Follow the path, turn left at the access to Barker Street/Newton Road and proceed along Newton Road across Pemberton Street. Turn right into Melville Avenue and follow to Ada Avenue. At Ada Avenue join the off-road path through Freshwater Park, Strathfield. Cross Hedges Avenue via Augusta Street and rejoin the off-road path at Chain of Ponds Reserve.

=== Strathfield to Kyeemagh ===
The route follows the banks of the Cooks River and passes under the Hume Highway (A22) and Water Street and through Ford Park to Maria Street. After crossing Maria Street, the path passes through the car park, and rejoins the off-road path under Punchbowl Road. Follow the path to a short on-road section along Walsh Avenue and then on through Whiddon Reserve and across Lees Avenue to Brown Reserve, through Flockhart Park and across Burwood Road to Sando Park. Follow the path through Sando Park and Rosedale Park to Hampton Street. Turn left into Hampton Street and then right into Wentworth Street until the end and then turn right into Brighton Avenue.

After crossing Brighton Avenue the cycleway continues through Croydon Park and Lees Park and then along behind Canterbury Park Racecourse to emerge for a short on-road section along Charles Street, Canterbury. The cycleway may be rejoined at the Tasker Park footbridge and continue along the northern side of the Cooks River passing beneath Canterbury Road. There is no passing or overtaking room beneath Canterbury Road and this short section can only be traversed single file. Continue along the path through Ewen Park to the Lang Road pedestrian/cycle bridge. Turn right and cross over the Cooks River into Lang Road and then proceed across Wardell Road into Beaman Park. Follow the path along the southern side of the river to Illawarra Road, Undercliffe. Cross Illawarra Road and there is a choice of two routes. The first route is to follow the path on the southern side through Wanstead Avenue Reserve and Gough Whitlam Park to Bayview Avenue; then cross Bayview Avenue and turn left and then cross Unwins Bridge via the path and turn right into the Tempe railway station car park. The alternate route is to cross the bridge at Illawarra Road and follow the path on the northern side to Tempe railway station. Both paths rejoin in the car park and go under the railway line into Kendrick Park, Tempe.

The cycleway continues east to the Princes Highway (A36), where cyclists are able to head south along a bridge over the river, through Cahill Park, along the western side of Marsh Street, under the M5 East motorway and southeast along West Botany Street, Banksia before heading east along Bestic Street and reaching its southeastern terminus at Botany Bay in Kyeemagh.

== See also ==
- Bike paths in Sydney
- Cycling in New South Wales
- Cycling in Sydney
