= Bike paths in Sydney =

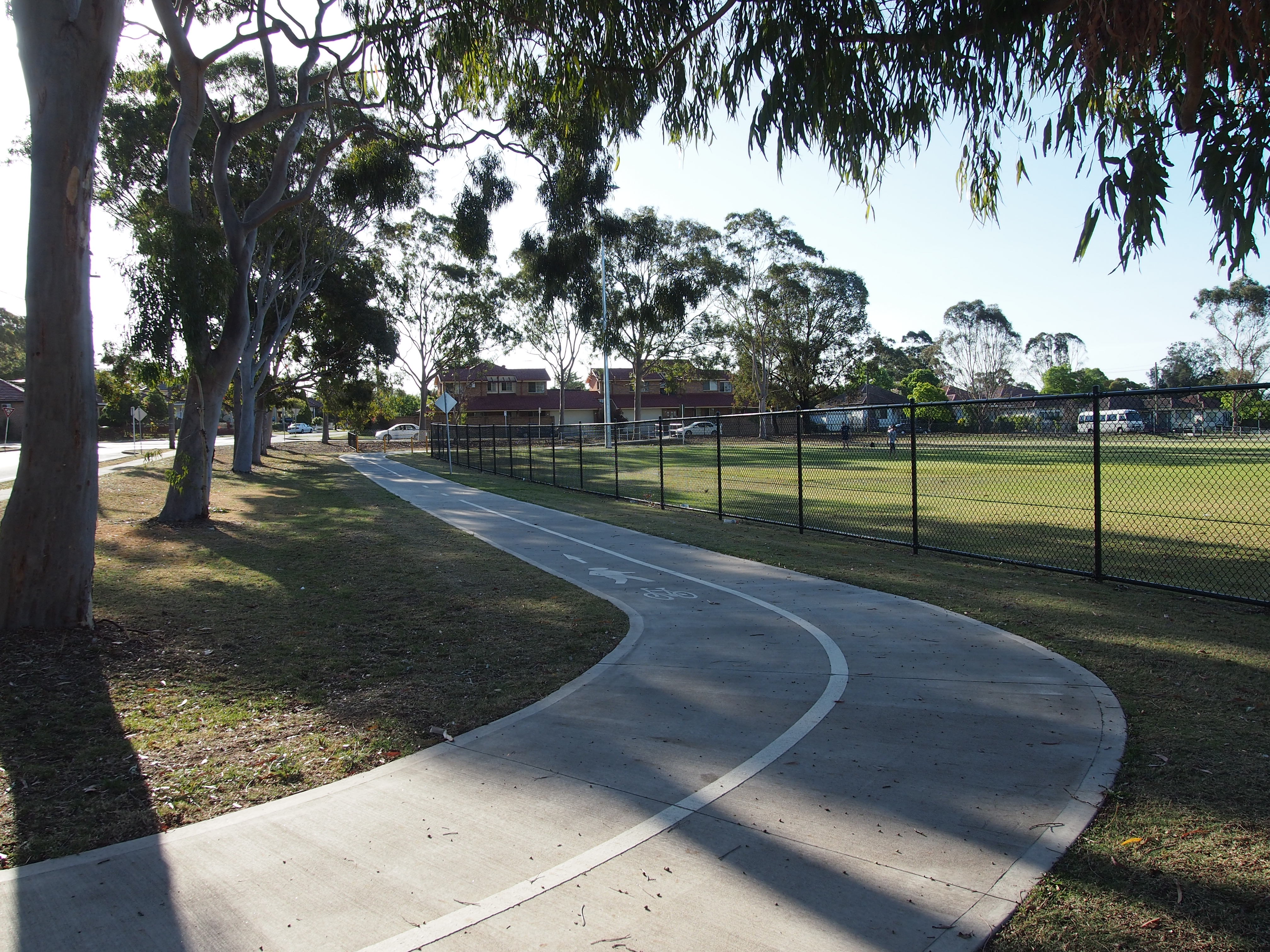
A bike path in the suburb of Birrong

Bike paths in Sydney, New South Wales, Australia are cycling infrastructure that allows people riding bikes to cycle safely for Commuting, transportation, recreation or sport.

Path types vary widely, with the majority either shared cycle and pedestrian paths or on road paths, and a small number of separated cycleways. In 2009 The Sydney Morning Herald reported that "Sydney's cycleways are not so much an organised network as a fragmented collection of winding paths and half-finished ideas."

Safe infrastructure in Sydney has historically been fragmented, due to the view of planners that cycling is a "pleasant pastime" rather than a practical form of travel. While it has historically been hostile for cycling, with the construction of significant amounts of new infrastructure Sydney is "increasingly becoming a cycling city".

In July 2020, in response to the COVID-19 pandemic, two pop up cycleways were complete in the City of Sydney. These are part of Transport for NSW's COVID Safe Travel Plan with about 20 km of cycleways being designated in Randwick, Parramatta and Sydney CBD.

Thousands of cyclist ride to or from Sydney central business district on an average day, via the Sydney Harbour Bridge, Anzac Bridge, Anzac Parade cycleways and other routes.

Transport for NSW publish a cycleway finder map of cycling routes. OpenStreetMap has detailed coverage of cycleways in Sydney.

== Sydney cycleways network ==
While there are many unnamed segments of cycleway in Sydney, there are a number of named bike paths in Sydney. These include The Bay Run, Cooks River cycleway, The Goods Line, Liverpool-Parramatta T-way, Parramatta Valley cycleway, Parramatta to Liverpool Rail Trail cycleway, Prospect Creek cycleway, Windsor Road cycleway, Sutherland to Cronulla active transport link, Louise Sauvage Pathway, and Western Sydney Parklands–Canal Reserve cycleway. A number of cycle paths parallel freeways, such as the Gore Hill and Epping Road cycleways, M2 cycleway, M4 cycleway, M5 cycleway, and M7 cycleway.

The City of Sydney is progressively building an increasing network of 220 kilometres (140 mi) separated cycleways, shared paths and other infrastructure in and adjacent to the central business district.

The council lists the following popular rides:

- Sydney Foreshore Loop – a 13-kilometre-long (8.1 mi) loop circuit linking Balmain, Glebe, Pyrmont, Dawes Point and Circular Quay
- Markets Circuit – a 13-kilometre-long (8.1 mi) ride linking The Rocks, Haymarket, Glebe, Darlington, Surry Hills and Paddington
- Quirky Sydney Ride – a 13-kilometre-long (8.1 mi) ride linking Eveleigh, Newtown, Marrickville and St Peters
- Sporting Sights Ride – a loop circuit from Sydney Football Stadium, Centennial Park and Moore Park
- Parks and Gardens Circuit #1 – a 13-kilometre-long (8.1 mi) ride linking the Royal Botanic Gardens with Victoria Park via Martin Place, Surry Hills, Darling Harbour, Pyrmont and Wentworth Park
- Parks and Gardens Circuit #2 – linking Prince Alfred Park with Victoria Park
- Inner-East Art Ride – an 8.5-kilometre-long (5.3 mi) ride including Waterloo, Surry Hills, The Domain and Mrs Macquarie's Chair
- Three Creeks Ride – a 6.7-kilometre-long (4.2 mi) loop circuit from Glebe, Annandale, Camperdown and Orphan School Creek
- Bay Run and Hawthorne Canal Ride – an 8.8-kilometre-long (5.5 mi) loop circuit including Robson Park, Hawthorne Canal Reserve, Leichhardt Park, King George Park, and Brett Park
- Two Ducks Family Ride – a 6.5-kilometre-long (4.0 mi) ride from Sydney Park to Moore Park via Alexandria Park

== Bike paths along freeways and tollways ==
A number of freeways and tollways have been constructed with dedicated separate bicycle paths built alongside.

== Bike paths across major bridges ==
Sydney is divided geographically by Port Jackson, Middle Harbour and the Parramatta River, Botany Bay and the Georges River and Broken Bay and the Hawkesbury River and Nepean River. These natural barriers mean that travelling by bike around Sydney requires use of the many bridges. The accessibility of bike paths across bridges is variable as set out in this section.

=== Pyrmont Bridge ===
The Pyrmont Bridge is a shared cycle and pedestrian zone, with signs indicating a maximum speed of 10 kilometres per hour (6.2 mph). At its eastern end, the bridge connects via the Western Distributor to the King Street separated cycleway and the Sussex Street cycle path. At its western end in Pyrmont, it connects towards Anzac Bridge via the Union Street separated cycleway and on road cycle routes along Miller Street and Saunders Street. In 2015, around 1,600 cyclists used the Union Street cycleway on an average weekday.

=== Anzac Bridge ===
The Anzac Bridge has a shared cycle and pedestrian path on its northern side. Between 1,300 and 2,000 cyclists used the Anzac Bridge on an average weekday in the 12 months to February 2014.

At the eastern (Pyrmont) end there is a spiral ramp that begins at the corner of Saunders Street and Quarry Master Drive. To the east Anzac Bridge is linked to Pyrmont Bridge by an on road cycle route (low to medium traffic) on Saunders Street and Miller Street and the Union Street separated cycleway.

At the western (Rozelle) end Anzac Bridge is linked to the Iron Cove Bridge by Victoria Road; to Rozelle and Blackwattle Bays via the Beatrice Bush Bridge; and to Lilyfield Road via a footbridge over Victoria Road. The footbridge is narrow and includes a tight corner at each end, 180° on the eastern end and 90° on the western end. An alternative to the footbridge is to use Beatrice Bush Bridge and cross the Crescent at the traffic lights.

=== Iron Cove Bridge ===
The Iron Cove Bridge consists of two bridges. The 1955 bridge has a narrow shared pedestrian and cycle path on the eastern side of the bridge. Between 200 and 300 cyclists used the 1955 bridge on an average weekday in the 12 months to February 2014.

The 2011 duplicate bridge has a 4.3 metres (14.3 feet) wide shared pedestrian and cycle path on the western side of the bridge. Between 350 and 600 cyclists used the 2011 duplicate bridge on an average weekday in the 8 months to October 2013.

At the southern (Balmain) end the Iron Cove Bridge is linked to the Anzac Bridge by Victoria Road; and to King George Park and the Bay Run by a cycle path on the western side and by an underpass from the eastern side via Terry Street and Warayama Place. Alternatively, cross Victoria Road at Terry Street or Wellington Street.

At the northern (Drummoyne) end the Iron Cove Bridge is linked to the Gladesville Bridge by Renwick Street, Wrights Road, Drummoyne Avenue and Cambridge Road from the eastern side; to Henley Marine Drive and the Bay Run by a ramp on the western side; and to Victoria Road and Day Street by a ramp on the western side.

=== Gladesville Bridge ===
The Gladesville Bridge has a narrow shared cycle and pedestrian path on its eastern side. Do not attempt to cycle on the western side as the path is too narrow for a bike.

On the southern (Drummoyne) end the connection can be confusing as cyclists are prohibited from using 50m of the path alongside Victoria Road between Wolsley Street and Cambridge Road. The designated route from the Iron Cover Bridge is via Renwick Street, Wrights Road, Drummoyne Avenue and Cambridge Road. The Canada Bay Bike Plan 2005 proposed to widen the path between Cambridge Road and Wolseley Street and stated that this was one of five routes "formally included by RTA in BikePlan 2010 and have RTA funding and priorities allocated". This did not happen and was dropped by the Council in 2014.

The northern (Gladesville) end was identified in the NSW Bike Plan 2010 as one of 13 "major missing links" and that the "Huntleys Point pedestrian / cycle bridge" was a "priority metropolitan link". As of November 2021 there is no indication when, if at all, work will commence on this bridge.

The designated cycle routes connecting Drummoyne, Gladesville and Hunters Hill involve several changes in level and connections between shared paths, local roads and the Gladesville Bridge. The routes include stairs and a tunnel between the bridge and Huntleys Point Road, and connect with the Tarban Creek Bridge.

=== Ryde Bridge ===
The Ryde Bridge consists of two bridges. The eastern concrete bridge (carrying southbound traffic) has a shared cycle and pedestrian path on the eastern side.

Access to the southern (Rhodes) end is via Llewellyn Street. Access to the Meadowbank Railway Bridge is via an underpass, Leeds Street and Blaxland Road.

Access to the northern (Ryde) end is via the Loop Road. There are bike paths heading in both directions along the Parramatta River.

=== Old Meadowbank Rail Bridge ===
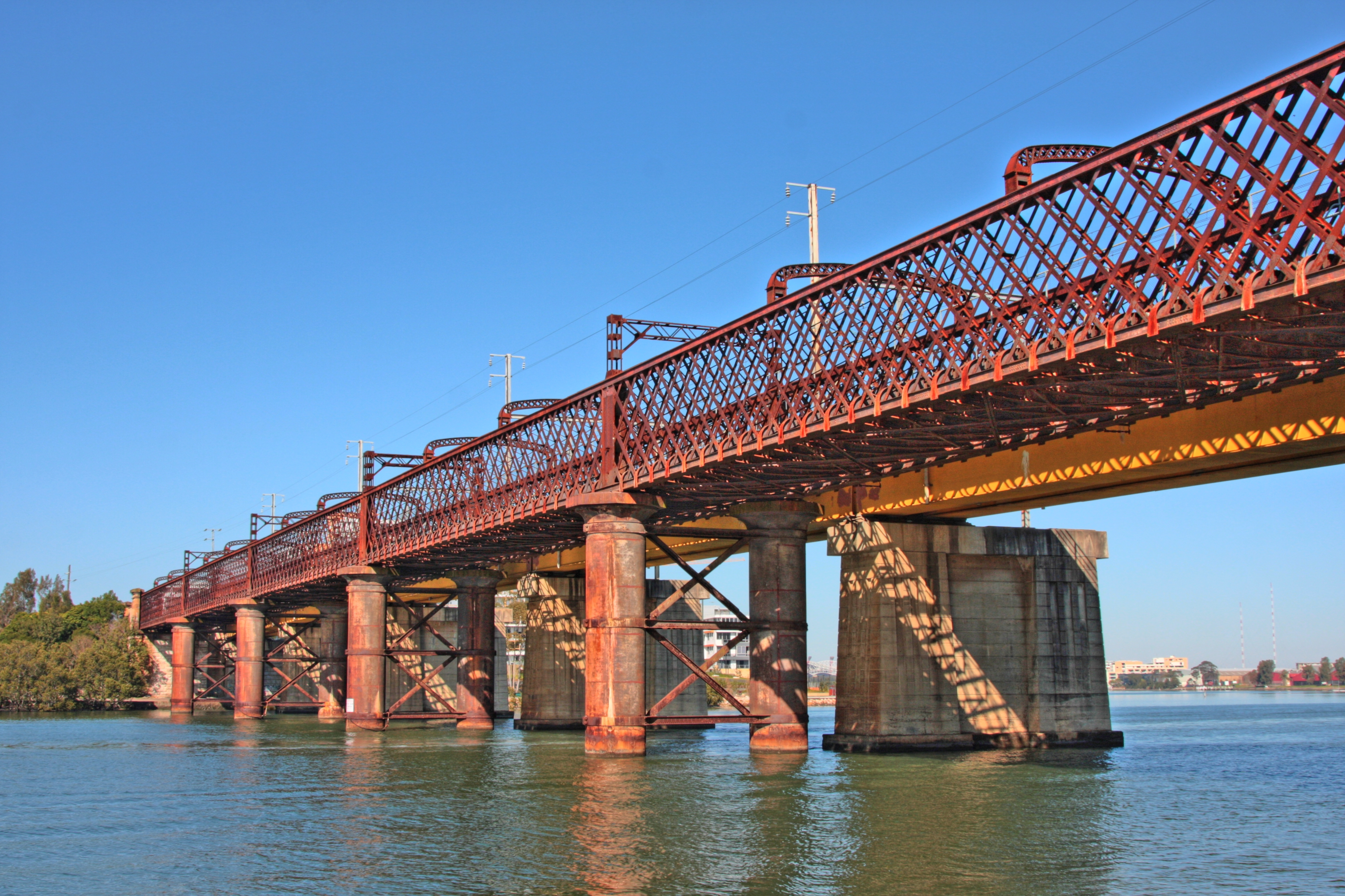
Meadowbank Railway Bridge, shared cycle and pedestrian path

The 1895 iron lattice Meadowbank Railway Bridge was replaced as the railway bridge for the Main Northern railway line by the John Whitton Bridge in 1980. In 2000 the old bridge was converted to a shared cycle and pedestrian path. Between 300 and 425 cyclists used the Old Meadowbank Rail Bridge on an average weekday in the 12 months to February 2014, with a greater number on the weekend.

Access at the southern (Rhodes) end is via Blaxland Road.

Access to the northern (Ryde) end is via Bay Drive or Bank Street. There are bike paths heading in both directions along the Parramatta River.

=== Captain Cook Bridge ===
The Captain Cook Bridge has a narrow shared cycle and pedestrian path in both directions. Between 125 and 225 cyclists used the Captain Cook Bridge on an average weekday in the 12 months to February 2014, with a greater number on the weekend.

=== Como Rail Bridge ===
Between 150 and 300 cyclists used the Old Como railway bridge on an average weekday in the 12 months to February 2014. There is an extension to Oatley Park on the western side of Oatley.

=== Alfords Point Bridge ===
The Alfords Point Bridge has a shared path on the eastern side from Clancy Street, Padstow Heights to Fowler Road, Illawong.

=== Spit Bridge ===
Whilst more than 400 cyclists commute over the Spit Bridge every day, cyclists are not well catered for, with a choice of negotiating the narrow shared path on the western side or riding on the heavily congested road.

=== Woronora River Bridge ===
The Woronora River Bridge has a shared path located just underneath the road.

== Bike paths ==
=== Bay to Mountains Cycleway ===
This major infrastructure project was proposed as part of the 2000 Olympic Games works to link Sydney Olympic Park with the Dunc Gray Velodrome at Bankstown and the mountain bike and Sydney International Equestrian Centre at Abbotsbury. A rough figure-8 route was designed joining Olympic Park with Bass Hill, Abbotsbury, Prospect and Guildford. Works over the years have seen a large portion of the western loop of the route constructed from Bankstown Veledrome to Abbotsbury, Prospect Dam and Guildford. The part of this loop from the velodrome north to Sefton is yet to be constructed but there is a short section beside Duck River from South Granville almost to Regents Park and also a short section through Birrong. There has been little work on the eastern loop from Sefton to Auburn however a path near the M4 is completed between North Auburn and Olympic Park however a large loop around Olympic Park exists joining North Strathfield to Newington.

=== Liverpool to Parramatta T-way cycleways ===
Shared paths run along the Liverpool-Parramatta T-way from Hoxton Park Road, Liverpool to Davis Road at Wetherill Park, connecting via The Horsley Drive and Wetherill Park Nature Reserve. The path rejoins the T-Way at Victoria Street to Davis Road, Wetherill Park. There are connections to Prospect Creek cyclepath, Orphan School Creek cyclepath, Clear Paddock Creek cyclepath. Further towards Parramatta the path runs alongside Cumberland Highway to South Wentworthville then under the M4 and beside Jones Park to emerge beside Pitt Street to the heart of the Parramatta CBD and Parramatta Park.

=== Parramatta to Liverpool Rail Trail cycleway ===
There is a 25 km (16 mi) cycle path running mostly along the route of the rail line between Parramatta railway station and Liverpool railway station. Being mostly adjacent to the railway line there are very few road crossings or traffic lights.

=== Sutherland to Cronulla active transport link ===
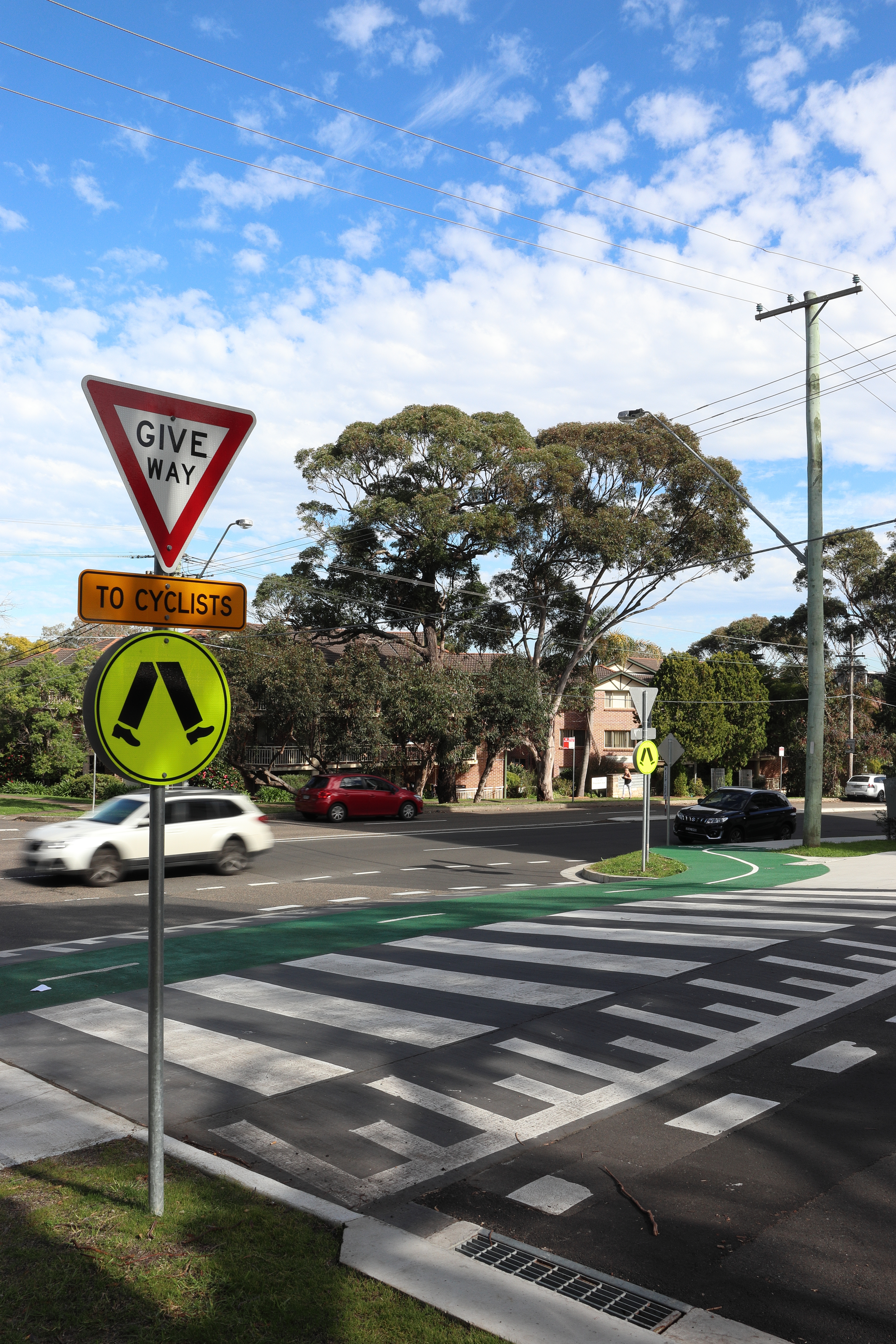
Pedestrian and cyclist crossing with associated signage in Kirrawee

A partially constructed link between Sutherland and Cronulla. Currently, the only constructed portion is between Sutherland and Kirrawee It consists in some places of shared paths, and in other locations dedicated separated cycleways and footpaths.

=== Sydney Olympic Park and Bicentennial Park ===
Sydney Olympic Park has over 35 kilometres (22 mi) of cycleways, including a children's circuit, a 5.5-kilometre (3.4 mi) Parklands Circuit, a 7.6-kilometre (4.7 mi) Olympic Circuit, a 12.5-kilometre (7.8 mi) River Heritage Circuit and the Louise Sauvage Pathway.

Much of the route is impaired by the numerous traffic light crossings, with one 4 km section from Stockland Mall to Davis Road through Wetherill Park having eight sets of traffic lights.

== Bush trails ==
Fire Trails

== Principal bicycle network ==
The Principal Bicycle Network is a proposed network of cycleway infrastructure for Sydney. It was developed by the state government in collaboration with all councils (at least 30) in Greater Sydney and Bicycle NSW. As the plans were not published, they have since attained a "rather mythical status" among the bicycle advocacy community.

The NSW government committed to delivering a Principal Bicycle Network in the 2020 Future Transport Strategy covering over 5000km of cycling infrastructure across tiers 1-3. (Note: Or in the 2018 Future Transport 2056 policy) It was intended to be a blueprint of cycleways committed to in the Transport for NSW Future Transport Strategy 2056. It included a 284km network of cycleways within 10km of the Sydney CBD.

In 2008, the City of Sydney made a submission to the Infrastructure Australia proposing the Inner Sydney Strategic Cycle Network in partnership with the NSW Department of Environment and Climate Change, Roads & Traffic Authority, and 15 adjacent councils, which was published by July 2009. In 2009, AECOM prepared the Inner Sydney Regional Bicycle Network Implementation Strategy The work commenced by the City of Sydney in 2009, which came to involve 14 other councils (or 15), became part of TfNSW's 2018 Future Transport Strategy 2056, and involved the identification of specific routes to be funded by TfNSW. By 2018, Infrastructure Australia had listed the Inner Sydney Regional Bike Network on the National Infrastructure Priority List, and Transport for NSW were developing a bike network plan for Parramatta. Work on the PBN began in November 2018. The draft plan was completed by November 2019 but was never published. By September 2021, it had been entirely abandoned and was subsequently removed from the Infrastructure Australia priority list.

Cate Faehrmann called for the government to release the PBN in June 2020. On 3 June 2020, the Office of the Minister for Transport and Roads proactively released a draft map to Cate Faehrmann under the GIPA act. The map was current as of May 2020. (Note: 4 May 2020) That evening, Cate Faehrmann moved a motion to release details about the map under Standing Order 52. The motion was not opposed by the government, and it was supported by the opposition. John Graham commended Cate Faehrmann and stated it would be very helpful to any discussion on implementing the long term plan for Sydney if the plan was produced. One box of privileged and two boxes of unprivileged documents were received 24 June 2020. (Note: Transport for NSW applied for privilege on 15 documents. (Note: Under SO52(5) at the time.) 24 non-privileged spreadsheets (Note: One version of the Non-privileged - Excel document states 25 items but has 24 rows - Count of 21 is skipped.) and 638 non-privileged documents were released as non-privileged and are accessible to the public.)

As of April 2020, the plan was scheduled to be delivered by 2056. The Committee for Sydney called for it to be accelerated to be delivered in 3 years. The August 2020 South East Sydney Transport Strategy (Note: Guided by Future Transport 2056) included delivery of the PBN within South East Sydney. and included a map of The Proposed Principal Bicycle Network by 2056 for South East Sydney.

In September 2021, cycling representatives told Alex Greenwich that Transport for NSW had withdrawn the Principal Bicycle Network.

In August 2026, Bicycle NSW released the GIPA request Faehrmann receivedand the map contained within it. Bicycle NSW called on the government to release the 2020 PBN map in a machine-readable format.

== See also ==
- Cycling in New South Wales
- Cycling in Sydney
- Cycling in Australia
