= Mount Tutu Eco-Sanctuary =

Coordinates: 37.839°S 176.244°E

Mount Tutu Eco-Sanctuary in Bay of Plenty, North Island, New Zealand, between Tauranga and Rotorua, is a Mainland Island Sanctuary, protected by the Queen Elizabeth II National Trust Act 1977 since 1993. The sanctuary exists to protect and educate on New Zealand's natural flora and fauna, with conservation programmes to mitigate the effects of introduced predators on New Zealand's native wildlife.

The indigenous wildlife at the sanctuary include the bellbird, tūī, kererū (wood pigeon), pīwakawaka (fantail), ruru (morepork), pūkeko, and shining cuckoo, skinks and geckos, giant wētā, and New Zealand glow worm (Arachnocampa luminosa).
