= Cycling in Australia =

Cycling in Australia is a common form of transport, recreation and sport. Many Australians ride regularly because it improves their health and is a convenient and fast way to get to their destination.

In 2020, 1.7 million bicycles were sold in Australia. As of 2023, around 15% of Australians rode a bicycle (including e-bicycles) in the previous week and 36.7% over the previous year. Australians no longer only ride for recreation - bicycle commuting is on the rise around Australia, with an increase in every state where counts took place. It is estimated that 20% of shared bike trips are replacing car travel. Across Australia, over one-third of riders used a bike for transport and various governments around Australia are encouraging more people to start riding. The New South Wales Government wants walking and bike riding to be the preferred way to make short trips and a viable, safe and efficient option for longer trips, and the Department of Transport (Victoria) recognises that active travel is the preferred choice for short trips.

Across Australia, 19% of people are cautious or confident bike riders. A further 42% of people are interested - do not currently ride but would like to. In NSW, 48% of people are "interested" in cycling but are "concerned" about safety. Cycling is a safer method of transport than driving. Cycling is less popular in Australia than in Europe, however cyclists make up one in forty road deaths and one in seven serious injuries.

In areas with more investment in safe cycling infrastructure, cycling is becoming a mainstream mode of transport. In the City of Sydney, over one quarter of residents surveyed cycled within the last month. Twice-yearly counts at 68 intersections show a 15% increase in people riding year-on-year and a 168% increase since 2010. From 2019 to April 2024, there were more than 2.9 million share bike trips taken in the City of Sydney. In 2024, there were over 1.94 million shared bike trips in the City of Sydney area.

== History ==
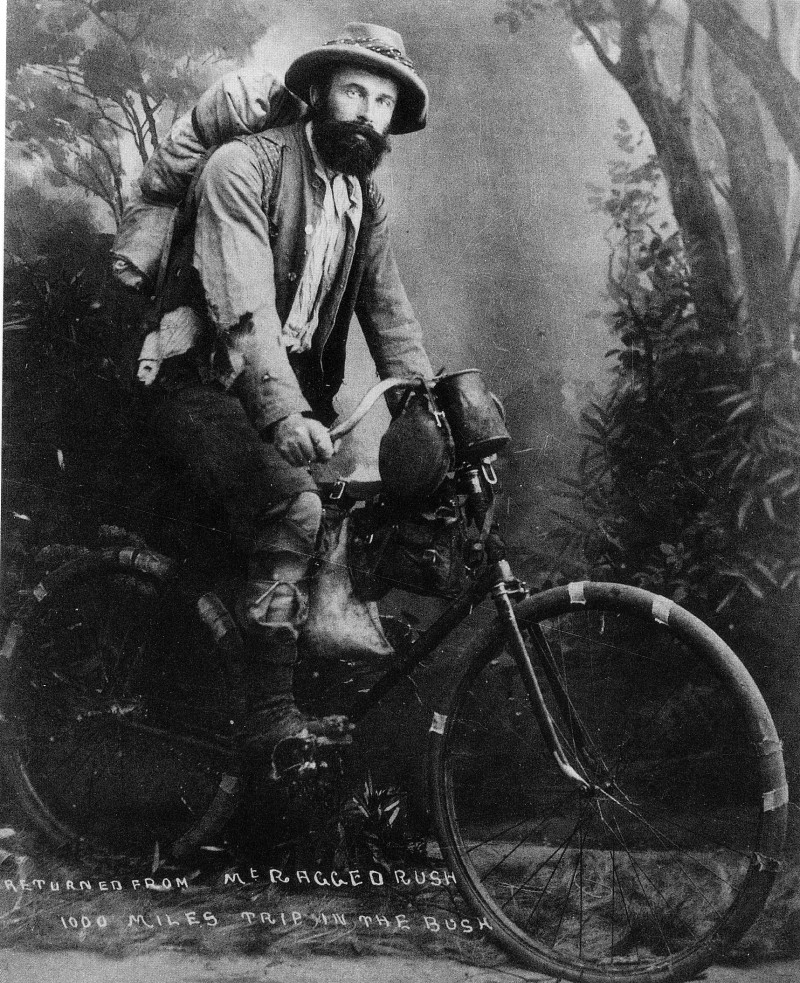
A goldminer pictured after a 1000-mile (1,600-kilometre) round trip to the Mt Rugged Gold Rush in 1895

Bicycles arrived in Australia in 1860s, and the sport was quickly adopted with touring and racing clubs forming.

By the 1890s cycling was accessible to the middle class, and long-distance cycle travelling was a fact of life for many sheep shearers and other agricultural labourers with migratory work. The bicycle and swag travelled much of Australia on dusty dirt tracks, long before the automobile made its appearance. In the main, however, long-distance cycling was a sport of endurance or was done out of necessity.

At the same time, racing became quite popular with the Austral Wheel Race beginning in 1887, and leading to the development of the Malvern Star cycling brand. The first Melbourne to Warrnambool Classic, a long-distance event, was held in October 1895, eight years before the first Tour de France.

Between 1990 and 1992 Australia become the first country to make wearing helmets compulsory, after a number of studies indicated that they reduced head injuries. After their introduction, the overall number of riders decreased, mostly due to a decline in children riding to school. This has not conclusively shown to be due to mandatory helmet laws and may have followed pre-existing trends dating from the 1970s.

== Laws ==
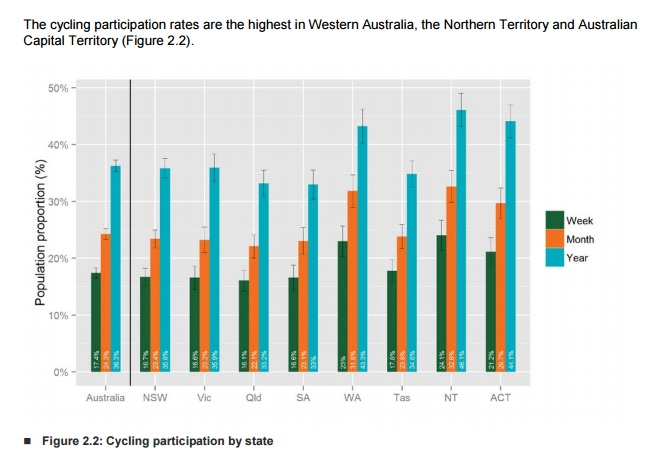
Cycling participation in Australia in 2015

Cyclists in every state are required to follow normal road rules, including using traffic lights correctly and observing give way and stop signs while riding on the road.

Cyclists in every state must wear helmets while in motion. In all states, cyclists must ride as close as practicable to the left side of the road when on a single lane road, however, cyclists may use any lane and does not have to keep to the left on a multi-lane road. All states require only one passenger per bicycle unless the bicycle is designed otherwise.

Bike users in Western Australia and Tasmania must use both hand signals, while in Victoria, Queensland, New South Wales, and Northern Territory cyclists must signal when turning right but it's not compulsory when turning left.

Cyclist must have at least one hand on handle bars in Western Australia, Northern Territory and Queensland.

Cyclist may ride on standard footpaths in Western Australia, Northern Territory, South Australia and Australian Capital Territory. In Victoria cyclists can only ride on a footpath if they're under the age of 13 or supervising a child under 13, or have a disability which restrains them from being able to ride on the road. In New South Wales cyclists can only ride on a footpath if they're under the age of 16 or supervising a child under 16. In Queensland cyclists can ride on any path as long as there isn't a sign stating otherwise.

Cyclists may ride in groups or bunches in all Australia States and territories, riding two abreast riders must be no more than 1.5 meters apart.

Cyclists across Australia must follow the same rules as motor vehicle drivers in regards to using mobile phones and consuming alcohol.

Cyclist also need to use a bike light when riding at night in Western Australia, Tasmania, Northern Territory, South Australia and Queensland.

== Types of cycling ==
=== Recreational cycling ===
Pearson's cyclist's and traveller's distinct road map of New South Wales, c. 1917,

Many Australians ride a bike for recreation or commuting. In 2023, 15% of Australians cycled at least weekly, 24% at least monthly and 37% at least yearly. Of the Australians who had cycled in the past month, 81% had cycled for recreation.

In 2024, there were 4.6 million trips, 42 million nights, and $6.0 billion in spend attributed to trips involving a cycling activity.

The National Cycling Strategy was tasked with doubling the number of people cycling from 2011 to 2016, which was not achieved. Demographic changes, and decreasing numbers of riders within capital cities accounted for most of the decrease. Some of the decrease within NSW has been blamed on increased cycling fines implemented in 2016.

The NCS has found that cycling was the most common in Western Australia, the Northern Territory and Australian Capital Territory during 2015. Victoria and Queensland have decreased in participation between 2011 and 2015.

Doubling the number of bike users has the potential to increase the safety for all riders by helping to make drivers more aware of bicycles on the road, and adding pressure to those who already cycle to obey the road rules.

=== Cycling as a sport ===
Australia hosts the Tour Down Under in January of every year; it is the first UCI World Tour event on the annual cycling calendar, and the only UCI World Tour in the southern hemisphere. Australians place strongly in cycling at the Olympic Games, UCI World Championships and other international events.

Australia has hosted the UCI Road World Championships, UCI Track Cycling World Championships and UCI Mountain Bike & Trials World Championships. Most state capitals have an indoor velodrome.

== Funding ==
Spending on active transport (walking and cycling) "pales in comparison" to funding on other modes of transport in Australia.

Australia spends $714 per person on roads every year, and 90 cents goes to walking, wheeling and cycling. Active transport budgets in NSW and Queensland make up less than 1% of their transport budgets.

The United Nations recommends nations spend 20% of their transport budgets on walking and cycling infrastructure. The Australia Institute has recommended that governments increase active transport funding to at least 10% of spending on road infrastructure. Bicycle advocacy organisations have recommended spending to be at least 10% at a federal level.

In NSW, the funding for active transport is approximately 0.2% of the total transport spend. The NSW Government "Support in principle" funding alignment with the United Nations recommendation. The NSW government has estimated every kilometre cycled benefits the economy by $4.10.

On average in Queensland, every $1 invested in cycling infrastructure returns $5 in benefits.

== Safety ==
In Australia, motorists are at fault in over three quarters of reported collisions between motorists and cyclists.

=== Fatality data ===
In Australia, police report road fatalities to the State and Territory road safety authorities. The Bureau of Infrastructure, Transport and Regional Economics (BITRE) then catalogues this data in the Australian Road Deaths Database (ARDD).

Cycling Fatalities in Australia
Year	NSW	VIC	QLD	SA	WA	TAS	NT	ACT	Australia	Source
2012	7	7	10	3	3	1	1	1	33	
2013	14	6	13	5	6	4	2	0	50	
2014	11	10	9	4	9	0	1	1	45	
2015	7	10	4	4	4	1	0	1	31	
2016	5	8	8	5	3	0	0	0	29	
2017	8	12	8	2	7	1	0	1	39	
2018	9	7	5	7	5	1	0	1	35	
2019	14	11	6	7	1	0	0	0	39	
2020	13	13	7	2	5	0	1	0	41	
2021	9	10	9	5	4	1	1	1	40	

=== Fatalities in NSW ===
The NSW Centre for Road Safety website publishes daily statistics on road fatalities, including cyclist fatalities. Monthly fatality reports and quarterly serious injury reports are also published. Locations or causes of crashes are not published in permanent datasets for up to a year.

As of November 2025, NSW Police press releases are deleted or disappear after some months, and daily NSW Centre for Road Safety reports are also removed daily. Press releases are republished by other news organisations. There have been attempts to collate press releases and daily reports to avoid inaccurate reporting.

=== E-bike injuries ===
Up to June 2026, Australian hospitalisation data captured e-bikes in the motorcycle rider group, which also includes motor scooters, mopeds, and electric or petrol bicycles.

Despite this, in October 2026 the Australian Institute of Health and Welfare published a report on trends and data limitations in injuries and deaths in the categories in which e-scooter and e-bike riders are captured. It found between 2023-24 and 2024-25, the rate of hospitalisations for drivers or riders of motor-scooters, mopeds, motorbikes and e-bikes increased from 11 to 13.1 per 100,000 population. From 2021-22 to 2024-25 this rate of motor-scooters, mopeds, motorbikes and e-bikes hospitalisations increased from 6.7 to 13.1, primarily driven by young males. The rate of ICU admission of motorbike, moped and e-bike injuries in 2024-25 was the lowest on record. ABC News claimed the report found hospitalisation rates had increased for e-bike riders. Norman Swan and Preeya Alexander made a "full-throated condemnation of these devices" and stated they are both not fans of these devices. Swan claimed rental e-bikes picked up from the beach were causing an increase in foot injuries, and called for mandatory licensing. Alexander claimed people could modify all devices. The author of the report opposed mandatory licensing.

The report did not include exposure information, however in NSW between 2017 and 2022, e-bike sales grew from 9000 in 2017 to around 200,000 by 2022.

This can be compared to 71 and 74 car occupant hospitalisations per 100,000 (for males and females respectively) in 2014-15, or 46 and 12 hospitalisations per 100,000 for pedal cycling (including pedal cyclists struck by cars). In 2024, the hospitalised injury rate across all road crashes in Australia was 157.7 per 100,000 population.

== Cycling organisations ==
=== National bodies ===
==== National sporting organisation ====
- AusCycling – the national sporting organisation recognised by the Australian Sports Commission, responsible for the administration of and promotion of the sport of cycling in Australia

==== Other national bodies ====
- Audax Australia – an organisation that promotes long-distance road cycling
- Better Streets – Australia's peak body for improving our streets
- Bicycle Network – Australia's largest cycling membership organisations (45,000 members, 2015) with offices in Victoria and Tasmania.
- Cycling and Walking Australia and New Zealand (CWANZ) – Australasian lead reference group for walking and bike riding on transport and recreation networks
- Rail Trails Australia/
- We Ride – The Australian Cycling Environmental and Health Foundation

=== State bodies ===
- Bicycle NSW
- Bicycle Queensland
- Bike SA
- West Cycle

=== Foundations ===
- Amy Gillett Foundation – a charity to promote safe cycling in Australia
- World Bicycle Relief - a global bicycle charity

== Magazines ==
- Cyclist Australia/NZ Magazine – the thrill of the ride
- Treadlie Magazine – a magazine for bike lovers
- Bicycling Australia Magazine – a cycling magazine

== Awards ==
The Australian Bicycling Achievement Awards, an initiative of the Cycling Promotion Fund, have been held annually since 2002.

== See also ==
- Australian Cyclists Party
- Bicycle helmets in Australia
- Ciombola, a bike frame company active between 1998 and 2005
- Cycling in New South Wales
- Cycling in Canberra
- Cycling in Sydney
- Cycling in Victoria
- Mountain biking in Australia

== References and further reading ==
- Cycling Promotion Fund, Bicycle Sales 2009 (PDF), Cycling Promotion Fund, archived from the original (PDF) on 23 September 2015
- NSW Government, Bicycle Information for New South Wales, NSW Government, archived from the original on 21 November 2013
