= Glowworm Tunnel =

Disused railway tunnel between Lithgow, New South Wales and Newnes, New South Wales

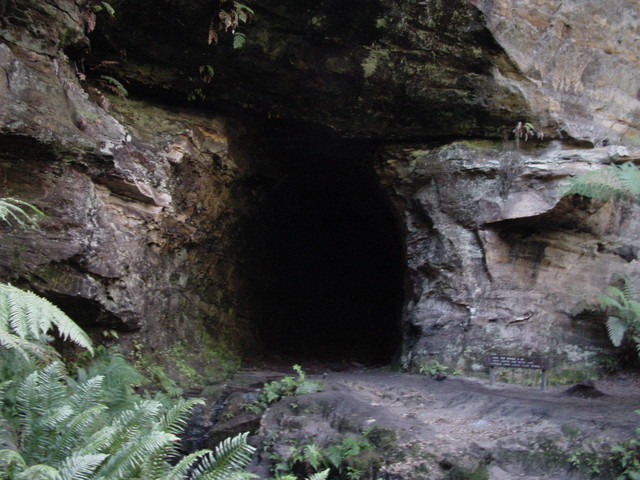
- Entrance to the tunnel
- Interactive map of Glowworm Tunnel

Overview
- Official name: Tunnel No 2
- Line: Newnes railway line
- Location: Newnes plateau
- Coordinates: 33°14′19″S 150°13′36″E

Operation
- Work began: 1906
- Constructed: June 1907
- Closed: 1932
- Operator: Commonwealth Oil Corporation
- Traffic: train

Technical
- Length: 20 chains (1,320.0 ft; 402.3 m)
- No. of tracks: single
- Track gauge: 4 ft 8 1/2 in (1,435 mm) standard gauge
- Grade: 1:25

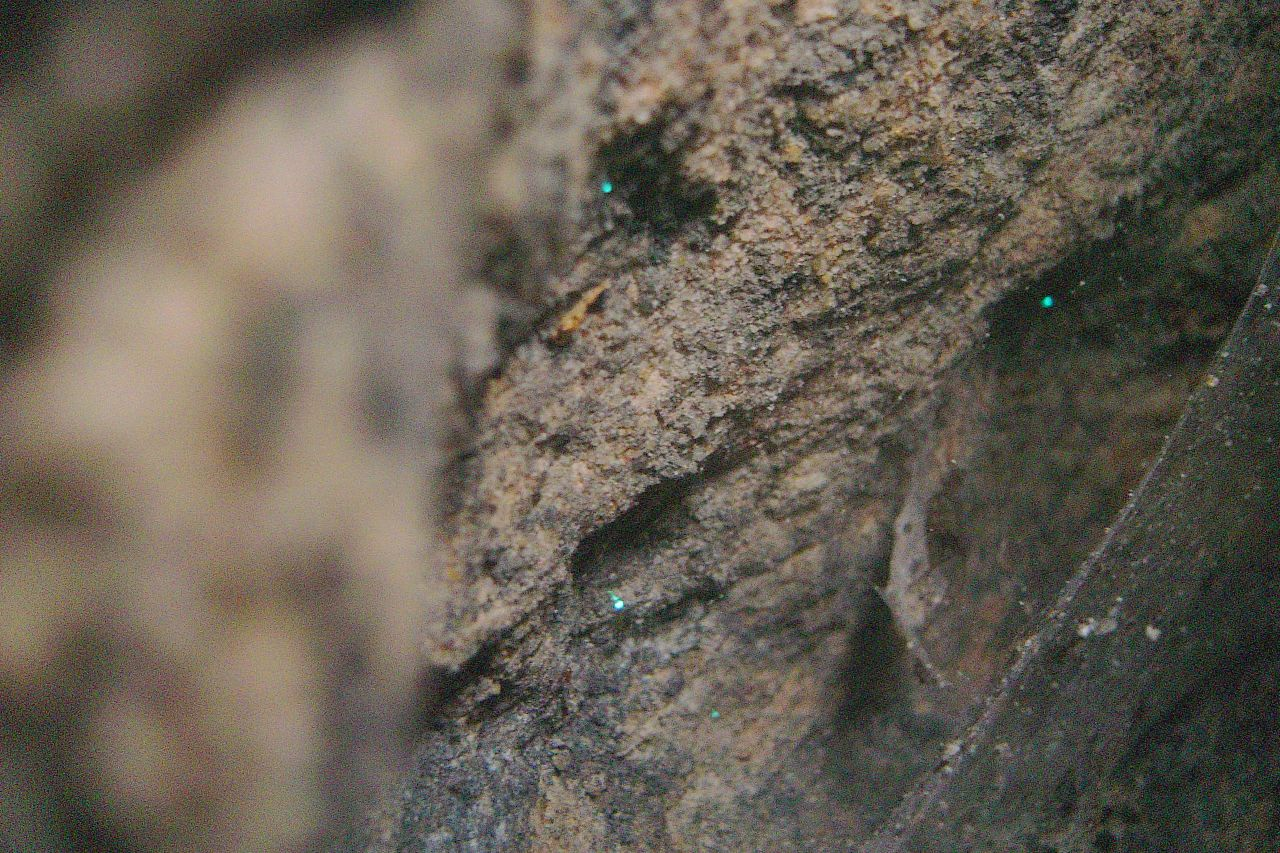
Glow worms inside the tunnel

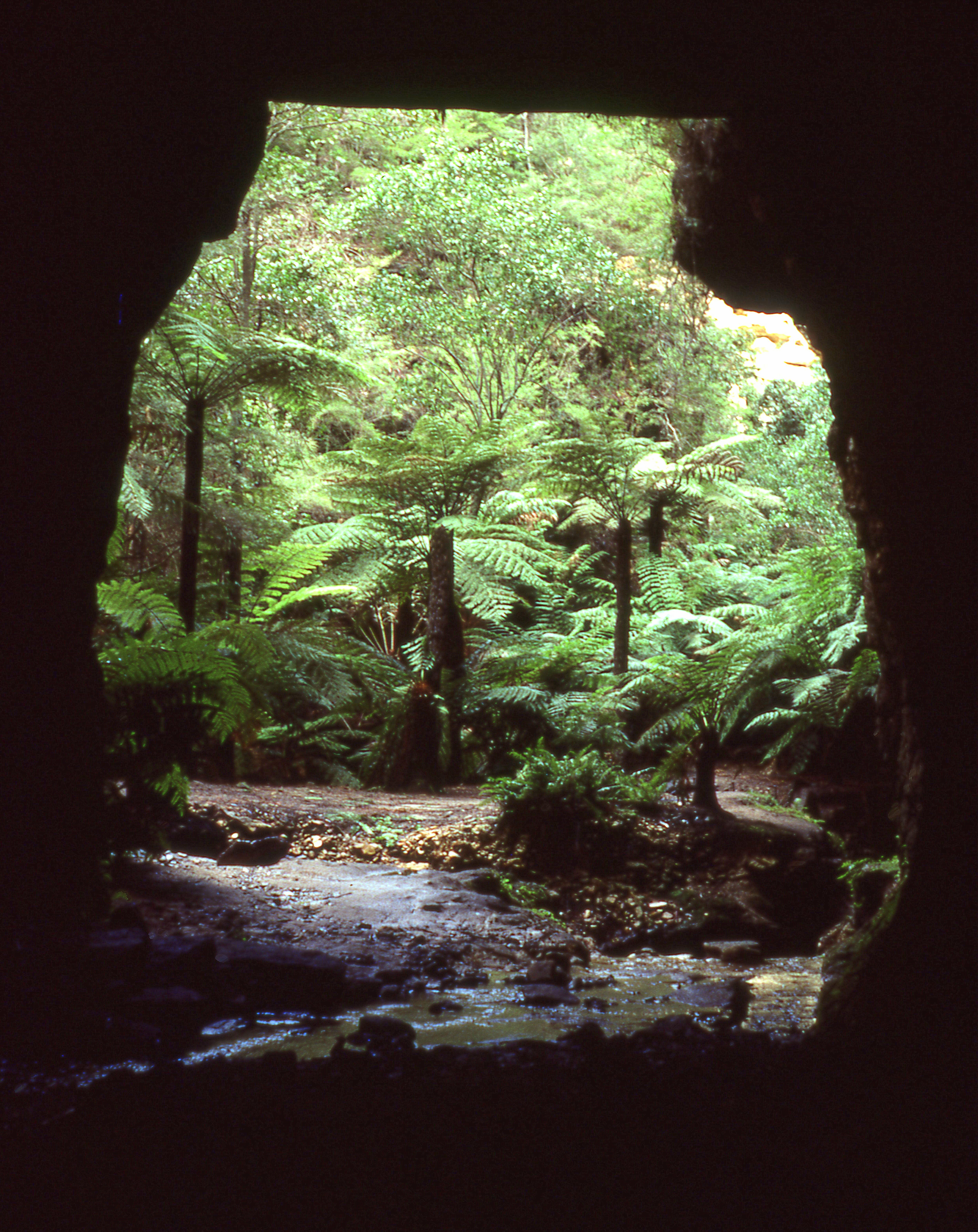
Northern end of the tunnel, seen from inside

The Glowworm Tunnel is a disused railway tunnel between Lithgow, New South Wales and Newnes, New South Wales, Australia. It is notable for its resident glow-worms, the bioluminescent larvae of Arachnocampa richardsae, a type of fungus gnat.

== Description and history ==
The 20 chains (1,320.0 ft; 402.3 m) tunnel was bored through the sandstone in 1907 as part of the Newnes railway line that served the Newnes oil shale mines that operated during the early 20th century. The railway was closed in 1932 and the rails were pulled out of the tunnel.

The tunnel is now contained within the Wollemi National Park and is a popular attraction for bushwalkers and tourists. Outside the tunnel, the area features spectacular gorges, caves and scenery. The site is maintained by the National Parks and Wildlife Service. On the south side of the tunnel, a large gap in the road prevents vehicular access. According to some sources, this gap was created deliberately to keep cars out of the tunnel, because the exhaust fumes would have killed the glow-worms. On the north side of the tunnel, a track leads to Newnes.

== Access ==
Access to the tunnel is via several routes:

- Walk or cycle in from Gardens of Stone State Conservation Area
- Drive from Lithgow via State Gully Road or Clarence via Old Bells Line of Road along Glowworm Tunnel Road, about 25 km of good unsealed road, through another former rail tunnel to the carpark, and walk 1 km to the tunnel.
- 9 km return walk: Drive to the weir over the Wolgan River 7 km before Newnes. Walk up the nearby fire trail to the railway line to the right
- 11 km walk each way: Walk along the route of the old railway line from Newnes

== See also ==
- Rail trail
