= M7 cycleway =

- Length: 40 kilometres (25 mi)
- Location: Sydney, New South Wales, Australia
- Trailheads: Prestons (south) to; Glenwood (north)
- Use: Cycling; pedestrians
- Elevation gain/loss: ▲241 metres (791 ft); ▼213 metres (699 ft)
- Highest point: 131 metres (430 ft) AHD
- Lowest point: 25 metres (82 ft) AHD
- Difficulty: Easy
- Season: All seasons

The M7 cycleway is a 40-kilometre-long (25 mi) shared use path for cyclists and pedestrians that is generally aligned with the Westlink M7 in Greater Western Sydney, New South Wales, Australia. The southern terminus of the cycleway is located adjacent to the Camden Valley Way at Prestons, while the northern terminus is located adjacent to the Old Windsor Road at Glenwood. The cycleway crosses the M4 motorway at Eastern Creek.

The cycleway was completed at a cost of $60 million.

== Cycleway use ==
In the twelve months to February 2014, between 200 and 350 cyclists used on the M7 cycleway at Glenwood and at Rooty Hill on an average weekday, with a greater number on the weekends.

== See also ==
- Bike paths in Sydney
- Cycling in New South Wales
- Cycling in Sydney
