= Carriageway =

Width of road on which a vehicle is not restricted by any physical barriers

Diagram showing different arrangements of the elements of a road

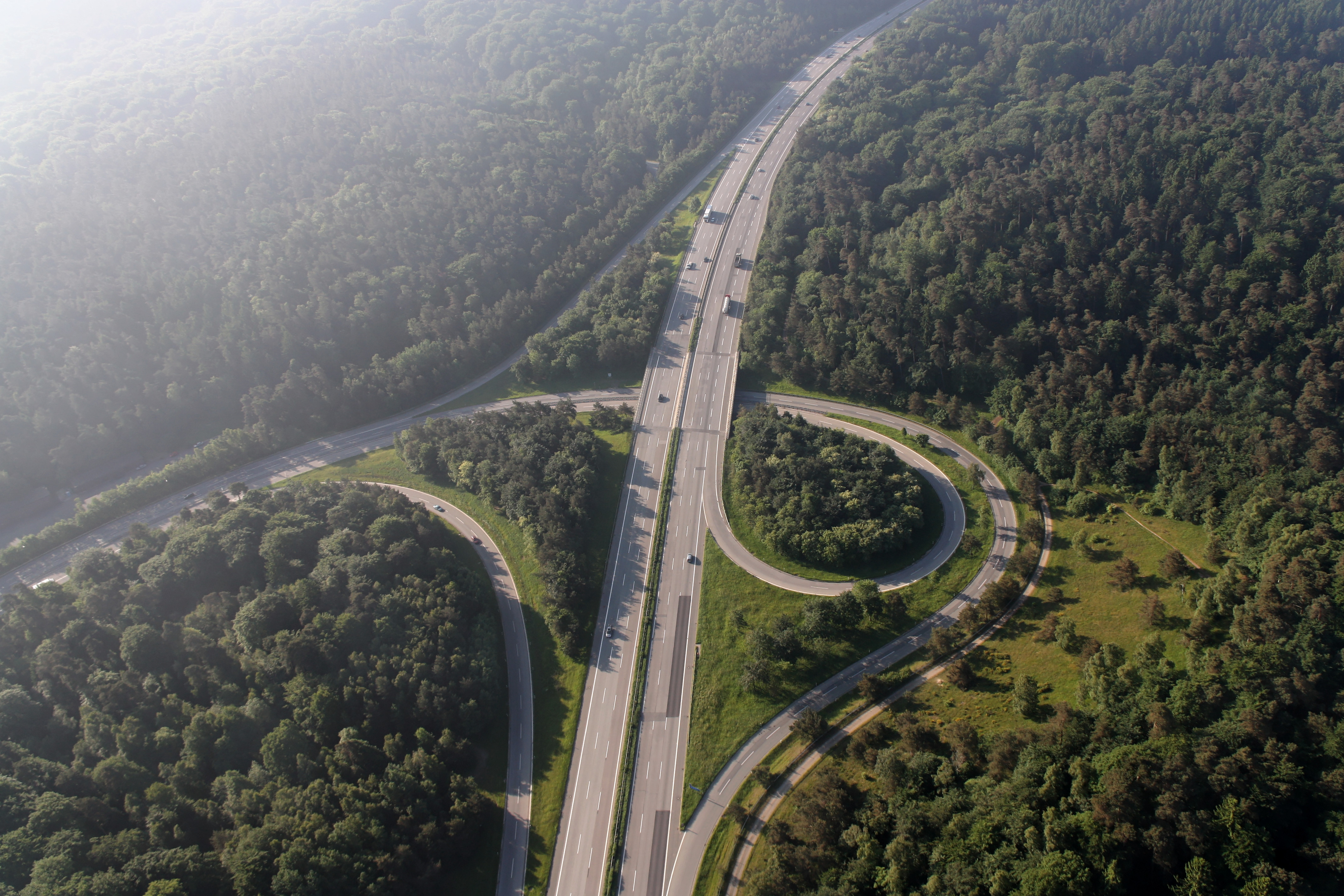
An intersection of the German A7 Autobahn near Hamburg showing slip roads as well as shoulders

A carriageway (British English) or roadway (North American English) is a width of road on which a vehicle is not restricted by any physical barriers or separation to move laterally. A carriageway generally consists of a number of traffic lanes together with any associated shoulder, but may be a sole lane in width (for example, a highway offramp).

== Description ==
A single carriageway road (North American English: undivided highway) has one carriageway with 1, 2 or more lanes together with any associated footways (North American English: sidewalk) and road verges (North American English: tree belt, parkway, or other regional variants). A dual carriageway road (North American English: divided highway) has two roadways separated by a central reservation (North American English: median). A local-express lane system (also called collector-express or collector-distributor) has more than two roadways, typically two sets of 'local lanes' or 'collector lanes' and also two sets of 'express lanes'. "Cars only" lanes may be physically separated from those open to mixed traffic including trucks and buses. The New Jersey Turnpike (I-95) in the United States, uses this design from the Pennsylvania Turnpike to its northern terminus at the George Washington Bridge in Fort Lee. High-occupancy vehicle lanes may also be physically separated from the remainder of the general traffic lanes as a distinct roadway. Some cities such as Pittsburgh, Pennsylvania, have many bus-only roadways to alleviate congestion related to public transit buses, despite its very challenging topography which severely limits the extent to which arterial roadways can be added or augmented.

== See also ==
- Chaussee
- Dual carriageway
- Frontage road / lane
- Geometric design of roads
