= Parramatta Park, New South Wales =

Park in New South Wales, Australia

Parramatta Park

- Location within Sydney
- Type: Urban Park
- Location: Pitt & Macquarie Streets, Parramatta
- Coordinates: 33°48′49″S 150°59′52″E
- Area: 85 ha (210 acres)
- Created: 1858
- Operator: Parramatta Park Trust
- Visitors: 2 million (in 2015–16)
- Open: All year
- Website: www.parrapark.com.au

Parramatta Park is a major urban park and historic site in Parramatta in Western Sydney, Australia. It was gazetted as a public park in 1858 on the site of the former Parramatta Government Domain over 99.5 hectares. It was gazetted as a National Park in 1917. The Government Domain was established around the cottage built for Arthur Phillip, which was replaced by the Government House that is still the centrepiece of the park today. Old Government House and Domain form part of the World Heritage Listed item "Australian Convict Sites", together with ten other Australian sites with a significant association with convict transportation which together represent "the best surviving examples of large-scale convict transportation and the colonial expansion of European powers through the presence and labour of convicts".

== History ==
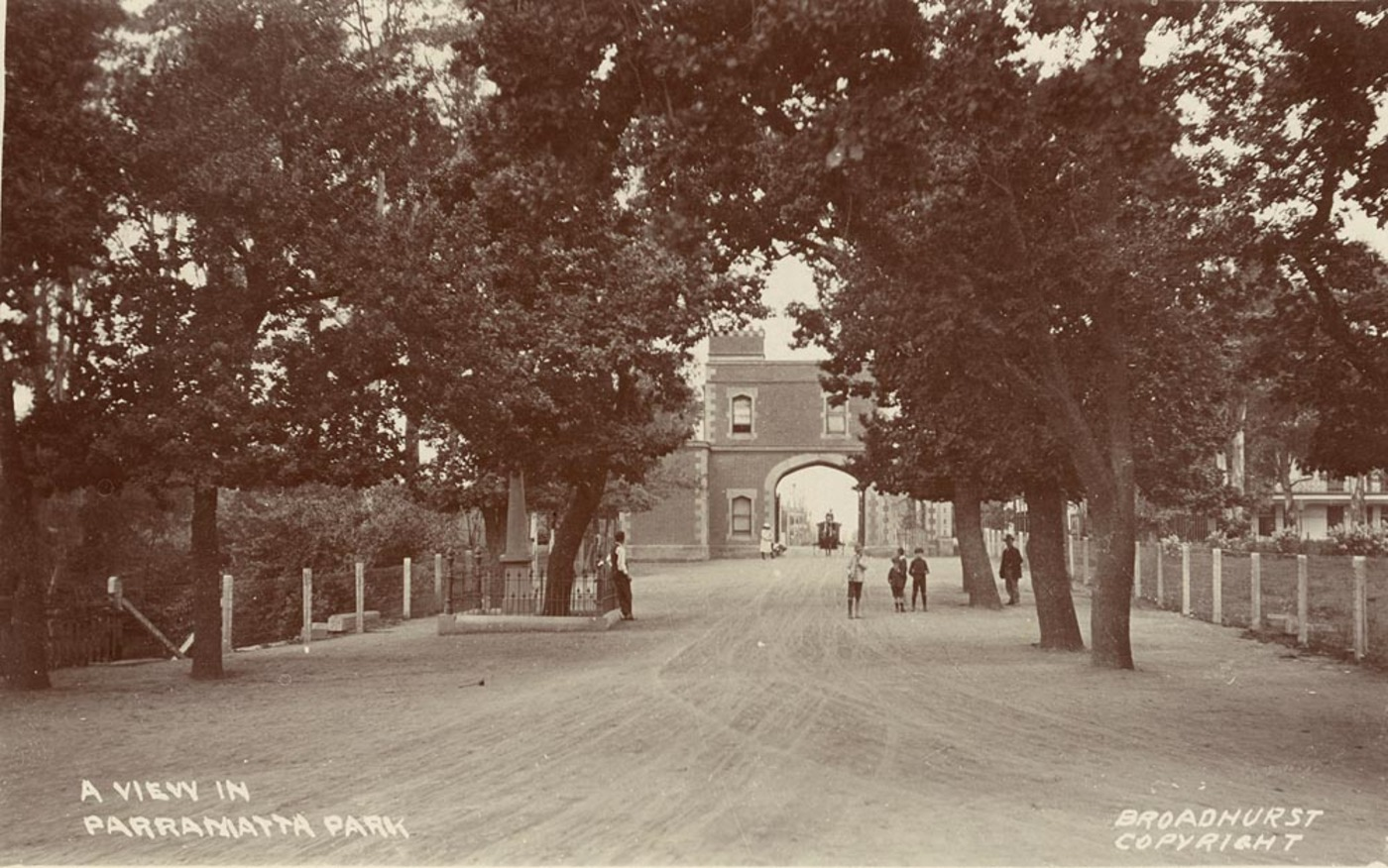
View towards George Street Gatehouse from inside Parramatta Park, c.1900-1927

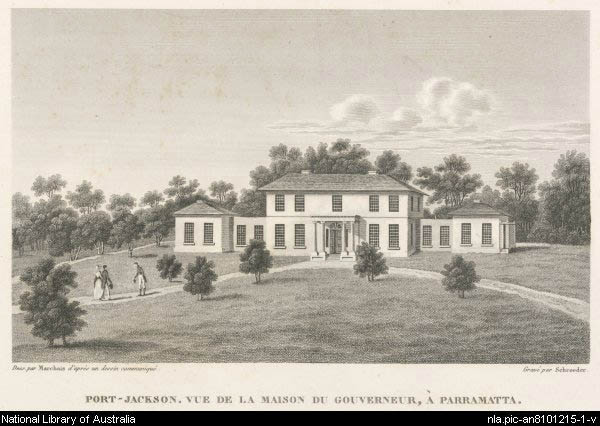
Government House at Parramatta in 1819

The park is a part of the territory of the Darug people, who called it Burramatta, and has remnants of the Cumberland Plain Woodland. It is historically and archaeologically significant and has been used for recreational purposes throughout the 19th and the 20th century. The remains of aboriginal occupation can be seen within the park and various artifacts of the era have been retrieved from the vast green space.

Between 1859 and 1889, large parts of the Government Domain were subdivided into the suburbs of Westmead and Northmead.

In 1860 the extension of the Main Western railway line divided the park and necessitated the demolition of Governor Macquarie's stables. In 1913 some of the park was annexed for the construction of Parramatta High School. In 1981, eight hectares was transferred to the Parramatta Stadium Trust.

In the early 1950s motor racing was held on the roads running through the park. After a failed attempt in 1938, in 1951 an agreement was reached between the Parramatta Park Trust and the Australian Sporting Car Club to build two circuits in the park; a full 3.2 kilometres (2 mi) Grand Prix circuit, and a shorter 1.6 kilometres (1 mi) club circuit. Initially the agreement was for four meetings per year, with the first on 28 January 1952, but in the end five were held that year, and in the final year of racing 12 were held in 1955. An attempt to revive the circuit failed in 1958 due to an intervention by the Commissioner of Police over safety concerns.

In June 1954, the Steam Tram & Railway Preservation Society laid a short section of railway track. Its depot was destroyed by an arson attack in June 1993, and the track was lifted in December 1998.

The present parklands are 85 hectares in size, straddling the Parramatta River on the western edge of the Parramatta central business district. Old Government House, sits within the park.

The park is administered by the Parramatta Park Trust pursuant to the Parramatta Park Trust Act 2001.

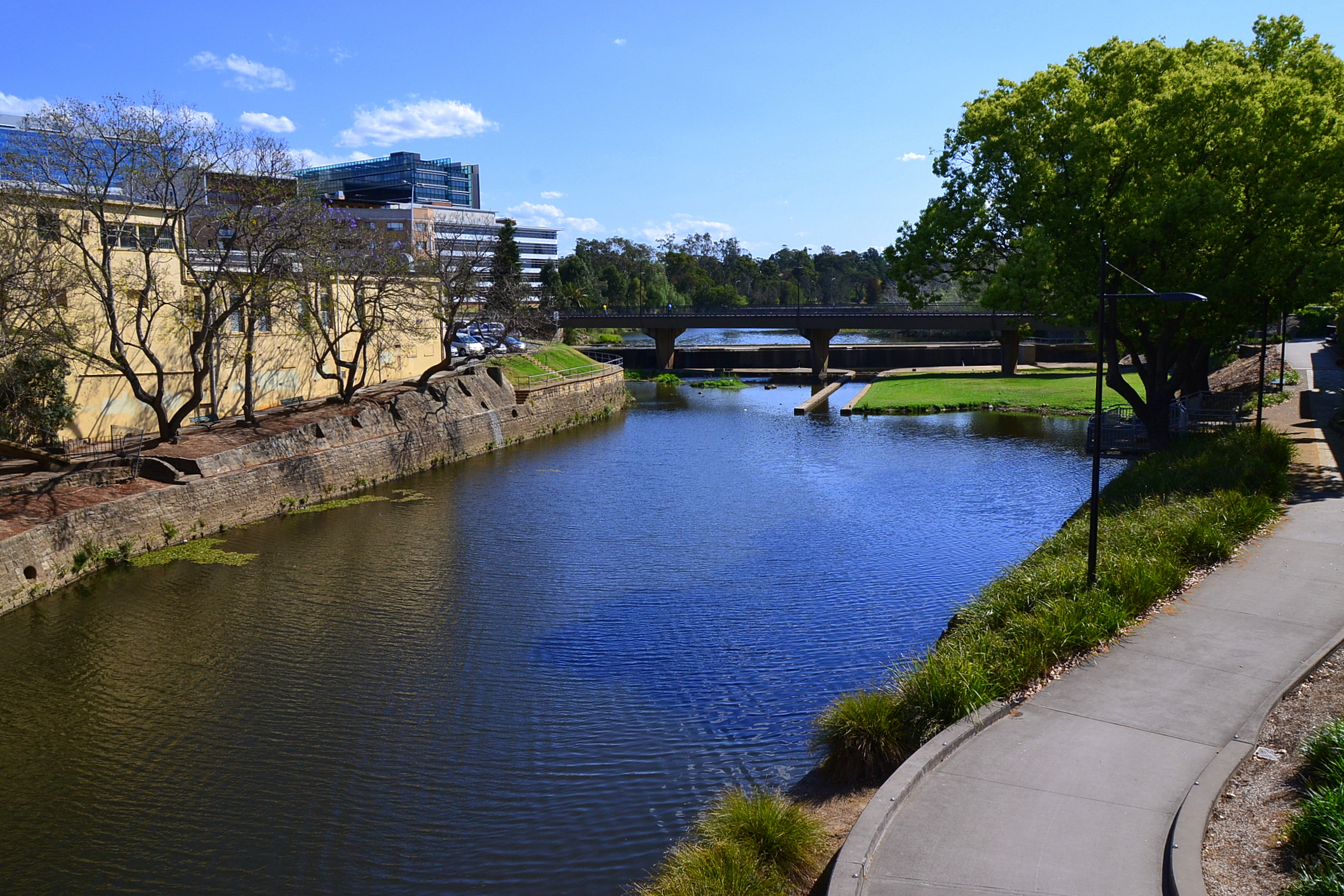
Parramatta River

== Features ==
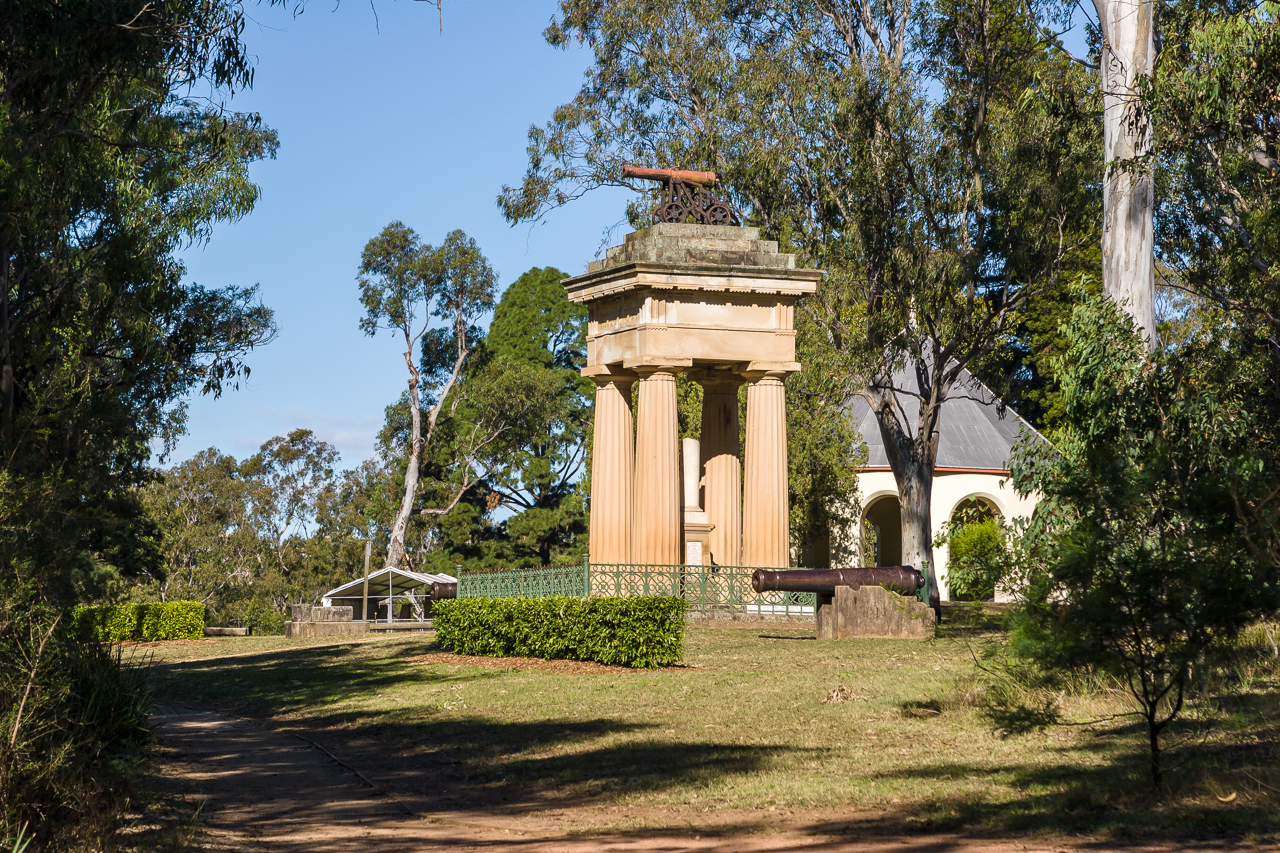
The Boer War Memorial and Governor Brisbane's Bath House

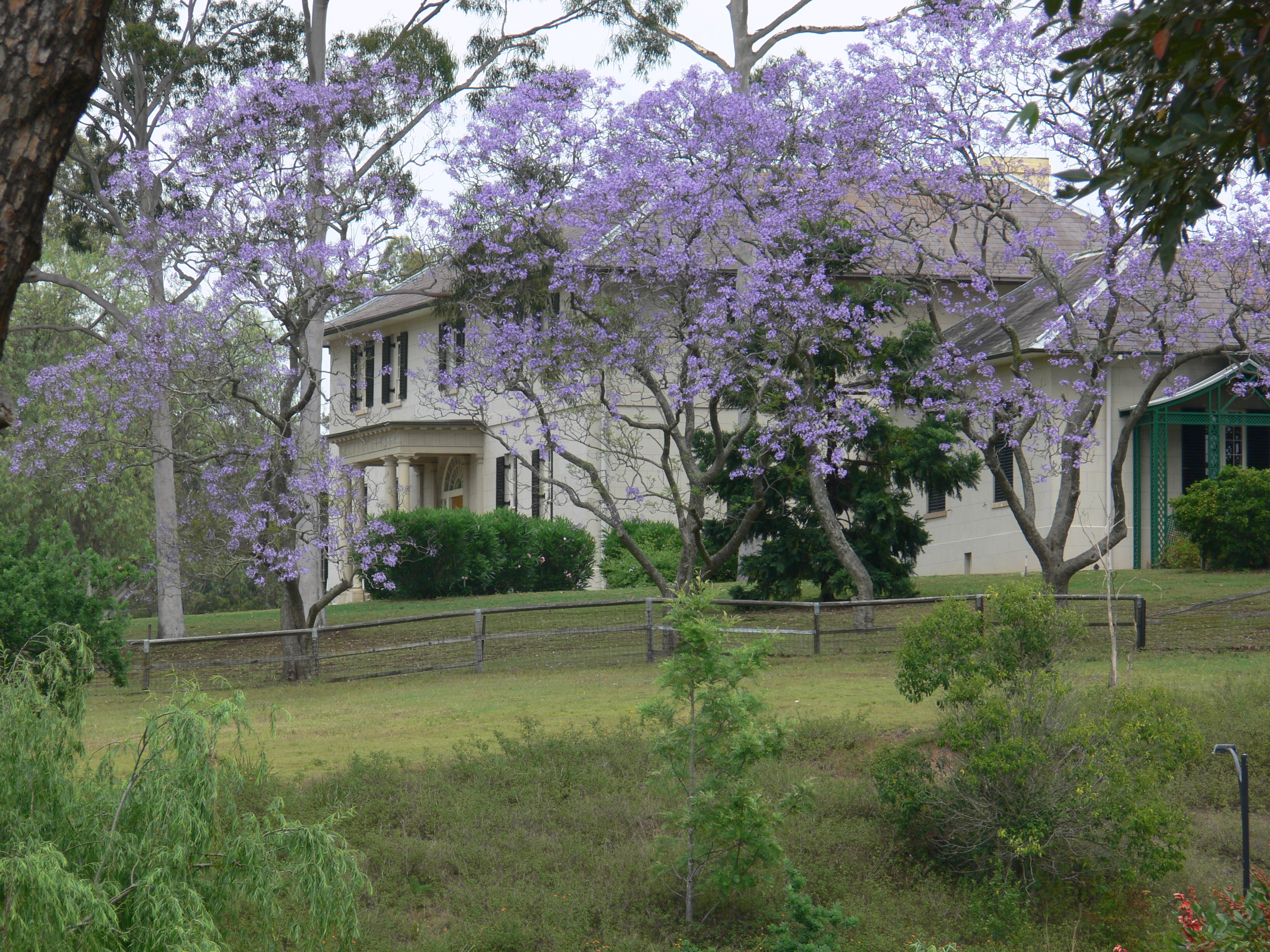
Government House in Spring

The formal entrance to the park (normally open only to pedestrians) is the grand gatehouse facing George Street. From here, George Street continues as a path up the hill to Old Government House. There are five other gatehouses or lodges at various entrances of the park.

The centrepiece of the park is Old Government House, which sits at the top of a hill overlooking a bend in the Parramatta River. The house is furnished in 1820s style, and is open to the public for an entrance fee. Near the Old Government House, Governor Brisbane's bath house has been converted into a park pavilion.

Also on the crest of the hill is the Boer War Memorial.

Domain Creek flows north across the western portion of the park, joining Parramatta River upstream of Parramatta Weir.

Several crossings of the Parramatta River are located inside the park. From downstream, these are Noller Bridge, Buttons Bridge and Ross Street Weir.

Sporting facilities are largely located in the southern portion of the park, south of the railway, and the northern portion, on the left bank of the Parramatta River, including Parramatta Stadium. Two children's playgrounds are located in the east (Paperbark Playground) and west (Domain Creek Playground) respectively.
