= Cycling in New South Wales =

Cycling in New South Wales, Australia is common for transport, recreation and sport.

== Community ==
Bicycle NSW is a member-based association representing bicycle users across New South Wales since 1976.

Bicycle User Groups (BUGs) are local volunteer groups of bike riders. Bicycle NSW maintains a list of BUGs across NSW.

In 2025, the National Walking and Cycling Participation Survey fund 14.8% of people in NSW had cycled in the last week, 25.1% in the last month, and 33.9% in the past year.

== Rail trails ==
- Fernleigh Track
- Glowworm Tunnel
- Northern Rivers
- Tumbarumba to Rosewood

== Fire trails ==
- Anderson's Fire Trail in the Blue Mountains
- Lady Carington Drive in the Royal National Park
- Leura to Mount Hay
- Manly Dam Reserve
- Mount York to Lawson's Long Alley in Mount Victoria
- Mount York to Berghofer's Pass in Mount Victoria
- Narrow Neck
- Newnes Junction to Newnes Tow
- Woodford to Glenbrook Fire Trail

== Regional Trails ==
- Central West Cycle Trail
- Orange 360

== Annual Rides ==
- Bathurst to Blaney
- Loop the Lake (Lake Macquarie)
- Sydney Spring Cycle (North Sydney to Olympic Park)
- The 'Gong Ride (Sydney to Wollongong)
- Wollombi Wild Ride (15, 30 and 60 km versions)

== Annual Races ==
- Cootamundra Haycarters and Recovery Race
- Cootamundra Classic and Recovery Race
- Wagga Wagga Cycle Classic and Criterium
- John Woodman Memorial – Wagga to Albury Cycle Classic
- Tolland Classic
- Ken Dinnerville Handicap
- Keegan Downes Memorial Handicap
- Gunnedah to Tamworth
- Grafton to Inverell Classic
- Indian Pacific Wheel Race

== Public transport ==
=== Buses ===
Bicycles are generally not carried on buses operated by the Government in NSW cities and towns. There are some exceptions, such as when cyclists are stranded by a ferry or train service being cancelled and buses are organised to carry passengers, including their bicycles.

Bicycles are carried by NSW TrainLink and private coaches on regional routes.

=== Ferries ===
See here for details about taking bicycles on ferries in Sydney.

=== Trains ===
For the price of a child's ticket, you can take your bicycle on NSW TrainLink Endeavour and Xplorer services to regional areas such as Kiama, Goulbourn and Canberra and Armidale. Hanging space is provided for bicycles in every second carriage.

XPT services (Melbourne, Brisbane, Dubbo) require bicycles to be boxed and placed in the luggage car.

== Regulations ==
=== Motorist regulations ===
Cars must stay a minimum of 1m away from cyclists when passing under 60 km/h and 1.5m when travelling over 60 km/h, and are permitted to cross white lines to do so. Driving a vehicle with the intiontion of "menacing" another person is an offence.

== Safety ==
According to Transport for NSW, in 2025 there were 12 fatalities of bike riders and 3 fatalities of e-bike riders. There was also 4 fatalities of pedestrians, 151 fatalities of car drivers and 58 fatalities of car passengers. In NSW in the 12 months to June 2025, 920 pedestrians were seriously injured and 1950 cyclists were seriously injured.

Cyclists make about 1.2 per cent of trips in NSW, but are the subject of 16 per cent of the state’s serious injuries. In NSW, pedestrian fatalities are more common in NSW than cyclist fatalities, but those driving cars are "almost exclusively" responsible. In Australia, motorists are at fault in over three quarters of reported collisions between motorists and cyclists.

Comprehensive data recording injuries between cyclists, pedestrians and e-mobility users is not collected. In the financial year to July 2025, 205 pedestrians were killed across Australia. An analysis found 2 of the 205 pedestrian fatalities in the year to June 2025 were caused by people using e-mobility devices. 85% of nationally reported cyclist casualty crashes involved another vehicle, and 2% cyclist injuries were related to pedestrians. In NSW between 2017 and 2022, serious injury trends for pedestrians hovered between 1041 and 893 between 2017 and 2022, while e-bike sales grew from 9000 in 2017 to around 200,000 by 2022.

In 2025, the Sydney Children’s Hospital Network stated 94 children have been injured while riding e-bikes in 2025, up from 60 in 2024 and 33 in 2023. In 2025, St Vincent's Hospital, Sydney found there were 200 e-bike related presentations to their emergency department in 2025, up from 103 in 2024 and 45 in 2023. Over half of the patients that presented in 2025 relating to e-bikes had to be admitted to hospital, and 10% of 2025 admitted e-bike related patients required admission to intensive care. More than 50% of injuries occurred at night, and alcohol or other drugs were often a factor.

== See also ==
- Australian Cyclists Party
- Cycling in Sydney
- Cycling in Australia
- Bicycle User Group
