= Cycling in Sydney =

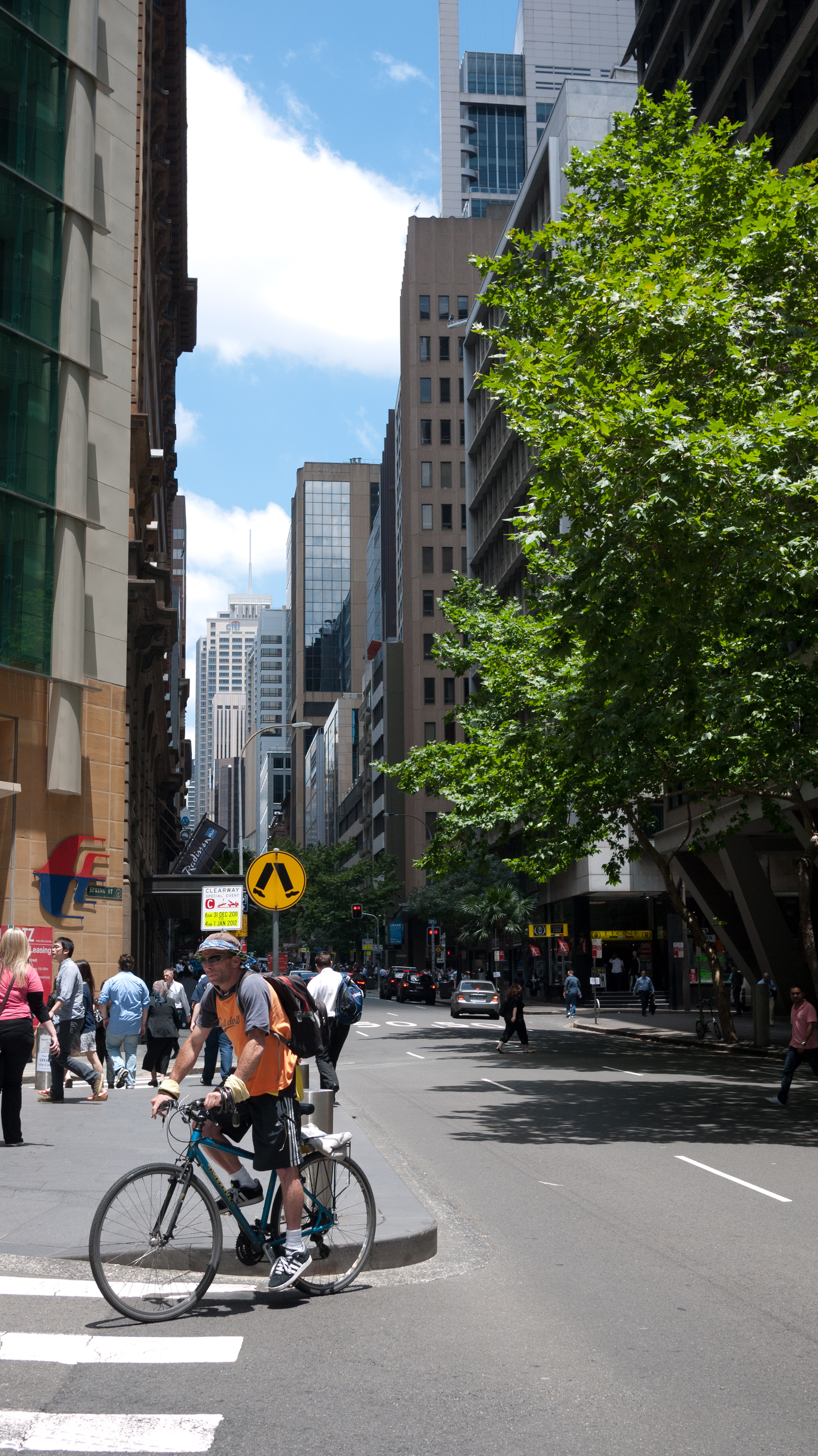
A cyclist in the Sydney city centre

Cycling in Sydney, Australia is common for transport, recreation and sport.

While Sydney has historically been hostile for cycling, with the construction of significant amounts of new cycling infrastructure Sydney is "increasingly becoming a cycling city" according to NSW Transport Minister John Graham. Since the introduction of separated cycleways in 2011, trips in the City have increased by 187% with mode share work commuting reaching 15-19% in some precincts. Sydney is now the second highest users of Lime share bikes in the world (after London).

While the City of Sydney (inner Sydney) has cycling levels similar to some dutch cities, councils outside the City have little safe infrastructure. With higher fuel prices, interest is growing in family e-bikes and commuting bikes. E-bike sales have grown from 9000 in 2017 to around 200,000 by 2022. By early 2026, the number of shared e-bikes in Sydney had quadrupled in less than two years, however there are plans to nearly halve the number in inner-Sydney. In March 2026, there were an estimated 48,000 weekday bicycle trips in the City of Sydney.

Sydney's overarching obstacle with implementing cycling infrastructure is its jurisdiction. Some cycleways in Sydney reflect "very ingrained views" in the NSW Government prioritising vehicles over pedestrians and cyclists. Slow approvals, limited government funding, and a lack of political leadership are barriers to wider cycleway delivery.

Moral panics over bicycles, cyclists and e-bikes in Sydney are common. Cycling and cycleways face persistent opposition from motorist lobby groups, conservative media, commentators, and heritage or other resident groups. The NRMA claims the government wastes money on cycleways and calls for them to be scrapped, along with advocating for confiscation of bicycles for illegal use, and spearheading campaigns to introduce mandatory registration and identification requirements for e-bikes. Business Sydney often call for a review or pause to cycleway construction, and claims the bike lane experiment or share bike experiment has failed. 2GB radio has a history of bike-bashing.

== Infrastructure ==
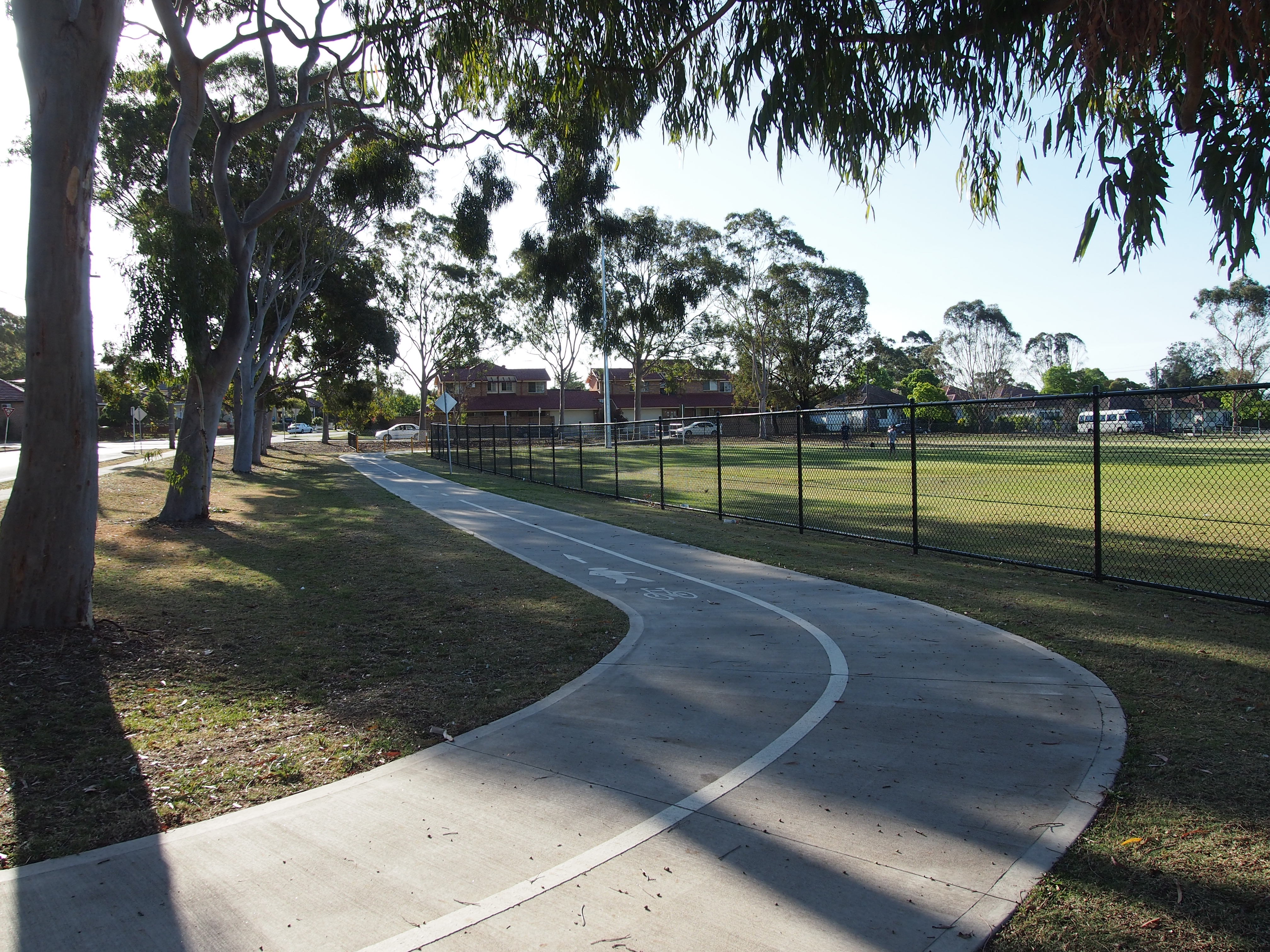
A bike path in Birrong

People riding bikes are allowed to cycle on the road, cycleways or shared paths, but only on footpaths cyclist is under 16 years old (or accompanying someone under 16 years old). Historically, bicycle infrastructure was largely constructed in areas for recreational riding or along shared paths such as in parks. Prior to the involvement of Jan Gehl, the City of Sydney created a Bicycle Action Plan in 2007, part of which involved building physically separated cycleways. In May 2009, the first of these, a 200m stretch along King Street in the CBD opened. In the following decade the number of commuter cycling trips doubled and the City of Sydney produced a Cycling Strategy and Action Plan 2018 – 2030. The plan sets out to prioritise connecting the cycleway network, supporting people to ride, supporting business to support their employees to ride and to lead by example.

Subsequently, longer segregated paths have been built along selected routes through the city. There had been plans to extend these separated routes, however these have largely not gone ahead, and some important commuter paths, like the College Street bike path, have actually been removed in 2015 at the insistence of Duncan Gay, the former Minister for Roads, Maritime and Freight (who has openly described himself as "the biggest bike lane sceptic in government") with the support of Mike Baird, a former Premier of New South Wales.

Another criticism of Sydney's separated paths is that the traffic lights preference cars over both pedestrians and cyclists. Not only are cyclists critical of the reported difficulty in triggering a light change, they are also unhappy that priority is afforded to cars by default, in much the same way that pedestrians must push a button before being included in the traffic light sequence.

Coinciding with the City of Sydney's new investment in cycleways, the state of NSW has repeatedly released statewide plans for bicycle infrastructure, including in 2010, BikePlan NSW. The plan is acknowledged by Bicycle NSW, but thought to be underfunded by local bicycle groups. While premier of NSW, Kristina Keneally bicycle commuted 10 km each way from the suburb of Pagewood to the CBD.

=== Bicycle Parking ===
There are many bike sheds and lockers across the Sydney train and metro network. This includes opal card operated security parking such as at Redfern, Green Square, Waterloo and Victoria Cross stations.

The City of Sydney council offers free parking for bicycles at Goulburn Street and Kings Cross car parks

=== Velodromes and criterum tracks ===
Sydney has several velodromes including the indoor Dunc Gray Velodrome (Bankstown), part of the Sydney 2000 Olympic Games. Outdoor tracks are located Hurstville Oval, Lidcombe Oval, Merrylands Oval and Tempe. The Heffron Park Criterium is a 2.04 km track in Maroubra, utilised by the Randwick Botany Cycling Club.

Many velodromes have been demolished including sites at Wiley Park, Camperdown and Surry Hills.

== Participation ==
The 2025 National Walking and Cycling Participation Survey found that:

- 33.1% Sydneysiders had cycled in the past year
- 24.6% had cycled within the last month,
- 14.2% within the last week.

According to the Minister for Roads John Graham, Sydney is increasingly becoming a cycling city. Sydney is the second highest user of Lime bikes in the world, behind London. Shared e-bike trips nearly doubled in 2025.

After a 2 month electric bicycle program in Western Sydney, a 2025 University of Sydney study found resulted 59% of participants reduced their car usage, 92% had increased confidence riding, 75% had higher levels of everyday cycling, along with well-being and social connection improvements. The program included subsidised e-bike access and additional guidance.

One restaurateur in Sydney utilises Lime bikes to transport wine from one restaurant to another. The most expensive they ever transported was a $5000 bottle.

Sydney has many cycling focused businesses offering services such as courses to build confidence and learn how to ride safely on road, bicycle fitting, frame and custom building, bicycle hire and guided tours.

== Planning and governance ==
=== Local government ===
One of the aims of BikePlan 2007–2017 is increasing total percentage trips in the city from 2% to 5% by 2011.

Aside from building cycleways, the City of Sydney has engaged in a publicity campaign, subsidised cycling courses, installed parking rings throughout the city. New development controls have been suggested which, among other things, require increasing bicycle facilities in residential and commercial properties. The City of Sydney's '2030 Sustainable Sydney' plan (2008) has a section dedicated to cycling.

Cooperation with other associations is often required. For example, the two bridges leading into the CBD are controlled by the Sydney Harbour Foreshore Authority (Pyrmont Bridge), and Transport for NSW (Sydney Harbour Bridge). The NSW government, through Transport for NSW, control all traffic lights (including on cycleways), arterial roads and speed limits. Although George Street was pedestrianised, ongoing efforts to make the city more friendly to non-motorised transport are made through agreements with the NSW state government.

Other city councils also have bicycle plans of varying scope, based on funding, local demand, and current facilities. In July 2010, Parramatta City Council installed secure bicycle storage area in their city areas, while proposing to reduce overall funding for cycling facilities.

=== State government ===
Transport for NSW is the state responsible for road infrastructure and safety. Their latest bike plan was produced in 2022.

The 'Action for Bikes 2010' plan, published in 1999, set out a costed, 10 year plan for the creation of a series of arterial bicycle networks across NSW.

== E-bikes ==
As of May 2026, the number of share e-bikes operating in Sydney was 20,000. In NSW there were over 1 million monthly share bike users.

=== Seizure of e-bikes ===
In February 2026 the New South Wales Government introduced new laws permitting NSW Police new powers to seize and crush illegal e-bikes. The proposed new measures were welcomed by the NRMA, which urged the community to get behind them. In 2026 the NRMA "spearheaded" a campaign to "introduce registration and identification requirements for e-bikes" and "calls for set of reforms around e-bike use".

==== Operation E-Voltage ====
Operation E-Voltage was conducted in March 2026. NSW Police officers spoke to 215 e-bike and e-scooter users, and issued 170 fines and 99 cautions. Some vehicles were classified as motorbikes under legislation.

In September 2026, NSW Police seized 36 e-bikes under the new regulations, as a joint operation of Transport for NSW and NSW Police named Operation E-Voltage. Police issued 16 penalty notices and 46 caution notices, for offences such as not wearing a helmet and mobile phone usage. Multiple trailer of bicycles were seized. Some bicycles were towed away by a NSW Government TMC Transport Commander vehicle and trailer. Police utilised drones to monitor the area and had born-worn cameras.

Police used a speed-testing dynamometer to detect suspect devices. Three of the 36 seized e-bikes was tested as being non-compliant. One bicycle tested registered a motorised speed of over 40km/h.

Local newspaper the Northern Beaches Advocate claimed the following day was noticeably quiet across the Northern Beaches as word appeared to spread. A number of comments on social media were noted and some riders claimed their bike was seized because of a minor traffic infringement.

The owner of Manly Bikes stated he was in contact with a teenager whose e‑bike he says was legal when police seized it.

James Griffin, the Opposition Member for Manly, commended the operation and called on NSW Labor to adopt mandatory bicycle licences.

==== October e-bike crushing ====
On 1 October 2026, the NSW Government crushed the first batch of illegal e-bikes seized under the new law. They were crushed into scrap metal at a wrecking yard in Blacktown. Of the 36 bikes seized in the operation, applications for the return of 13 bikes are still being assessed by NSW Police. In an ABC program titled Is it time for an e-bike crackdown?, Kellie Sloane claimed "E-bikes are a menace on our streets." Richard Buning said many devices are being listed as e-bikes when a lot of them are legal electric motorcycles. Kellie Sloane said the announcement was a 'photo op'. News Corp described it as a show-of-force.

On the same day Ed Lewis from St Vincent's Hospital was quoted in multiple stories about the crushing. The hospital published a press release on e-bike injuries on the same day. (Note: It also published e-bike safety press releases in February 2026. and February 2024.)

== Community ==
Bicycle NSW is the professional association represent people riding bicycles in NSW. Bicycle Network, originally Bicycle Victoria, is also a cycling membership organisation.

=== Bicycle User Groups (BUGs) ===
Bicycle User Groups (BUGs) operate in many regions of Sydney to assist and advocate for cyclists through an official affiliation or friendly association with Bicycle NSW. Bicycle NSW maintains a list of BUGs across NSW.

=== University bike clubs ===
- Sydney University
- University of New South Wales UNSW Bike Club was awarded Arc small club of the year in 2009.
- The University of Technology Sydney (UTS)

=== Cooperatives ===
Sydney has several community based bicycle cooperatives or organisations. Their activities include repair workshops, bike recycling, training and education.

- Cycle Re-cycle Workshop is in Waterloo helps working bikes go back into the community.
- Bicycle Garden in Alexandria runs weekly workshops and collects bikes for asylum seekers in Sydney.
- Bower Bikes, Tune-Ups, Rebuilds & Guided Repairs
- Bikes 4 Life alleviates poverty and social injustice in Australia and overseas by recycling and restoring discarded bikes. Currently operating from Kimbriki Resource Recovery Centre in Terry Hills.
- Newtown Bike Shed
- Revolve ReCYCLING aims to recover, recycle and redeploy Australia's bikes, e-bikes and scooters.

=== Other groups ===
- Balmain Bike Bus, run by members of the Sustainable Transport sub group of Climate Change Balmain-Rozelle. (Note: Previous Bike Bus groups appear to have shut down since.)
- Dulwich Hill Bicycle Club, a club for inner west Sydney cyclists.
- Neo Cycling Club, an Inner Western Sydney Cycling Club providing cycling events and group rides for both adults and juniors.

=== Bicycle NSW ===
Bicycle NSW is a member-based association representing bicycle users across New South Wales since 1976. Launched as the Bicycle Institute of NSW to advocate for the use of bicycles for transport, they continue to advocate for infrastructure to improve rider safety, along with hosting events. Membership of Bicycle NSW includes personal accident and third party liability insurance for cycling. Bicycle NSW began around June 1976.

== Wayfinding ==
Many councils provide cycling maps in paper and downloadable format. The NSW government provides a similar service

Several collaborative mapping services are available, some using Google Maps for their base layer

- Cycleway Finder (NSW Government)
- Open Cycle Map
- Bike Yak Sydney Trails
- BikeTrail.Blog Sydney Map

Bike riding experiences are published in these magazines.

- Bicycling Australia Magazine

== Public transport ==
Bicycles are permitted without charge on Sydney Trains, Sydney Metro and Sydney Ferries. They are not permitted on buses in Sydney. Folding bicycles are typically permitted on buses. Bicycles may be refused from ferry services if there is not enough room.

Converted e-bicycles (DIY conversions) are not permitted on public transport.

Some stations and ferry wharfs have enclosed bike sheds or lockers.

=== Trains ===
Most city trains do not have specific provision for bicycles, aside from the vestibule area. Intercity trains that utilise New South Wales D set carriages include dedicated space for bicycles.

As of 2025, there were 10 train stations labelled as not accessible by Transport for NSW.

=== Ferries ===
The Manly ferry service and Manly Fast Ferry services have a dedicated bicycle storage area.

A surcharge applies for the Cronulla to Bundeena service.

The Palm Beach to Central Coast ferry allows bicycles, with an additional fee of $3 as of 2026.

== Events ==
Bicycle NSW publishes upcoming organised events from various Bicycle User Groups.

Annual events include:

- Ride to Work Day in October
- Bobbin Head Cycle Classic
- Spring Cycle rides various routes aimed at families, held in October.
- The Gong Ride is a 90 km ride from Sydney to Wollongong, held in early November, raising money for MS Australia.

== Safety ==
While the City of Sydney (inner Sydney) has cycling levels similar to some dutch cities, councils outside the City have little safe infrastructure.

People walking and riding in inner Sydney are predominantly being killed by cars, truck and buses.

== See also ==
- Australian Cyclists Party
- Bike paths in Sydney
- Cycling in New South Wales
- Cycling in Australia
- Electric bicycle laws in New South Wales
