= Cycling in Melbourne =

Transport by bicycle in Melbourne, Australia

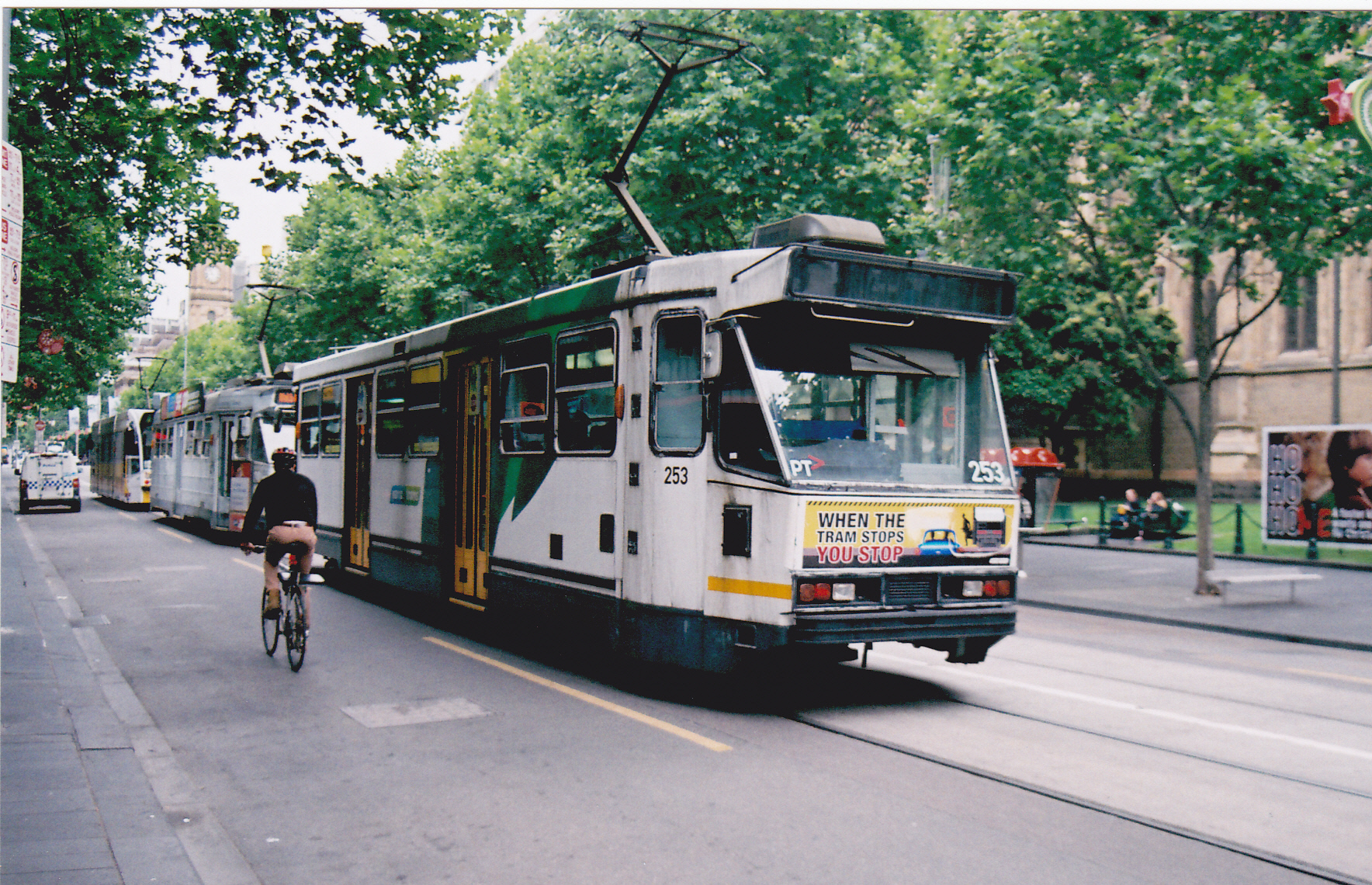
A cyclist rides side by side with a Melbourne tram on Swanston Street.

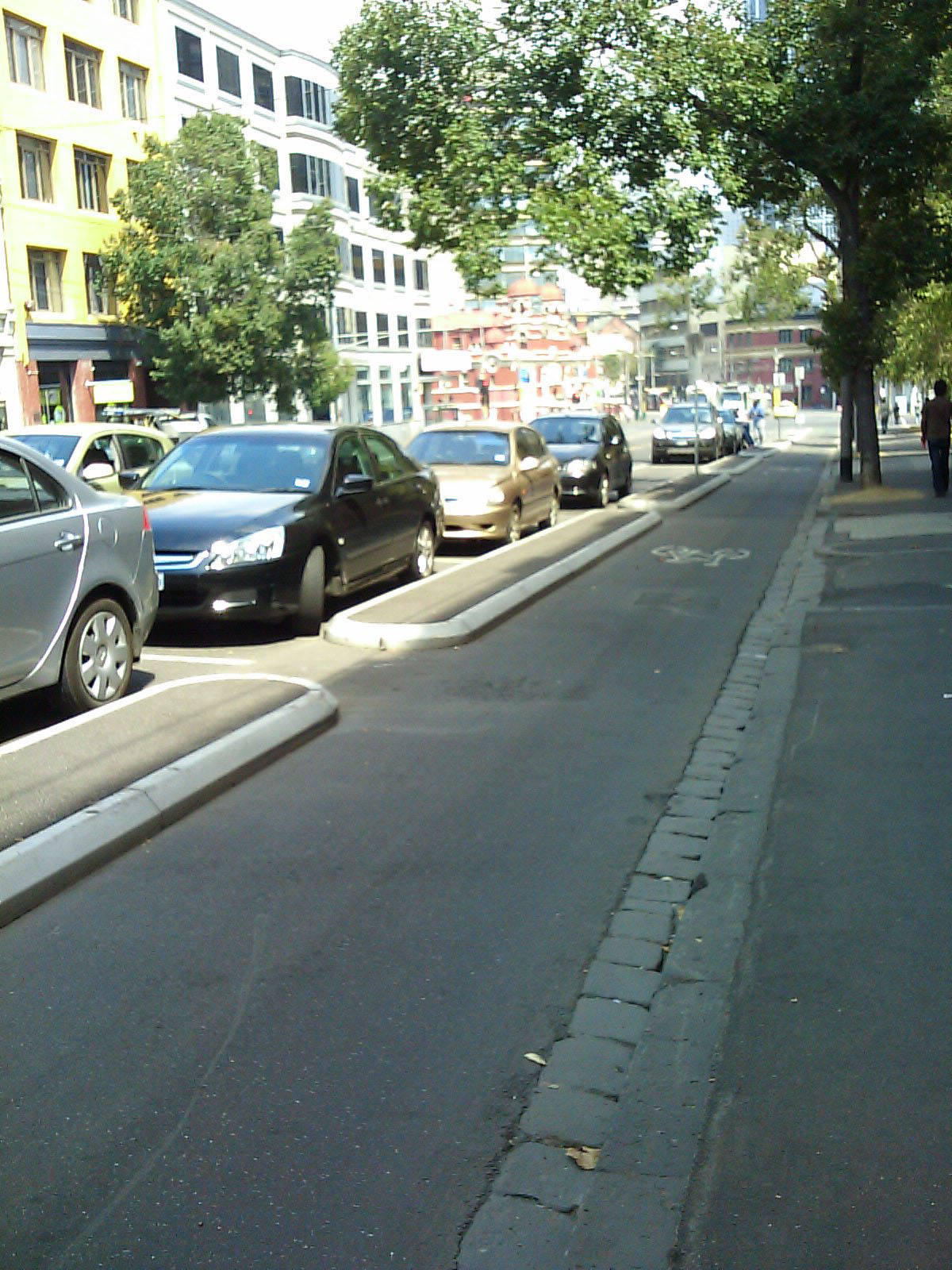
One of the few so-called "Copenhagen" cycle lanes in Melbourne

Cycling in Melbourne is an important mode of transport, fitness, sport and recreation in many parts of the city. After a period of significant decline through the mid to late 20th century, additional infrastructure investment, changing transport preferences and increasing congestion has resulted in a resurgence in the popularity of cycling for transport. This is assisted by Melbourne's natural characteristics of relatively flat topography and generally mild climate.

Despite an active cycling culture and an extensive network of off-road paths through some parts of the suburbs, Melbourne lacks the on-road cycling facilities that feature in many comparable cities in Europe and North America. Cycling infrastructure expenditure remains low compared to other cities and well below international recommendations. The introduction of mandatory helmet legislation (MHL) in Victoria in the early 1990s, the first such legislation in the developed world, may have further exacerbated the decline in cycling's popularity. Cycling's transport modal share accounts for less than 2% of all trips throughout the Melbourne metropolitan area, though bicycles comprised 16% of all morning peak-hour commuter vehicles entering the CBD in March 2017 – up from 9% in March 2008.

== History ==
=== 19th century ===
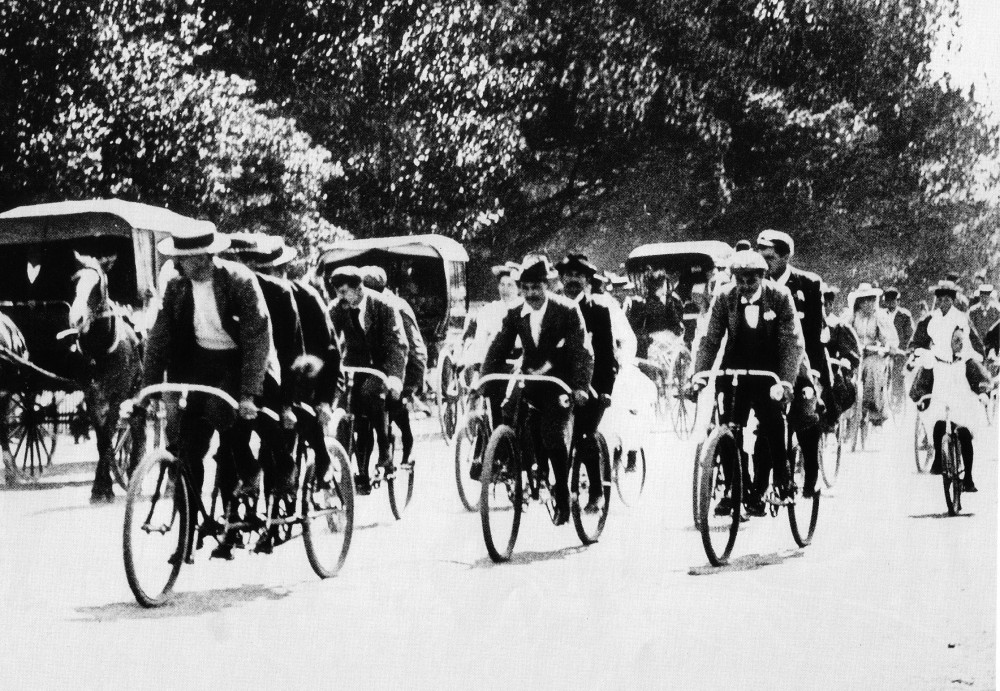
Sunday cyclists in Melbourne in 1895

During the worldwide bike boom of the 1890s, cycling was seen an exciting new option for transport taken up eagerly by many people. The craze for cycling in the 1890s is portrayed in the poem Mulga Bill's Bicycle by Australian poet Banjo Paterson, and many other ballads from the time. For women at the time, cycling provided the opportunity of more freedom and being able to wear less restrictive clothing, or rational dress.

Cycling clubs and societies were established in the 1880s and 1890s. In 1885, the Victorian Cyclists Union (VCU) was active, and the League of Victorian Wheelmen (LVW) was formed in 1893. Various notables of the era were members, such as University of Melbourne Professor of Engineering William Charles Kernot who was vice-president of the LVW for a time.

In the 1890s, cycle races like the Austral Wheel Race, and later the Melbourne to Warrnambool Classic, were very popular forms of entertainment, drawing crowds of many thousands. The first women's road race in Victoria occurred in Melbourne on Saturday 16 May 1896 on a hilly 11-mile (18 km) course through the northern suburbs of Northcote, Heidelberg, Ivanhoe, Alphington and Clifton Hill.

=== 20th century ===
Cycling provided an enduring activity for ordinary Melburnians until falling automobile prices and growing consumer affluence saw increasing numbers switch over to the car in the 1940s and 1950s. Up until the 1940s the bicycle was an important commuter vehicle for many Melbourne people. Post war affluence saw a decline in cycle commuting, and the bicycle was largely relegated to a children's or teenager's activity or for sporting or recreational use.

==== 1970s ====
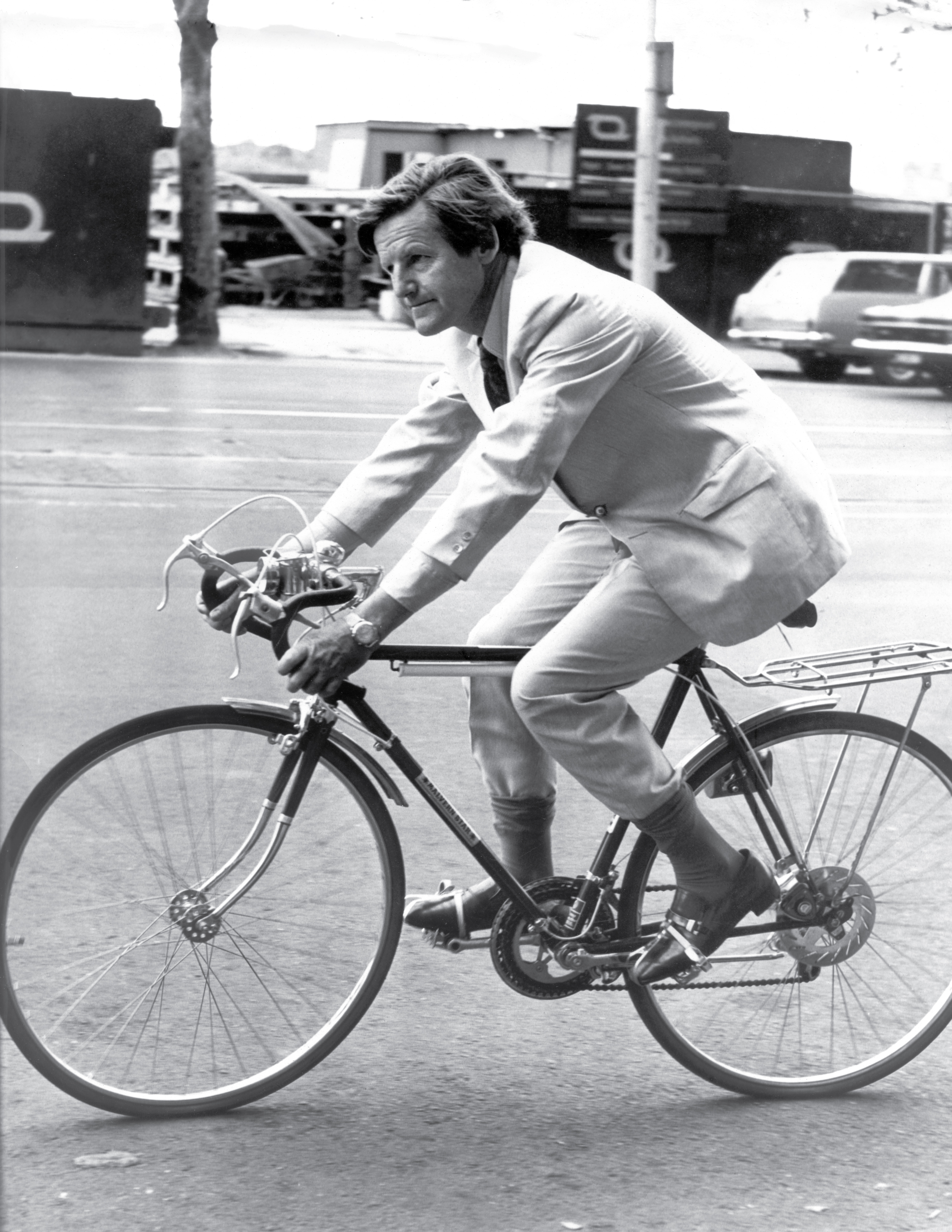
Keith Dunstan, first president of Bicycle Institute of Victoria, on his bicycle in Flinders Street, Melbourne in the 1970s

It was not until the 1970s that cycle commuting and cycle touring started being widely promoted and used again. Prominent in bicycle advocacy in Melbourne in the 1970s and 1980s was journalist and author Keith Dunstan.

From the 1970s onwards, cycling in Melbourne and the rest of Victoria was stimulated by a number of factors:

- The establishment of the Melbourne Bicycle Touring Club (MBTC) in October 1973. The MBTC aims to promote cycle touring and a healthy, active lifestyle. It has a fundamental commitment to public transport, making extensive use of the country and suburban train networks to get to and from the rides it runs.
- The Bicycle Institute of Victoria (later known as Bicycle Victoria, and now gone nationwide and known as Bicycle Network) started in 1975 with its first president being Keith Dunstan, as a broad appeal membership organisation to campaign for improved facilities and recognition of cyclists. As of 2017, Bicycle Network had grown to 50,000 members across Australia.
- Innovative supported tours by Friends of the Earth to Canberra to protest uranium mining – the FoE Rides Against Uranium – in 1975, 1976, and 1977.
- Australia's first bicycle plan instituted in the late 1970s in Geelong.
- Growing general environmental awareness of pollution, negative impact of automobiles, and protest at the construction of inner city freeways.

==== 1980s ====
In the 1980s, the first triple chainring, or granny gears, bicycles started being sold. Ron Shepherd, an engineer and founding member of the MBTC and Bicycle Institute of Victoria relentlessly promoted use of triple cranks to promote cycle touring among a wider audience.

In 1984, Bicycle Institute of Victoria organised the first Great Victorian Bike Ride with 2,100 participants, commonly regarded as the largest single touring bike ride in the world at that time.

==== 1990s ====
In 1990, Bicycle Victoria organised the launching of its first local government-based bicycle advocacy affiliates, the so-called Bicycle User Groups (BUGs), in Melbourne. As of 2017, these BUGs are still going strong, but often no longer closely affiliated with Bicycle Victoria (Bicycle Network).

In July 1990, mandatory helmet laws were first introduced in Victoria, the first state in Australia to do so. Victoria's mandatory helmet laws have been the matter of intense debate, both locally and internationally, over the years (see below).

In 1993, Bicycle Victoria launched the inaugural 210 km (130 mi) Around the Bay in a Day ride around Port Phillip Bay. This event, which in 2006 attracted more than 14,000 participants, is still held every October.

Also in 1993, Melbourne's first dedicated on-street bike lanes were installed on St Kilda Road, a 6 km (3.7 mi) long tree-lined boulevard leading into the CBD. The St Kilda Rd bike lanes have routinely been the object of severe safety criticism, mainly for forcing cyclists to ride in the door zone of parked cars.

In 1994, Bicycle Victoria inaugurated Australia's first Ride2Work Day. Ride to Work Day has now spread nationwide.

In November 1995, the first Melbourne Critical Mass was held. This has become a popular regular event with cyclists meeting in front of the State Library of Victoria at 5.30 pm on the last Friday of every month to ride around the city in safety as one mass. They are accompanied on a regular basis by Victoria Police's Bicycle Squad. Generally the police do not interfere in the event but act to facilitate its smooth movement to reduce any obstruction and to calm the antagonism of some car drivers.

=== 21st century ===
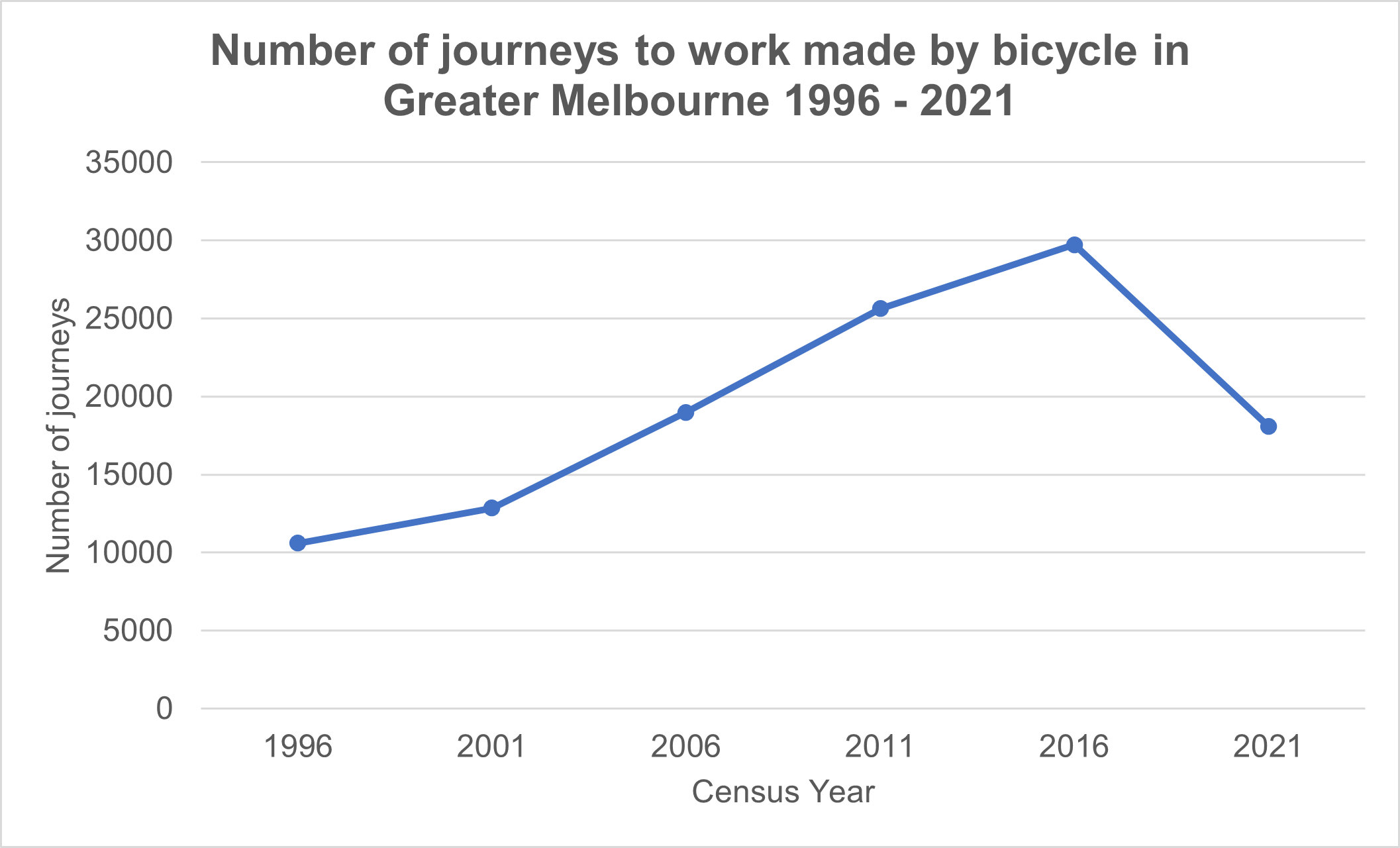
Trips to work made by bicycle between 1996 and 2021 in Greater Melbourne.

In 2004, the Royal Automobile Club of Victoria (RACV) introduced a Bike Assist membership option, to assist cyclists with punctures or basic repairs.

In 2008, regulation was introduced banning the carriage of bicycles on suburban trains during peak periods. However, this was rescinded several months later after an outcry from bicycle users.

In June 2010, a bicycle hire system called Melbourne Bike Share commenced operations, while another, oBike, launched in June 2017.

In 2014, the Australian Cyclists Party ran candidates in the Victorian state election in several electorates of the Victorian Legislative Council (upper house); though unsuccessful in getting into office, this is believed to be the first election contested by a dedicated party for cycling issues in the world.

Bicycle Network runs annual Ride2Work and Ride2School days to stimulate, with some success, cycle commuting. This is assisted by the formation of many workplace Bicycle User Groups (BUGS). The success of Ride2Work Day has since seen it become a national event.

== Facilities ==
=== Off road ===
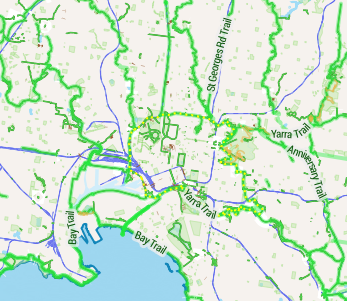
The innermost part of the Melbourne bike network

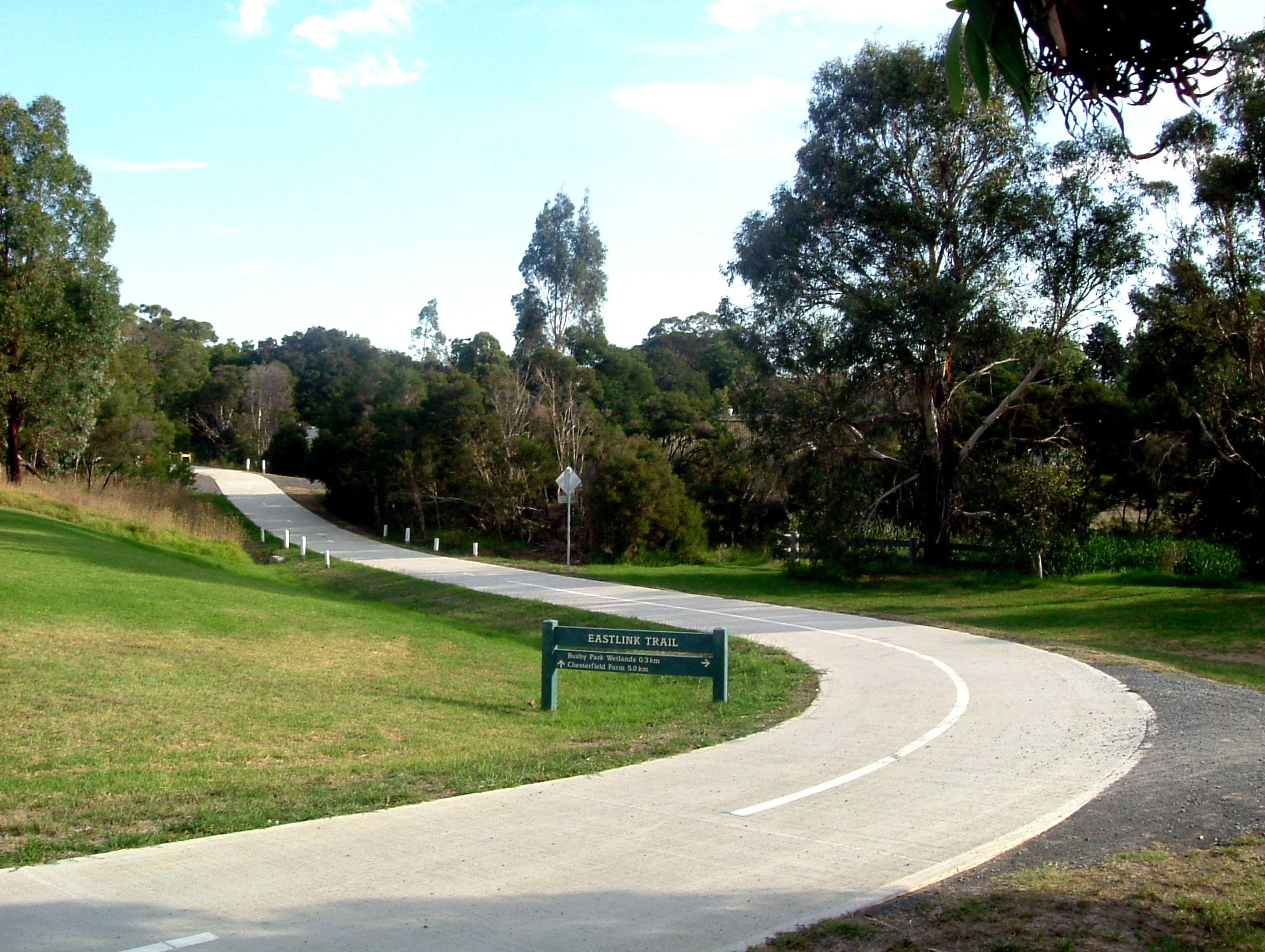
An off-road recreational cycling path in the eastern suburbs of Melbourne

The majority of Melbourne's bicycle network is located on paths that do not follow roads. These mostly follow parkland, railways and watercourses in a radial pattern to and from the area around the Central Business District.

Most paths are not dedicated for bicycles but instead designated as 'shared paths' that are also used by people walking, jogging or other active transport modes.

In April 2025, the Dixon Veloway – a cycling bridge above Footscray Road in Docklands, Victoria – was opened to the public. The new structure is exclusively for cyclists, with pedestrians needing to use the walking path below.

=== On road ===
While some central areas have bicycle lanes and other infrastructure, most roads do not have facilities for bicycles. There is a mixture of physically protected bicycle lanes on some roads but on road bicycle infrastructure mostly consists of signs and painted lines. Bicycles are prohibited from Melbourne's freeways, however are permitted on freeways in regional Victoria, with signs advising cyclists.

Since car-based transport planning commenced in Melbourne in the 20th century, bicycle infrastructure on roads has not been implemented or done sporadically. However, since the early 2000s, policy and legislation affecting cycling in Melbourne has been increasingly directing the state and local governments to recognise cycling as a mainstream transport mode which offers significant sustainability and health benefits. The 2010 Transport Integration Act sets a policy framework for creating a more integrated and sustainable transport system for Victoria including Melbourne and contains features which support improved conditions for cyclists.

Despite these small improvements and policy direction, levels of cycling in Melbourne remain low, with the most common reason given for not cycling being a lack of safe on road infrastructure.

=== Public transport ===
Carriage of bicycles is free on all suburban and regional trains, subject to space availability. Folding bicycles meeting specific criteria are permitted onboard trams and buses but all other bicycles are not allowed.

Bicycle racks on two metropolitan and two regional bus routes commenced April 2016. As of November 2017, the results from the trial have not been published but the trial has continued.

== Bicycle share programs ==
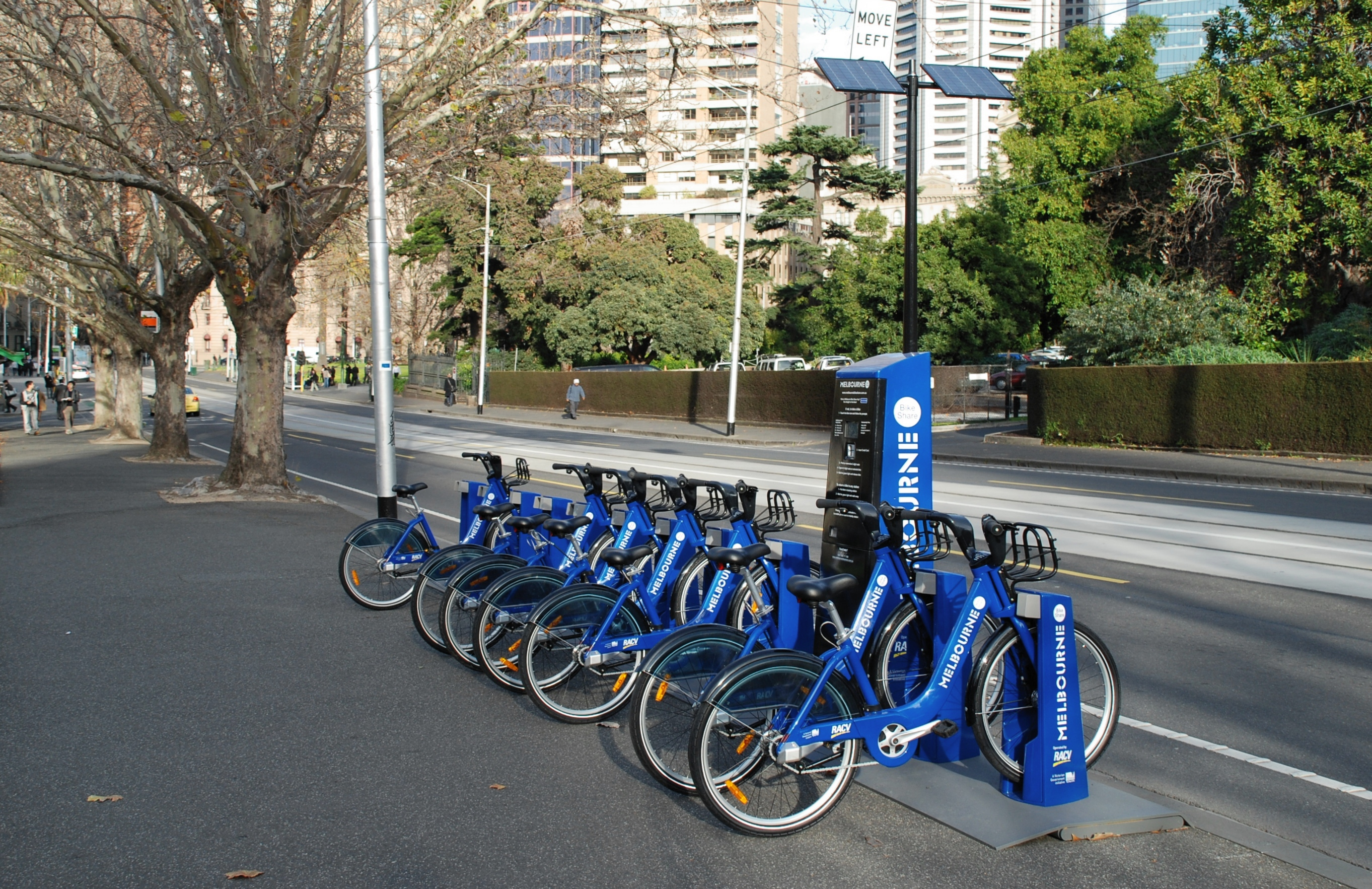
A Melbourne Bike Share station prior to their removal in 2019

Between 2010 and 2019 the government ran the Melbourne Bike Share program, the first public bicycle sharing system in Australia. On completion the system consisted of 53 docking stations with 676 bikes situated around the Melbourne CBD. The total cost was estimated at $5.5 million over four years. The system was operated by the Royal Automobile Club of Victoria and the US firm Alta Bicycle Share, which runs bicycle share systems in four North American cities. In 2019, the Melbourne bike share program was scrapped by the Victorian State Government due to low usage, with an average of one ride per day towards the end of the program. Some claimed this was due to the state's mandatory helmet laws.

Currently Melbourne does not have a docked bicycle share program, but does have dockless electric bike and e-scooter share programs in inner-Melbourne run by private companies Lime and Neuron. The e-bikes and e-scooters can use bike lanes, are speed-restricted and can only operate within the City of Melbourne, City of Port Philip and City of Yarra local government areas.

In 2026, the City of Yarra removed permission for Lime share bikes in the council area. The advocacy group Streets Alive Yarra told ABC News this was a "step backwards", and issues were partly caused by the City of Yarra not providing on street bicycle parking spaces or separated bike lanes. The group had previously called for designated share bike parking. The mayor Stephen Jolly claimed Lime had lax behaviour and used concerns about climate change as a smokescreen.

== Cycling as a sport ==
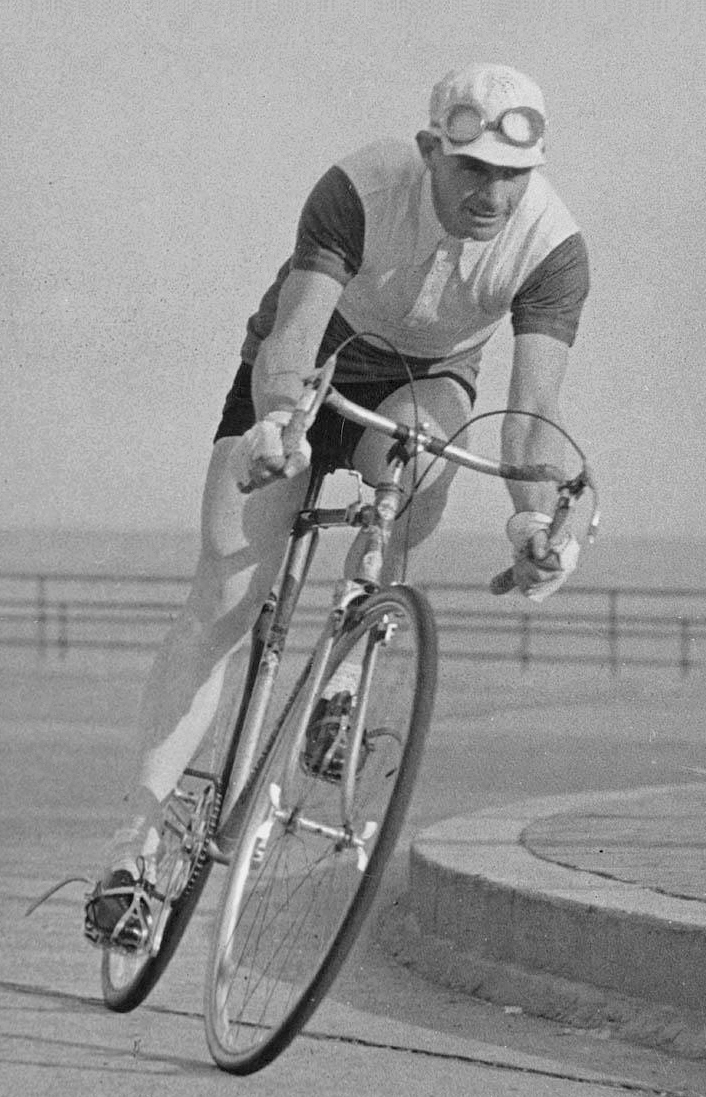
Sir Hubert Opperman, known as Oppy, was a competitive cyclist of international acclaim.

Victoria has produced many cycling athletes of world renown. Sir Hubert Opperman, "Oppy" (1904–1996), is perhaps the most well known and internationally recognised Australian cyclist of the 1920s and 1930s. As an Australian sportsman, his feats in cycling are compared with Sir Donald Bradman in cricket. He set the 24-hour road distance record of 505.75 mi (813.93 km) in 1939; the track record for 24 hours covering 489.3 miles (787.5 km) in 1940. He won the 1928 Bol D'or 24-hour race and the 1931 Paris–Brest–Paris 1,200 km (750 mi) marathon in record time of 49 hours 23 minutes. Many of his long-distance records stood for many years. In France and Australia he was feted as a sporting hero, with thousands attending a parade in his honour in Melbourne 1928.

Post-World War II, Geelong cyclist, Russell Mockridge, was widely described as "Australia's greatest all-round cyclist for all time". Due to his upper class accent he was initially dubbed Little Lord Fauntleroy; however, his race wins soon earned him the nickname of The Geelong Flyer. Mockridge was killed by a bus in 1958 participating in the 225 km (140 mi) Tour of Gippsland. He was just 2.1 mi (3.4 km) from the start of the race at the Dandenong Rd / Clayton Rd intersection in Melbourne.

Cycle racing continues to be popular in Melbourne with the Herald Sun Tour, since 1952, bringing professional cyclists from around the world for a multi-stage race around regional Victoria and Melbourne.

As of 2017, more than 25,000 cyclists, including triathletes and many elite riders, use Beach Road and the Nepean Highway from Black Rock to Mount Eliza on a typical weekend. Each Saturday morning the Hell Ride, a large bunch ride leaves from Black Rock at 7 am. It can contain up to 200 cyclists in summer months with speeds up to 60 km/h (37 mph). The Hell Ride is a politically contentious topic both amongst Melbourne cyclists and the broader community: most formal cycling organisations discourage their riders from participating, including Cycling Victoria.

A large number of local cycling clubs organise amateur-level racing, with criteriums mostly held in the summer and the road racing season in the winter months. Coburg Cycling Club, based in the Melbourne northern suburb of Coburg, is one of Australia's oldest cycling clubs. It was established as a social club in March 1896 by members of the St. Paul's church choir on Sydney Road. Members quickly found themselves participating in all levels of cycle sport. Many cyclists from the Coburg Cycling Club rose to prominence including Ivor 'Snowy' Munro, Ernie Bainbridge, Richard 'Fatty' Lamb, and the 1956 Olympian Richard 'Dick' Ploog.

== Safety ==
=== Rules and regulations ===
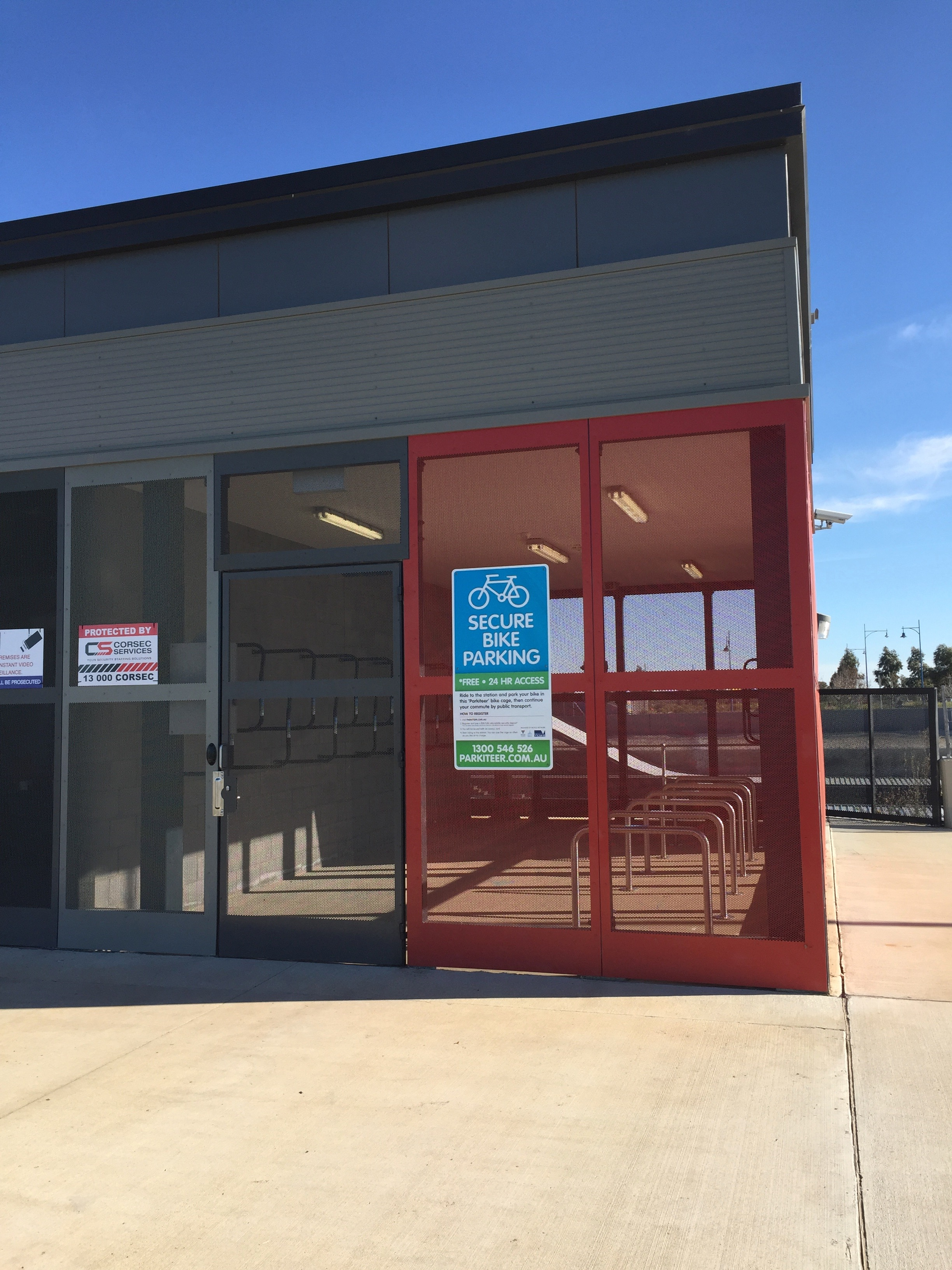
Parkiteer bicycle cage at Wyndham Vale station

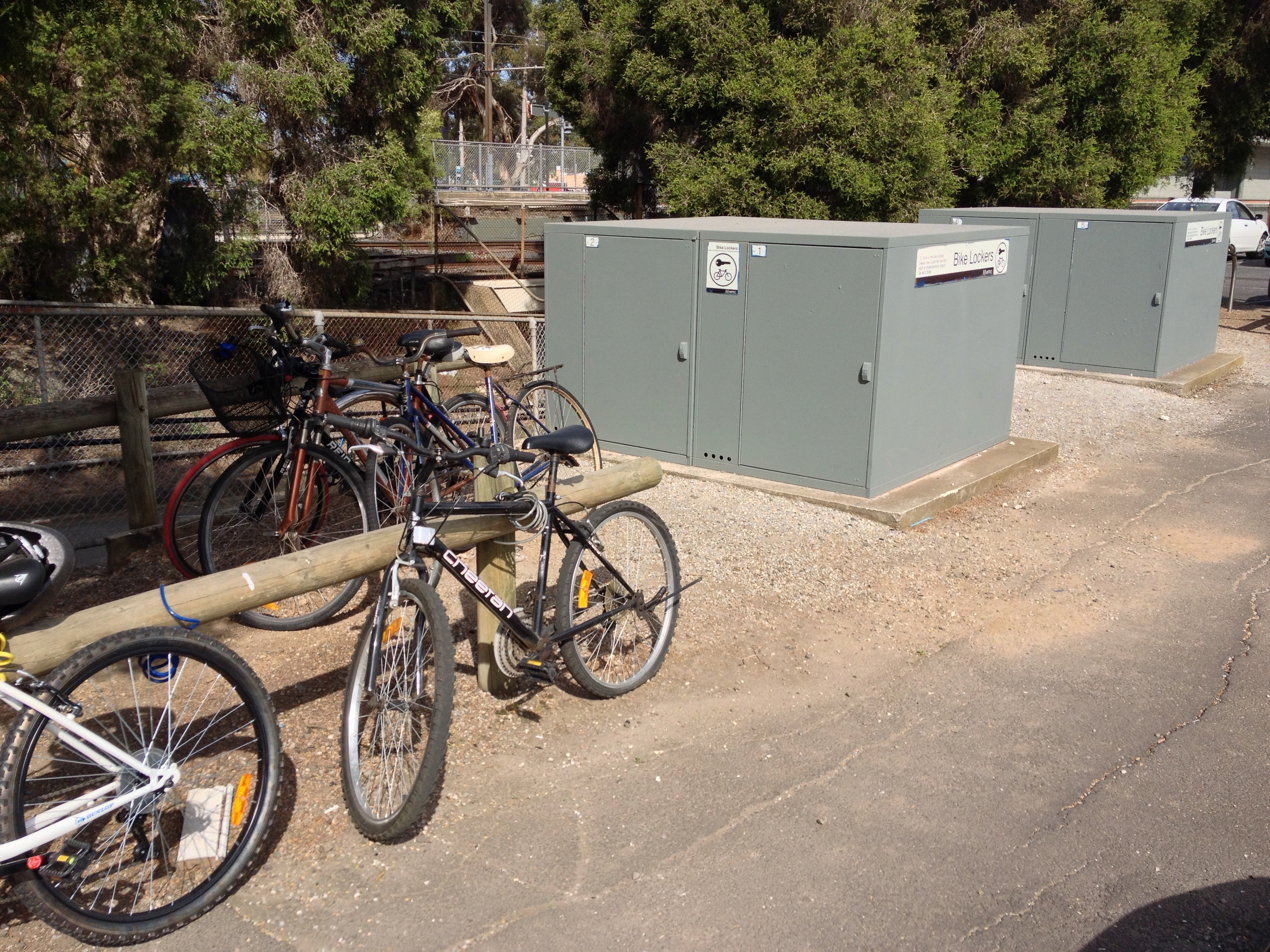
Melbourne's train travellers are often forced to park their bicycles any way they can. Pictured (at Albion station) are bikes locked to bike hoops, secured in lockers, and locked haphazardly.

Cyclists have the same rights and responsibilities as other road users, but some specific rules do apply.

==== Cycling equipment ====
Wearing of a helmet at all times, a working bell, and suitable lighting if riding at night are enforced by law.

Victoria's 1990 compulsory cycle helmet legislation was the first in the developed world, and – as with the other Australian states – it is believed to have had a strong negative impact on cycling modal share and modal share growth and recovery in Melbourne. Surveys carried out at the same 64 observation sites in May 1990 and May 1991 detected 29% fewer adults and 42% fewer child cyclists, with an overall reduction in cyclists of 36%. Further falls were recorded to May/June 1992, with teenage cycling reportedly showing a 46% decrease from pre-law levels. The limited injury reductions recorded among Melbourne cyclists did not match the actual decline in cycling. This has led some experts to the conclusion that the law has actually resulted in increased rates of injury among Melbourne's cyclists. The law has also reportedly resulted in significant police efforts against cyclists. As of 2003, Victoria Police were still issuing around 20,000 Bicycle Offence Penalty Notices a year. Since the law, cycling in Melbourne has never been able to recover its previous share of the transport split. In 1985–6, 3.4% of trips in Melbourne were by bicycle, 2004 data showed a decline to 2.0%. The experience of Melbourne's cyclists has given added impetus to the efforts of cyclists in Europe and elsewhere to resist, or repeal, such helmet laws.

== Bicycle parking ==
Bicycle theft is a problem in Melbourne.

Official road rules (Rule 166. Application of Part to bicycles) regarding bicycle parking appear to state that Part 12 of the Rules ("Restrictions on stopping and parking") does not apply to bicycles that are parked at bicycle rails or bicycle racks. In practice these facilities are not always available and affixing the bike to street poles is common and does not seem to be penalised.

=== Bicycle parking at railway stations ===
Bicycle parking at Melbourne's train stations for what is known as Bike + Ride travel, can be problematic. A secure bicycle parking place needs to be pre-arranged or users risk bicycle theft or vandalism by parking a bike out in the open.

As of November 2017, secure Parkiteer bicycle parking stations are installed at 78 of Melbourne's 207 train stations. Prospective users of the Parkiteer scheme must register with Bicycle Network for access to a specific Parkiteer cage and, if a vacancy is available, pay a $50 refundable deposit for an electronic access card which enables access for that cage only.

Some Melbourne train stations, including those with Parkiteers, have bike lockers which can fit a single bike in them. If a spare locker is available it can be rented for free for up to three months at a time, but a bond must be paid.

If users have not pre-arranged access to a Parkiteer spot or to a bike locker, most train stations also have bicycle hoops or something similar, but often there are not enough hoops available and train travellers are forced to lock their bikes to railings, signposts, fences, or other fixed objects.

== Organisations and groups ==
- Bicycle Network – a self-funded health promotion charity, owned collectively by all of its members. Bicycle Network works to build more cycling infrastructure, organises their popular "Great Rides", co-ordinates programs such as Ride2Work and Ride2School and provide practical and legal information to achieve their aim of "More People Cycling More Often". Members receive benefits that include crash cover and support, Ride On a bi-monthly full-colour magazine, and help Bicycle Network to advocate for improved riding conditions for all bike riders.
- Australian Cycle Alliance – an Australia-wide cycling advocacy group founded in Melbourne.
- There are many Bicycle User Groups around the Melbourne metropolitan area, usually located in, and committed to working in, a single local government area or other locality.
- Melbourne Critical Mass
- The Bike Shed at CERES teach bike maintenance.

== See also ==
- Cycling in Geelong
- Cycling in Victoria
- Cycling in Australia
- Cycling Victoria – the peak governing body for organised competitive and recreational cycling within Victoria
