= Janet Rice =

Australian politician

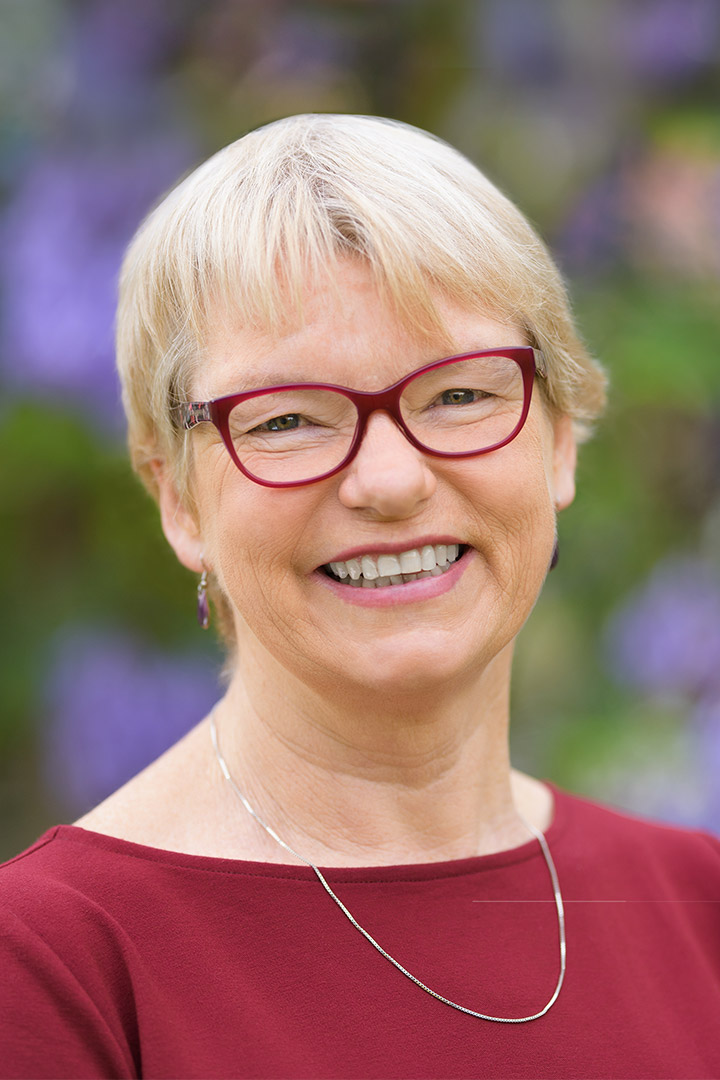

Senator for Victoria
- In office 1 July 2014 – 19 April 2024
- Succeeded by: Steph Hodgins-May

Councillor of the City of Maribyrnong for Saltwater Ward
- In office 15 March 2003 – 29 November 2008

Personal details
- Born: 18 November 1960 (age 65) Melbourne, Victoria, Australia
- Party: Greens (1992–present)
- Spouse: Penny Whetton (m. 1986; died 2019)
- Education: University of Melbourne
- Occupation: Politician, environmentalist
- Website: Official website

Janet Elizabeth Rice (born 18 November 1960) is an Australian former politician. She served as a senator for Victoria from 2014 until 2024. She was a co-founder of the Victorian Greens and also served on the Maribyrnong City Council from 2003 to 2008, including a term as mayor.

== Early life ==
Rice was born on 18 November 1960 in the Melbourne suburb of Altona. She attended the University of Melbourne, where she studied mathematics and meteorology. It was at Melbourne University where she met her partner, Penny Whetton, another student in the meteorology department. Rice began her environmental activism whilst at university, including participating in the Franklin Dam Campaign in 1983.

Rice completed a Bachelor of Science, graduating with honours in meteorology.

== Career before politics ==
Rice began her career in September 1983 as a Nature Conservation Project Officer for the Conservation Council of Victoria now known as Environment Victoria where she was involved in policy and advocacy work on nature conservation issues for 2 years. In 1985, Rice moved to the East Gippsland Coalition as a forest campaigner. She was a leader of the campaign that resulted in the declaration of the Errinundra National Park and protection of the old growth forests of the Rodger River catchment in the Snow River National Park in 1988. Rice continued her work with the East Gippsland Coalition until 1990.

In 1985–1986, Rice worked as a Water Policy Officer at the Department of Water Resources, where she authored reports on Gippsland Water Resource and South East Region water management strategy and Environmental Aspects of Water Management Strategy for South West Victoria.

Rice worked for Bicycle Victoria from 1993 to 1997, as the inaugural Ride to Work Co-ordinator. She developed the Ride to Work Day program, which started with 615 cyclists and has grown to an estimated 60,000 participants all over Australia. From Bicycle Victoria, Rice pursued her career as a Senior Consultant at Context Pty Ltd. Rice worked with clients including the Barwon Water, Melbourne Water, Parks Victoria and a range of local governments. After leaving Context, Rice began her own facilitation and consultancy practice, Janet Rice Facilitation and Community Involvement. Rice was employed by the Hume City Council as their Senior Strategic Transport Planner.

Rice was also a Member of the School Council for Footscray City Primary School becoming the President between 2002 and 2003.

Rice is a Member of the advisory board at the Centre of Governance and Management of Public Transport.

== Political career ==
Rice was a key element in establishing Australian Greens Victoria. She organised preliminary meetings, and helped form the green politics network just as the October 1992 Victorian state election approached. The Victorian Greens was officially launched on 7 November 1992.

Rice started her political career when in 2003 she was elected as a councillor for the City of Maribyrnong, where she represented the Saltwater Ward. As a Councillor, Rice focused on Transport and Planning issues. She was Chair of the Metropolitan Transport Forum between 2004 and 2008. Rice's publications and presentations on transport include a chapter in the book "Transit Oriented Development: Making it Happen' (Curtis, Renne and Bertolini, 2009).

Rice was elected Mayor of Maribyrnong in 2006. During her mayoral term, she created the Maribyrnong Truck Action Group which succeeded in banning trucks from entering central Footscray. Rice was also a part of the Save Footscray Pool campaign, trying to preserve the aging facility and keep the site from developers. Rice remained in the council until 2008.

In 2008 and 2010, Rice worked with Greens member for the Western Metropolitan Region, Colleen Hartland, managing community campaigns across Hartland's electorate.

Rice was the lead Senate candidate for the Australian Greens Victoria for the 2013 Australian federal election and was elected on a 10.85 percent primary vote.

Rice took her seat in the Senate on 1 July 2014, and was sworn in on 7 July 2014.

Rice was re-elected in the 2016 Australian federal double-dissolution election, running second on the Australian Greens Victoria ticket.

Rice was again re-elected at the 2019 federal election, with a final Senate vote of 10.6%.

As of 2020, Rice served as the Greens' Party Room Chair and Deputy Whip, and acts as the spokesperson for the following:

- Foreign Affairs
- Multiculturalism
- Forests
- LGBTIQ
- Transport & Infrastructure
- Science, Research & Innovation

In September 2023 Rice announced she would not re-contest her Victorian Senate position and would retire in the first half of 2024. Her resignation was formalised on 19 April 2024. Upon retirement Steph Hodgins-May was appointed to fill Rice's Senate seat.

On 29 February 2024, the Senate voted to censure Rice after she raised a placard with the words “stop the human rights abuses” while Philippine President Bongbong Marcos was addressing parliament. She was escorted out of the House accompanied by Barbara Pocock. Rice defended her action afterwards stating that it was “on behalf of every Filipino person whose human rights have been abused by the government of President Marcos and the government of former president Duterte before him”. Rice also elaborated on the recent history of human rights abuses by the government in the Philippines, including the imprisonment and killing of labor leaders, workers, environmental defenders, and human rights lawyers. Rice, along with the Human Rights Network of the Philippines, investigated these cases a few years ago when she visited the Philippines. Filipino senator Robin Padilla, a former convict turned controversial ally of both Duterte and Marcos, on March 4, 2024 filed a resolution in the Philippine Senate to condemn Rice and declare her persona non grata.

== Personal life ==
Rice lives in Footscray, Victoria with her two sons. Her wife was Penny Whetton, until her death on 11 September 2019.

Coinciding with her wife's gender transition, Rice came out as bisexual. She is currently one of eight members in the Parliament of Australia who are openly part of the LGBTI community.
