= Rotary River Ride =

The Rotary River Ride is a non-competitive bicycle ride held next to the Yarra River in Melbourne, Victoria, Australia. Money raised helps finance the efforts of the Rotary in Australia.

The event consists of three options, which primarily follow the Yarra River Trail:

- 50 kilometres (31 mi) Gold route
- 30 kilometres (19 mi) Silver route
- 15 kilometres (9.3 mi) Bronze route

== See also ==
- Cycling in Victoria
