= SKCC =

SKCC may refer to:

- Shariff Kabunsuan Cultural Complex, a convention center in Cotabato City, Philippines
- St Kilda Cycling Club, an Australian cycling club
- SKCC, the ICAO code for Camilo Daza International Airport, Cúcuta, Colombia
