= High Country Cycle Challenge =

The High Country Cycle Challenge is a non competitive ride held near Mansfield, Victoria, Australia.

The 2007 event consisted of a three-stage 230-kilometre-long (140 mi) challenge including the ascent of Mount Buller.

The Scody High Country Challenge is a single day, non competitive road cycling event. In 2013 the event consisted of four rides of various length and difficulty, ranging between 65 kilometres (40 mi) and 165 kilometres (103 mi). The rides all originate in Mansfield.

== See also ==
- Cycling in Victoria
