= Shepparton Fruit Loop Ride =

The Shepparton Fruit Loop Ride is non-competitive charitable cycle ride held in the area around Shepparton, Victoria, Australia. Money raised helps finance the efforts of the Goulburn Valley Hospice. The ride is so named due to the large amount of stone fruit grown in the Goulburn Valley and Shepparton region.

The 2006 event consisted of three options and raised $42,000 for the hospice:

- 200 kilometres (120 mi) route with hills
- 100 kilometres (62 mi) route
- 50 kilometres (31 mi) route

== See also ==
- Cycling in Victoria
