= Ride To Work Day =

Ride To Work Day may refer to:

- National Ride to Work Day, an Australian commuter cycling social movement to promote commuting by bicycle
- Ride to Work Day, an event associated with Ride To Work to promote motorcycling as a transportation alternative

== See also ==
- Bike-to-Work Day, an annual event in the U.S. and Canada to promote commuting by bicycle
