= Cycling in Geelong =

Bicycle parked outside Deakin University at the Geelong Waterfront.

Cycling in Geelong, Victoria is common for recreation and competition, but less so for utility and commuting.

Geelong has a discontinuous network of off-road trails and on-road bicycle lanes.

Geelong's major shared riding and walking trails are the Bellarine Rail Trail, Barwon river, Bay, Ted Wilson and Waurn Ponds creek trails.

A series of rider fatalities and the safety of bike riding in and around the Geelong has received media and political attention.

A 2016 announcement of plans for a two-way separated bike lane in central Geelong was welcomed by bike groups.

== History ==
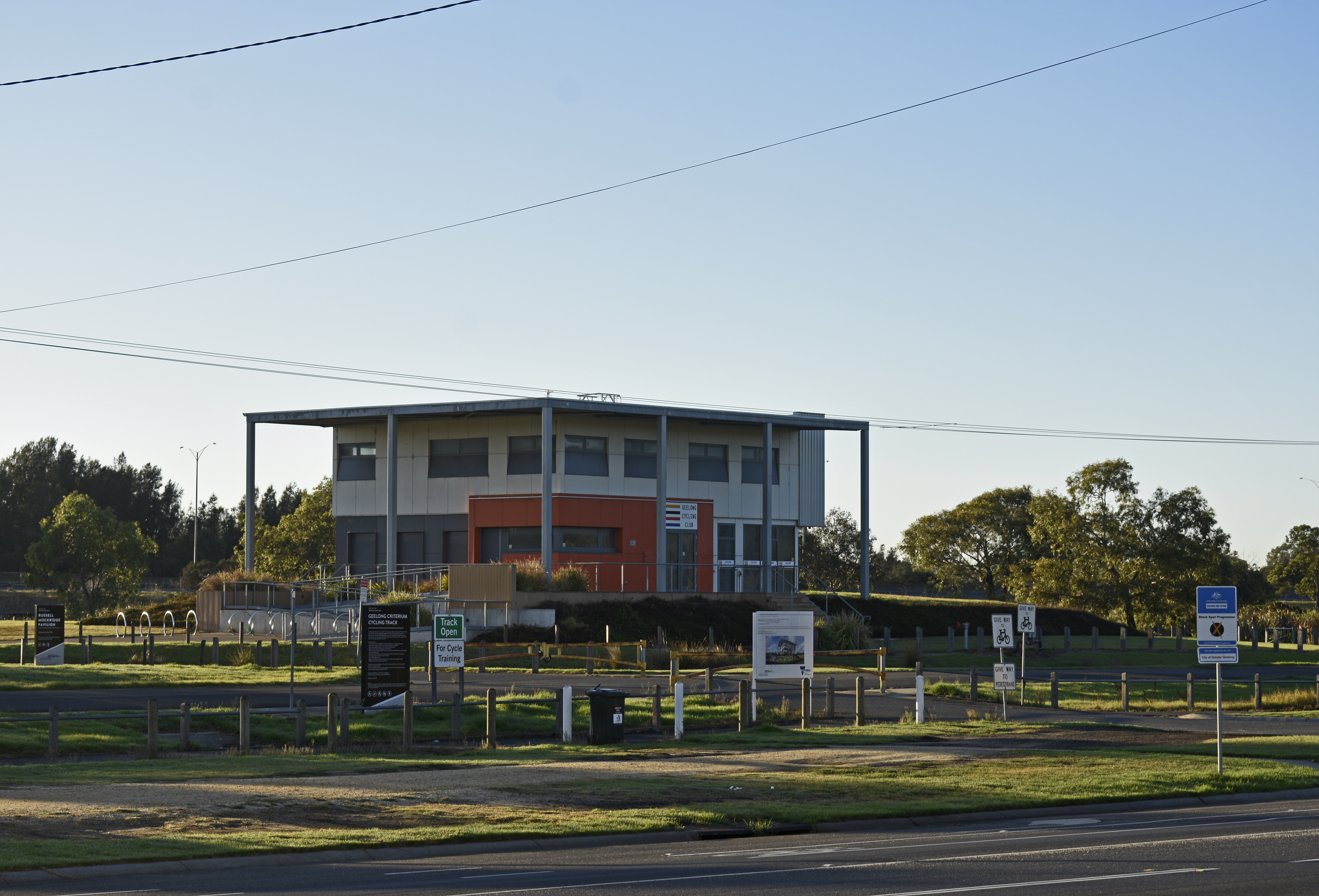
Russell Mockridge Pavilion in Belmont, hosting the Geelong Cycling Club

The Geelong Cycling Club (formerly the Geelong West Cycling Club) started in 1911.

In 1977 efforts were made to improve cycling in Geelong with Australia's first bike plan launched by Hubert Opperman. The plan's credo was that "every street is a cycling street". The plan was also widely recognised at the time as a model for bicycle planning. As a result of the plan, a recreational cycling group called the Geelong Bicycle Riders' Association was formed in 1979 and is now known as the Geelong Touring Cyclists.

Later, the 1996 Barwon Bicycle Plan set out targets of achieving 8% of all journeys in the region by bicycle in the year 2000 and 15% by the year 2005, but this along with the Geelong Cycling Strategy 2008–2013 have failed to stop the reduction in ridership in a vehicle dominated era.

Bicycle Users Geelong was formed in 1995 by the Barwon Regional Bicycle Council.

A Geelong Critical Mass (cycling) ride was started in 2010 and is no longer active.

In 2014, a Priority Bicycle Network (PBN) was adopted by the Geelong Council. Its aims being to "elevate the importance of routes within the overall bicycle network and to prioritise works to be undertaken to improve conditions for cyclists".

== Competitive cycling ==
The annual Cadel Evans Great Ocean Road Race is held in Geelong. The 2010 UCI Road World Championships race was held in Geelong.

Russell Mockridge and Leigh Howard are some of Geelong's best known racing cyclists. Tour De France winner Cadel Evans has lived in Barwon Heads, Victoria – a township on the outskirts of the City of Greater Geelong municipality.

== Bicycle organisations and groups ==
- Bikesafe (Geelong and Surfcoast)
- Cycling Geelong
- Geelong Cycling Club
- Geelong Touring Cyclists

== See also ==
- Bicycle Network
- Cycling in Australia
- Cycling in Victoria
- Cycling in Melbourne
