= Ted Wilson trail =

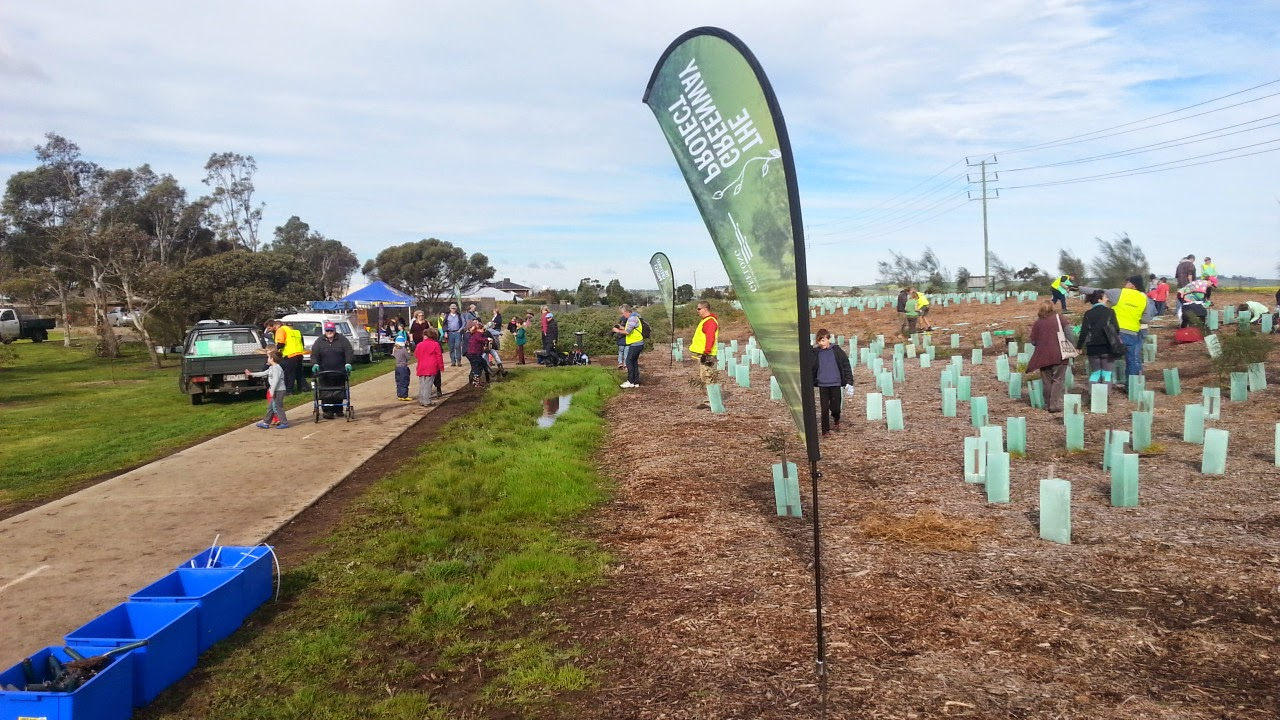
A 2014 community planting day event on the Ted Wilson trail

The Ted Wilson trail is a 12 kilometre walking and cycling path in north west of Geelong, Victoria (Australia).

The path trails along the Western ring road through the suburbs of Corio, Lovely Banks, Bell Post Hill and Hamlyn Heights.

It was named in honour of Ted Wilson (former police sergeant and manager of the Bicycle Co-ordination Unit) for his contribution to cycling through the Barwon Regional Bicycle Council and the City of Greater Geelong's bicycle strategy.

Cycling Geelong run an annual memorial ride for Ted Wilson on the trail, providing a sprig of rosemary to participants.

In 2014, the City of Greater Geelong started The Greenway Project which committed to planting over 60,000 trees and 20,000 shrubs and grasses by 2018 along the trail.

== See also ==
- Cycling in Geelong
