= Penny Whetton =

Australian climatologist (1958–2019)

Dr. Penny Whetton
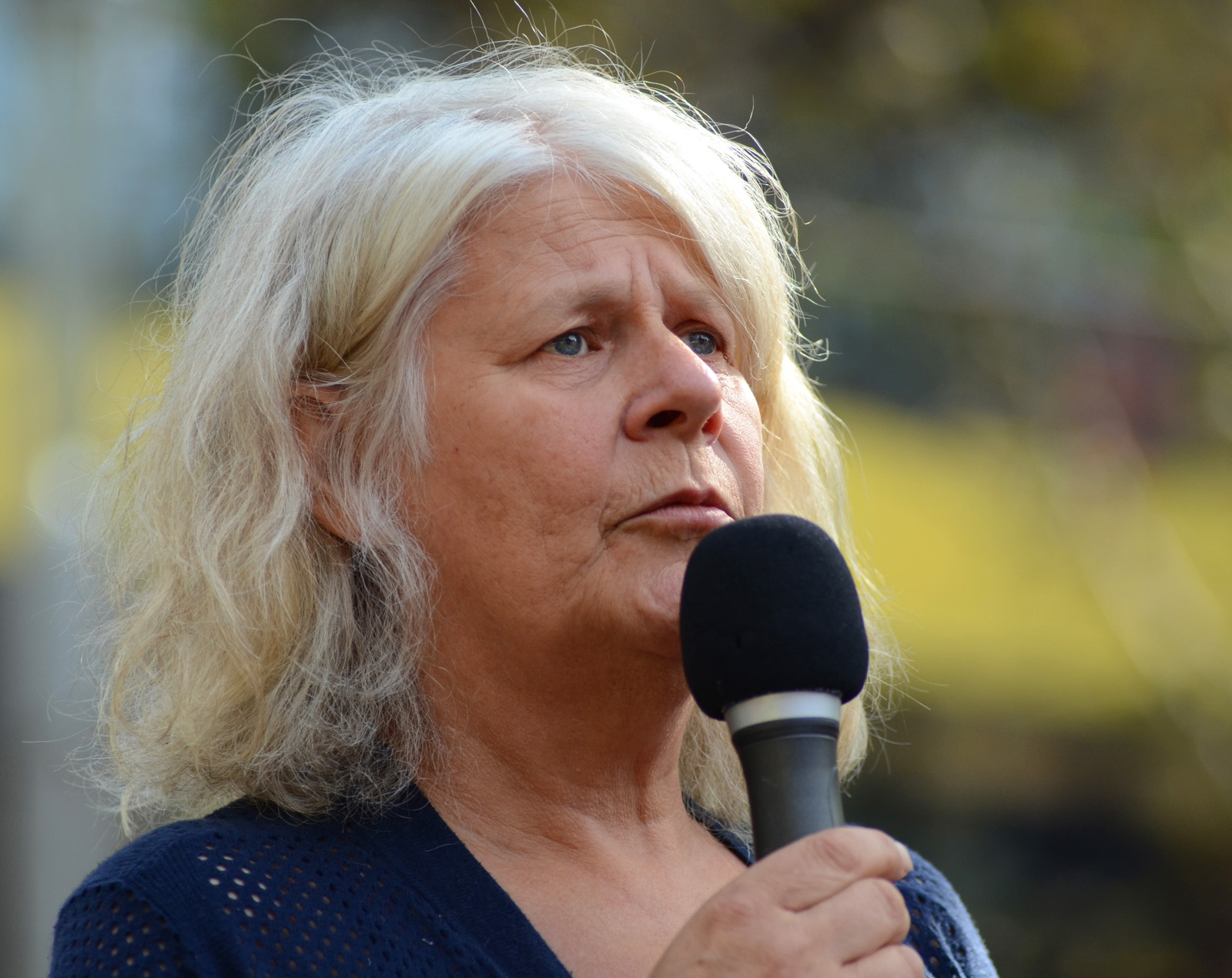
- Penny Whetton in 2017
- Born: 5 January 1958; Melbourne, Victoria, Australia
- Died: 11 September 2019 (aged 61); Sisters Beach, Tasmania, Australia
- Education: University of Melbourne
- Occupation: Climatologist
- Spouse: Janet Rice (m. 1986)
- Children: John Rice-Whetton; Leon Rice-Whetton

Penny Whetton (5 January 1958 – 11 September 2019) served as a leader as a climatologist and an advocate for and communicator about the need for powerful action on climate change. She was actively engaged in the communication of climate change projections for Australia, leading to an improved national understanding of and preparedness to respond to climate change.

== Early life ==
Whetton was born in Melbourne, Victoria, on 5 January 1958. She held a Bachelor of Science (Honors), majoring in physics, and an honors year in meteorology from the University of Melbourne. She additionally received a Doctor of Philosophy degree in Meteorology/Climate from the same university in 1986.

== Career ==
Whetton started her career in the late 1980s as a researcher in the Department of Geography at Monash University in Clayton, Victoria.

In 1989, she joined the Atmospheric Research division of CSIRO (later becoming CMAR CSIRO Marine and Atmospheric Research). Whetton became a research leader in 1999 and a research program leader in 2009. Whetton was a Lead Author on the Third, Fourth, and Fifth Assessment Reports of the UN Intergovernmental Panel on Climate Change (IPCC). The Fourth Assessment Report of which was awarded the Nobel Peace Prize in 2007. Whetton distinguished 25-years at CSIRO, and was the lead author of three reports by the Intergovernmental Panel on Climate Change.

Whetton was an invited speaker at various climate change conferences such as the Aspen Global Change Institute, Australia in a Hot World at the University of Melbourne in 2011, and the Greenhouse 2011: The Science of Climate Change conference.

Whetton published numerous scientific journal articles on climate change as well as a contribution to more popular publications. Including some of her own work, "Potential impacts of climate change on soil organic carbon and productivity in pastures of south eastern Australia", "Seasonal and regional signature of the projected southern Australian rainfall reduction," and many more within ResearchGate.

== Personal life ==
Whetton lived in Footscray, Victoria, with her wife Janet Rice, a Greens Senator and former Mayor of Maribyrnong, and their two children. In 2003, Whetton underwent gender-affirming surgery.

Whetton died on 11 September 2019 in Sisters Beach, Tasmania.
