= Linear Park Arts Discovery Trail =

- Length: 3.65 km
- Location: Melbourne, Victoria, Australia
- Difficulty: Easy
- Hills: Minimal
- Train: Regular services to Warragul Station

The Linear Park Arts Discovery Trail is a trail covering several adjacent parks in Warragul, Victoria. It features painted bollards, mosaics and murals.

== Connections ==
The Drouin to Warragul Two Towns Trail finishes at the Linear Park Arts Discovery Trail.
