= Cycling in Victoria =

Cycling in the Australian state of Victoria (including its capital Melbourne) is a popular pastime, sport and way of getting around since at least 1896, as indicated by the Banjo Paterson poem Mulga Bill's Bicycle. Cycling in Victoria has been encouraged by the development of bicycle networks in town and cities throughout the state, and many regional rail trails. The sports popularity has been encouraged by the success of racing clubs such as the St Kilda Cycling Club and Victorian racing riders such as Cadel Evans, Simon Gerrans and Matthew Lloyd. Organised rides held annually including the Great Victorian Bike Ride, and races held in Victoria include the Herald Sun Tour.

== Regional rail trails ==
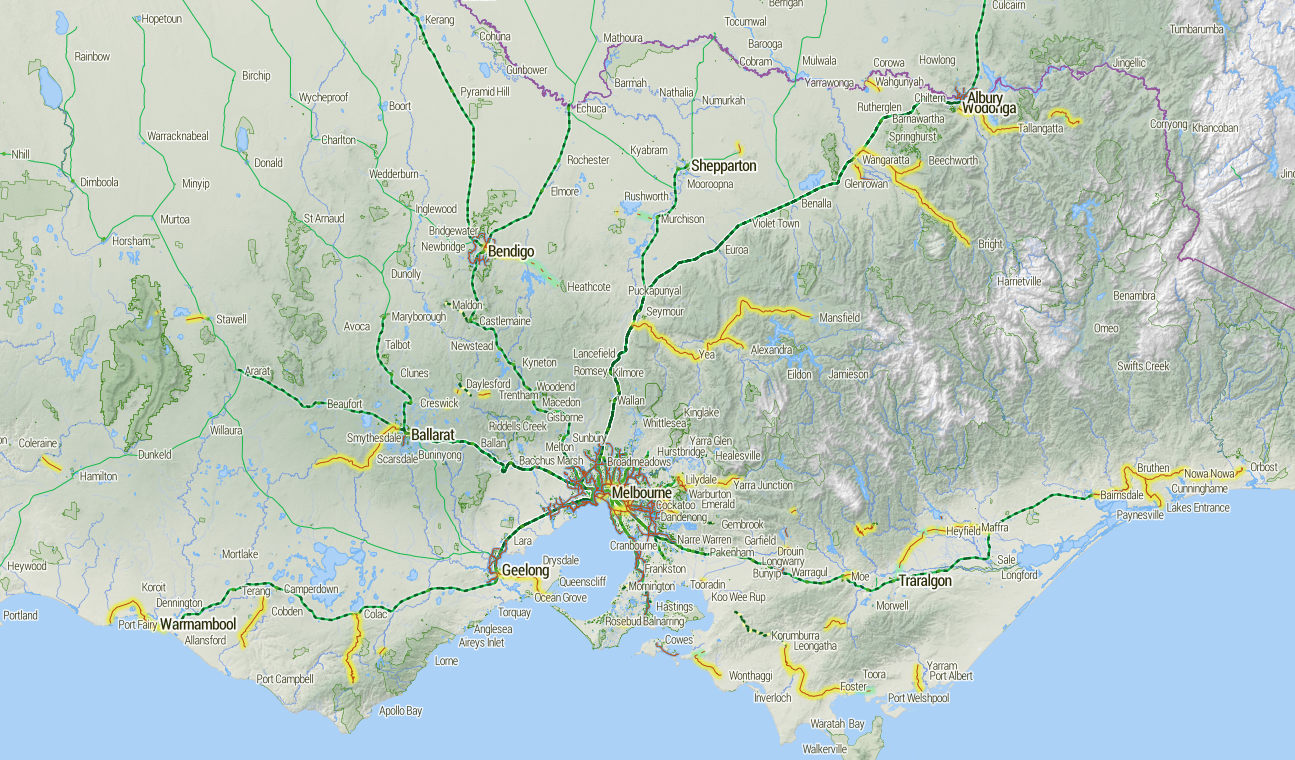
Map showing all rail trails in Victoria.

Victoria also has many developed rail trails suitable for cycling including:

- Ballarat-Skipton Rail Trail, Ballarat
- Bass Coast Rail Trail, South Gippsland
- Bellarine Rail Trail, Bellarine Peninsula
- Crater to Coast Rail Trail, Camperdown
- East Gippsland Rail Trail, East Gippsland
- Great Southern Rail Trail, South Gippsland
- High Country Rail Trail, Lake Hume
- Moe-Yallourn Rail Trail
- Murray to the Mountains, Wangaratta
- O'Keefe Rail Trail, Bendigo
- Old Beechy Rail Trail, Colac
- Tyers Valley Tramway, Gippsland
- Warburton Trail, Warburton
- Drouin to Warragul Trail, Drouin – Warragul, Gippsland
- Linear Park Arts Discovery Trail, Warragul, Gippsland
- Rokeby to Neerim Trail, Gippsland

== Safety ==
According to VicRoads, hazards that cause cycling fatalities and injuries include "side impact at intersections", "manoeuvring", and "lane change," as well as collisions between car doors and cyclists in the door zone, commonly referred to as "car dooring" in Australia.

In Victoria it is illegal to "cause a hazard to any person or vehicle by opening a door of a vehicle, leaving a door of a vehicle open, or getting off, or out of, a vehicle" and it is also illegal to flee the scene of such an accident.

While there were 1112 collisions caused by opening doors in the Australian state of Victoria between 2000 and 2010, the first fatality occurred in March 2010, when a car door opening caused university student James Cross to be propelled under the wheels of a passing truck. Eight percent of serious injuries to cyclists between 2006 and 2010 were caused by car doorings.

In July 2012 Victoria increased the on-the-spot penalty for car dooring from $141 to $352, also increasing the maximum court imposed penalty from $432 to $1408. In March 2015, stickers were placed in taxis in the state, advising passengers to look for bicycles before leaving the vehicle; at the time 13% of car dooring incidents in the state involved taxis.

== See also ==
- Australian Cyclists Party
- Cycling in Melbourne
- Cycling in Geelong
- Outline of cycling
