= Melbourne Bike Share =

Bicycle-sharing system in Melbourne, Australia

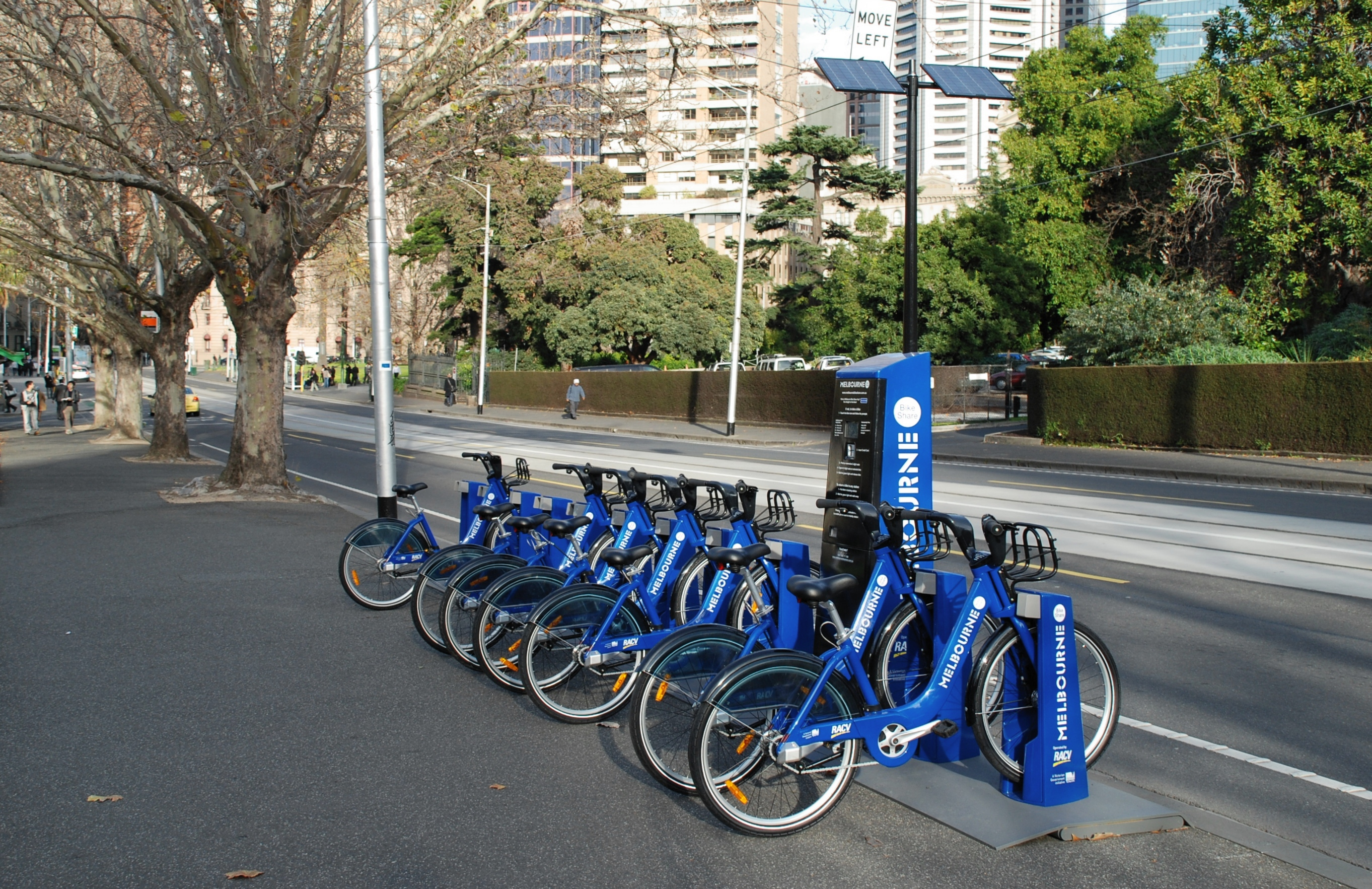

Overview
- Locale: Melbourne, Australia
- Transit type: Bicycle-sharing system
- Number of stations: 51
- Website: www.melbournebikeshare.com.au

Operation
- Began operation: 2010; 16 years ago
- Ended operation: November 30, 2019; 6 years ago
- Operator: RACV
- Number of vehicles: 600

Melbourne Bike Share was a bicycle-sharing system that served the central business district of Melbourne, Australia. The stations and bicycles were owned by the government and operated in a public–private partnership with RACV. Launched in 2010, the network utilized a system designed by Montreal-based PBSC Urban Solutions with 600 bicycles operating from 51 stations. Melbourne Bike Share was one of two such systems in Australia until the Victorian Government shut down the service on 30 November 2019.

Initially Melbourne Bike Share experienced low ridership. As of May 2011, users had made about 13,000 trips each month, short of the goal of 25,000 trips per month. A mandatory helmet law was cited as reason. In November 2010, the Victoria state government began offering helmet rentals at selected stations in an attempt to increase both ridership and helmet usage.

The Victorian Government decided in May 2013 to trial free helmet sharing by attaching the helmets to the handlebars of a portion of the bike share fleet.

The service offered a variety of daily, weekly and annual passes as well as a pay-as-you-go option.

RACV reported in their Annual Report that 170,000 rides took place between July 2015 and June 2016.

== History ==
Melbourne's MBS and CityCycle in Brisbane were, until the introduction of Vancouver, British Columbia, Canada's bike-sharing service, some of the few schemes in the world that attempt to operate under a mandatory helmet requirement.

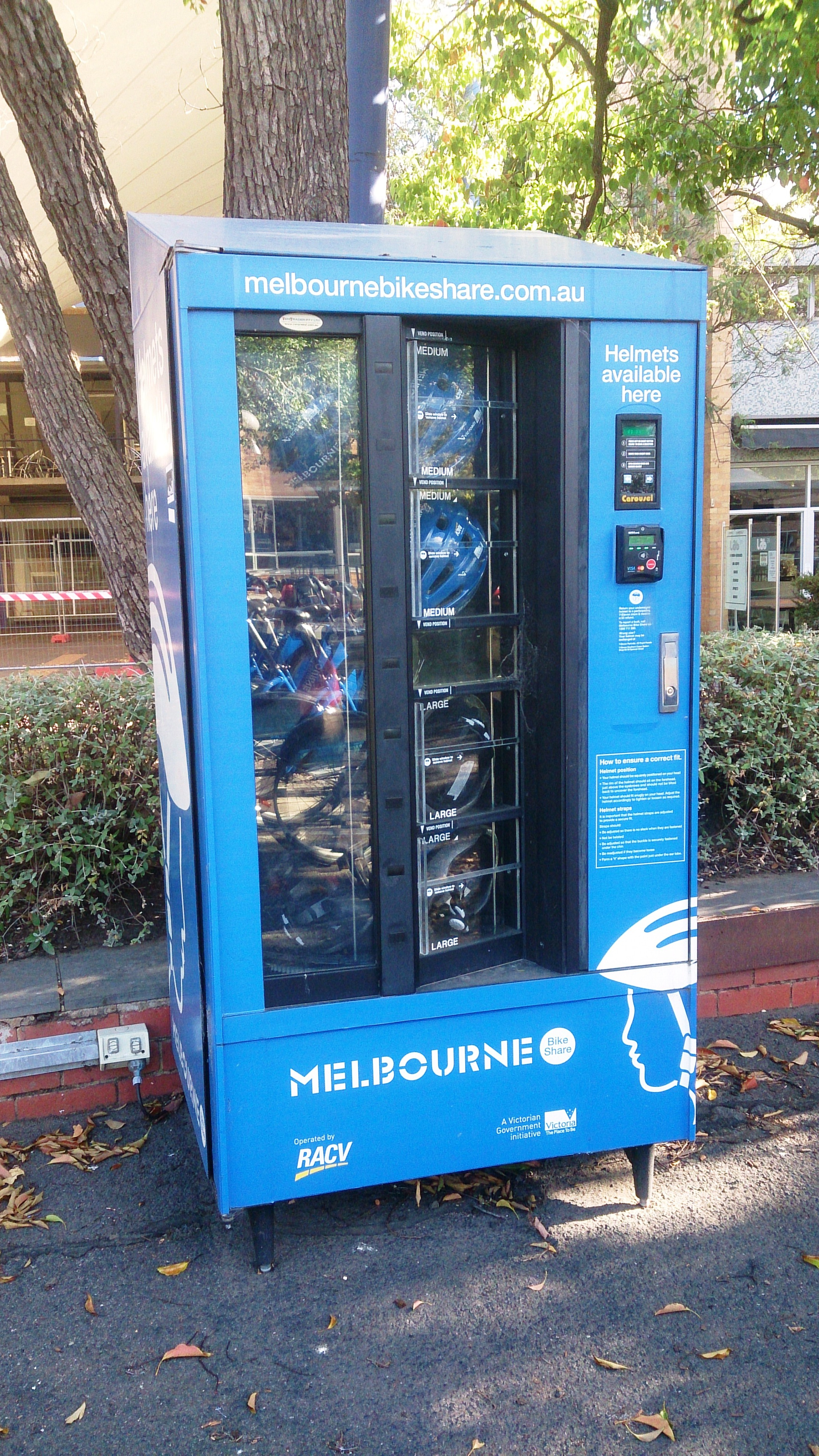
A bicycle helmets vending machine in The University of Melbourne Parkville campus, Australia

Implementation and planning costs totalled A$5.5 million over four years, which required a usage rate of 500 trips per day, or 15,000 per month, for the scheme to break-even. During the first week of operation, the system was used only 253 times. This use rate dropped to only 136 times per day by October 2010, for a total of 20,700 trips, with nearly 650 subscribers.

The low popularity of the scheme in comparison to other cities was attributed to Melbourne's mandatory helmet laws, acknowledged by the government, which recently began subsidising helmet purchases at $5 per helmet from local convenience stores and vending machines. The helmet subsidy added an additional A$5 million to the cost of the bike share programme. After the introduction of subsidised helmets, MBS bicycle usage rate increased to 183 trips per day. This usage rate increased to 283 trips per day (8,500 trips per month) in December 2010, with another increase to 433 trips per day (13,000 per month) by May 2011. Promotional efforts to advertise MBS have been limited, though mobile phone optimised websites have also been created, such as BikeShare.Tel, allowing users to locate stations and see bike availability.

MELTours launched a bicycle tour based on the MBS within a month of launch as a way to enable tourists to see the city using the MBS and to learn how to use it. The tour was designed around the available MBS pods where each leg is no more than 30 minutes in duration, making the cost to the customer as low as possible while still allowing a two-hour activity.

== Technology ==
The platform behind the bike share system was created by 8D Technologies, who also supply the server technology for BIXI Montréal, Citi Bike in New York City, Santander Cycles in London, Capital Bikeshare in Washington DC, and others.

== See also ==
- List of bicycle-sharing systems
