= Russell Mockridge =

Australian cyclist (1928–1958)

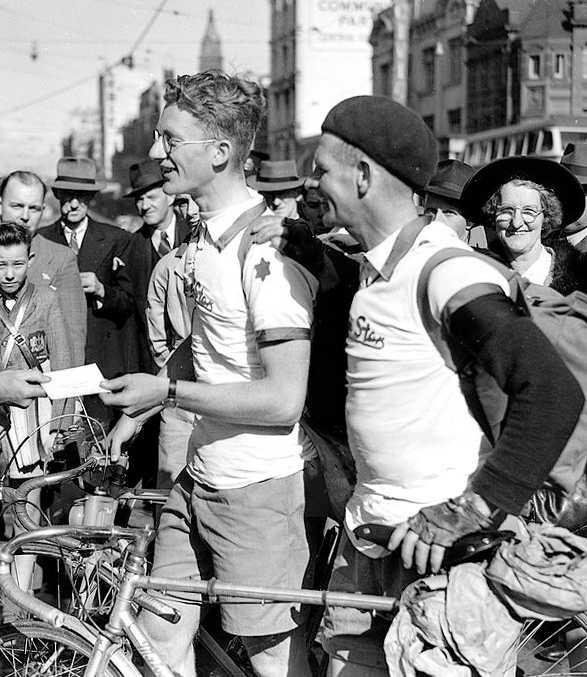
- Russell Mockridge (left) and Hubert Opperman arrive in Sydney from Melbourne in 1948

Personal information
- Full name: Edward Russell Mockridge
- Born: 18 July 1928 Melbourne, Australia
- Died: 13 September 1958 (aged 30) Melbourne, Australia

Cycling career
- Sport: Cycling
- Disciplines: Track & Road
- Role: Rider
Medal record
Representing Australia
Men's track cycling
Olympic Games
Gold medal – first place	1952 Helsinki	1000 m time trial
Gold medal – first place	1952 Helsinki	2000 m tandem
British Empire Games
Gold medal – first place	1950 Auckland	Sprint
Gold medal – first place	1950 Auckland	1000 m time trial
Silver medal – second place	1950 Auckland	Pursuit

Edward Russell Mockridge (18 July 1928 – 13 September 1958) was a racing cyclist from Geelong, Victoria, Australia. He died during a race, in collision with a bus.

== Family ==
The son of Robert Glover Mockridge and Aileen Claire Mockridge, née Riley, Edward Russell Mockridge (known as Russell) was born in Melbourne on 18 July 1928. Mockridge married Irene Pritchard (-2004), widely known as "Rene", in London, in 1953; they had a daughter, Melinda, who was born in Ghent, Belgium in December 1954.

== Career ==
Mockridge started in 1946 by winning his first race of 40 km with Geelong Amateur Cycling Club. For his upper-class accent he was dubbed Little Lord Fauntleroy, but his wins soon earned him the nickname of The Geelong Flyer. He became described as 'Australia's greatest all-round cyclist for all time'.

His ride in the 1948 Summer Olympics road race in London was ruined by two punctures and his team was eliminated in the quarter-final of the 4000 m team pursuit. He represented Australia at the 1950 British Empire Games in Auckland. He took gold in the 1000 m sprint and the 1000m time trial, and silver in the 4000 m pursuit.

In Paris in July 1952 he won the Amateur Grand Prix and the following day the Open Grand Prix, beating world professional champion Reg Harris, becoming first to win both amateur and professional Paris Sprints. His humiliation of the professionals led to amateur riders being barred for many years. Later that year, he won Manchester Wheelers' Club Muratti Cup again beating Reg Harris.

Selection for the 1952 Summer Olympics in Helsinki was in doubt as he refused to sign the Australian Olympic Federation fidelity bond, which demanded he remain amateur for two years after the Games. A great former cyclist, Hubert Opperman, then Federal parliamentarian for Geelong, negotiated a one-year reduction. Mockridge won gold medals in the tandem event with Lionel Cox, and in the 1000 m time trial. He turned professional a year later with success in Europe and Australia. He teamed with Sid Patterson and Reginald Arnold to win the Paris six-day race in 1955. Mockridge was one of 60 of 150 entrants to finish the 1955 Tour de France. He won 12 consecutive Australian championships. He won the Australian national road race title in 1956, 1957 and 1958.

== Death ==
In 1958, aged 30, he was killed by a bus in Melbourne at the Dandenong Rd and Clayton Rd intersection, two miles from the start of the 225 km Tour of Gippsland race.

== Recognition ==
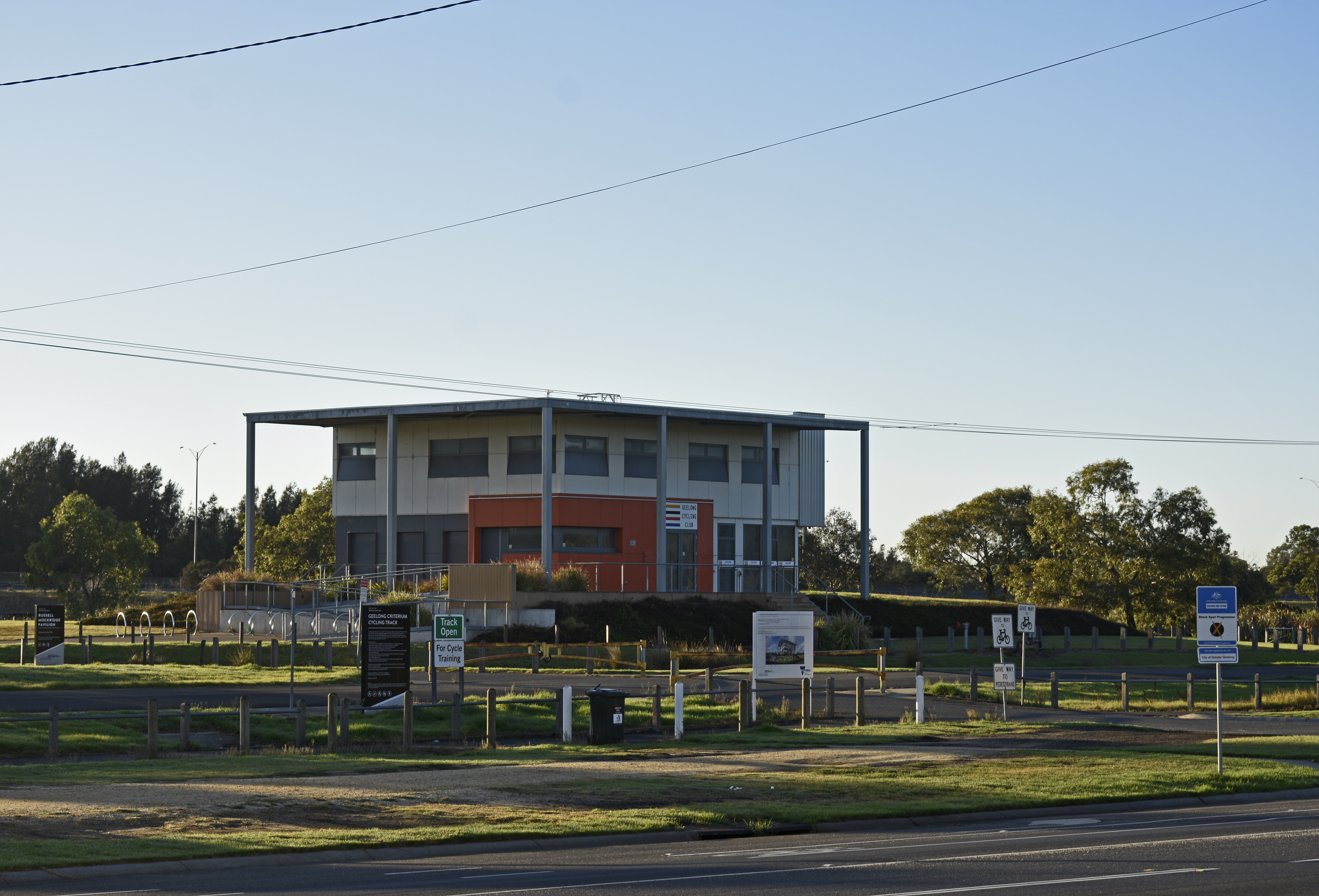
Russell Mockridge Pavilion in Belmont, hosting the Geelong Cycling Club

- In 2015, he was an inaugural Cycling Australia Hall of Fame inductee.
- A velodrome in Camperdown, Victoria was named in his honour.

== See also ==
- Cycling in Geelong
