= Melbourne Critical Mass =

Critical Mass Melbourne is an informal grass roots collection of people who gather to take part in the month's Critical Mass event, which is a cycling event typically held in various cities throughout the world on the last Friday of every month, for traveling as a group through city or town streets on bikes. The rides in Melbourne began in November 1995, and have occurred every month since, with between 100 and 1000 riders involved. Like most Critical Mass events in other cities, the Melbourne rides have fostered the development of a coherent urban cycling community, the focus of which is the temporary intentional community of the rides themselves.

The biggest rides of the year are always held each November to celebrate the birthday of the first ride in Melbourne. These rides are typically five to ten times larger than a normal Critical Mass in Melbourne. This is also a suitable time of year to encourage cycling as the warmer weather arrives.

Rides occur at 6:00pm on the last Friday of every month, with people congregating on the steps of the State Library of Victoria from around 5pm: 37.810031°S 144.964116°E.

== Critical Mass and CityLink 1999–2004 ==
Following its opening in 1999, Critical Mass rode onto CityLink eight times. A policy of facilitated tolerance was adopted by Victoria Police based on history of no previous problems with the Critical Mass rides. This section summarises media reports that occurred after CityLink highlighted the rides in the media, ultimately causing the police to change their policy in 2004.

Critical Mass first crossed the Bolte Bridge in May 1999 before it was opened to traffic a few weeks later.

In June 2003 Critical Mass Melbourne rode through the Burnley Tunnel for the second time. Police Minister Andre Haermeyer said it was up to police to decide how to deal with the protest, "I think everyone has the right to protest and I think most of us accept some modest amount of inconvenience as a trade-off against that democratic right," and added "But this is just an outrageous impediment upon most people wanting to go home on a Friday night, the busiest night of the week. I think they're quite clearly a fringe element. I think they're irresponsible and reckless by taking the protest through the CityLink Tunnel." The Age described the event as a parade moving "peacefully amid a party atmosphere, with blaring music and much cheering". According to their report "Some riders wore silly hats, dressed as clowns and animals and decorated their bikes with stuffed toys and teddy bears." While State Opposition Leader Robert Doyle denounced the tunnel's closure as "political correctness gone mad", a Victoria Police spokeswoman was pleased the action was over quickly.

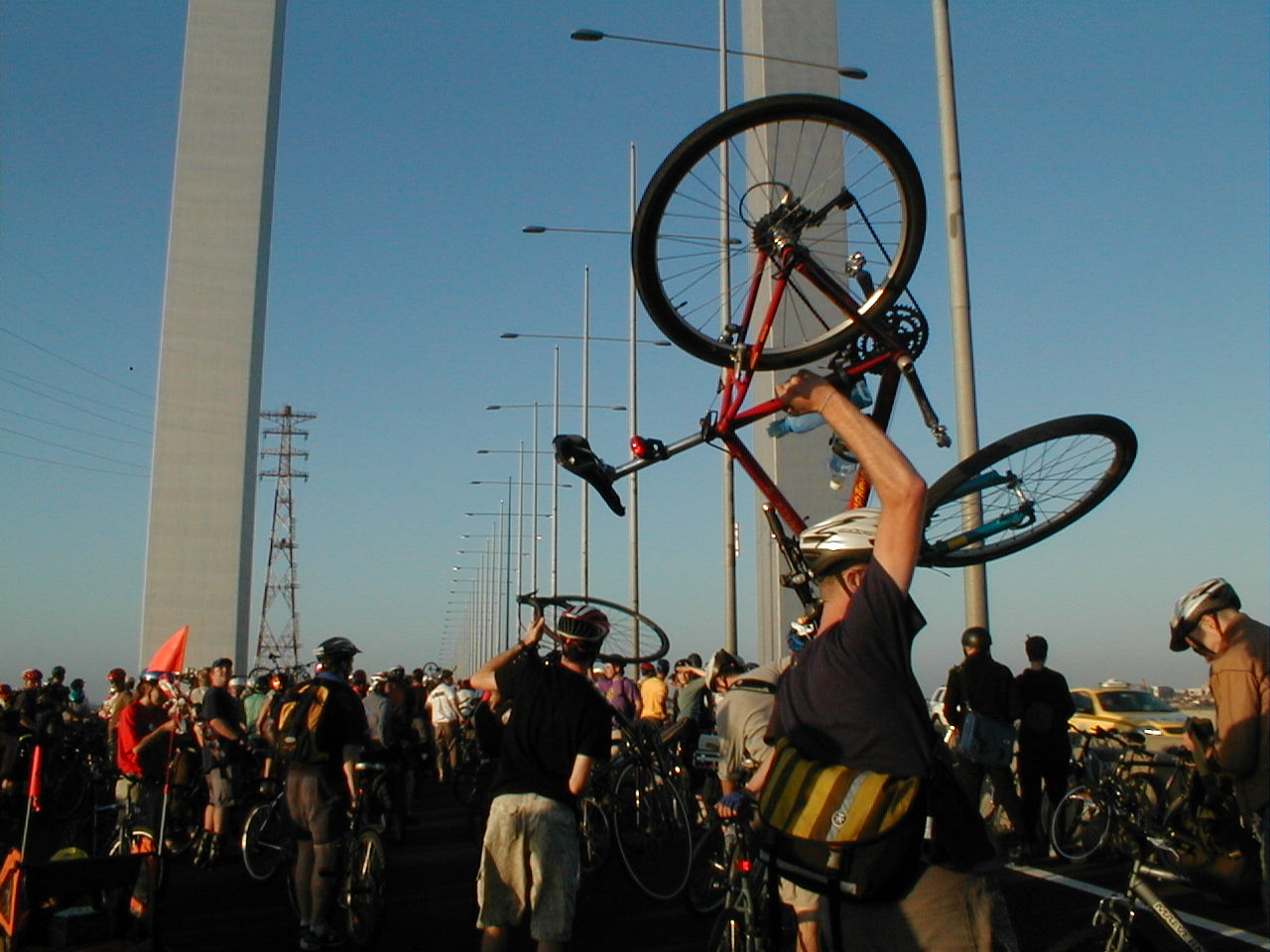
Critical Mass on the Bolte Bridge, 27 February 2004

Cyclists rode over the Bolte Bridge in February 2004 as part of their Critical Mass ride. One of the complaints of Critical Mass is that the Bolte Bridge makes no provision for cycle access, whilst more broadly it further entrenches car and oil dependency. According to a police spokeswoman about 300 cyclists took part in the ride, forcing the closure of northbound lanes on the Bolte Bridge for about 25 minutes shortly after 7 pm. It was reported by the ABC that the protest minimally disrupted traffic.

Transport Minister Peter Batchelor denounced the event, "I think it's counterproductive; I think it works against the best interests of the cycling community," he told the ABC. Acting Police Superintendent Brett Guerin told the Herald Sun "Facilitating protests is always the best option and has proved to work in the past,"

In November 2004 Superintendent Mick Williams bypassed the previous policy of negotiation and facilitation and threatened a crackdown on cyclists using CityLink which prevented Critical Mass from entering the CityLink system. Brian, an environment professional who attended the ride, told the Jon Faine program on ABC radio that the Burnley Tunnel was an appropriate target for such a protest, but routes are decided on the night by the riders "It (the route) is decided on the night by the people who are there. The Burnley Tunnel represents car-only infrastructure development by a private company to serve a public function." He explained further that congestion on Citylink proved the infrastructure was failing and alternative means of transportation needed to gain greater prominence. "It (the ride) has raised the profile of the issue of the under-provision of infrastructure for bicycles and the failings of CityLink." he said.

== A Slow decline ==
Critical Mass continued to gather each month between 2005 and 2014, with a focus on safer cycling and becoming a party on wheels/example of the freedom and enjoyment of cycling. Large infrastructure and major arteries were avoided in the interests of public safety and promoting cycling (and the event) as inclusive and enjoyable for everyone.

After numbers of attendees dropped off during 2015, Critical Mass Melbourne was reduced to a small hardcore group of die-hards. Attempts were made to have a closing ride to celebrate the death of Critical Mass but sufficient attendees could not be mustered. Attendance continued to decline until it reach zero in mid 2015.

Since 2016 new ride was promoted via social networking links and was touted to reappear on 29 January 2016.

== 2022 Revival ==
After a break of a few years, Critical Mass Melbourne rides started again in 2022. Rides are now organised by people involved in Bicycle User Groups around Melbourne with ride routes chosen to promote and advocate for specific bicycle infrastructure in their area. The new format invites state politicians and local city councilors along for the rides and invites them to speak in favour of bicycle infrastructure.
