= St Kilda Cycling Club =

Australian cycling club

- SKCC logo

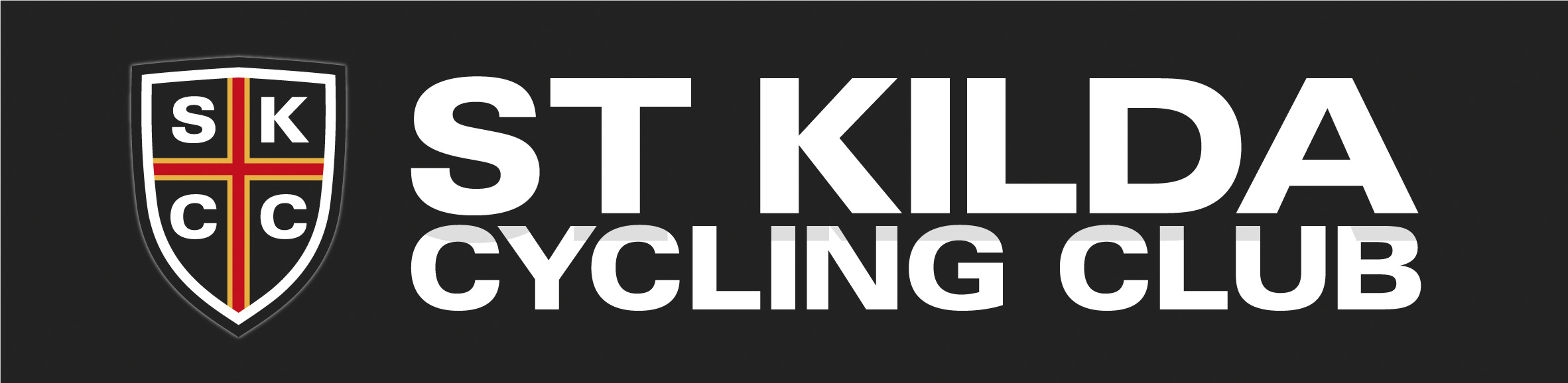
- SKCC Logo
- Founded: 1999
- Founder: name
- Type: Not for profit Organisation
- Purpose: Road Cycling, Road bicycle racing, Criterium and Coffee
- Location: PO Box 420, Elwood Victoria 3184, Australia
- Coordinates: 37°52′14″S 144°58′35″E
- Origins: Road Cycling, Road bicycle racing and Coffee
- Region served: Inner Melbourne
- Method: Training and Education
- Members: c. 1000
- Owner: Not for profit Organisation elected committee
- Key people: President – Evan Rolton Operations Manager – Gaelene Snelling
- Employees: 1
- Volunteers: c. 100
- Website: www.skcc.com.au

The St Kilda Cycling Club, commonly referred to as SKCC, is an Australian cycling club based in inner and south-east Melbourne, Victoria, Australia. The club is part of the international cycling union, the sport's peak body.

The cycling club was established in 1999 and its name originates from the Melbourne suburb of St Kilda, Victoria although its membership base extends beyond the suburban boundaries. The club is a not for profit association formed under the Associations Incorporation Act 1981.

The club is the largest in Australia and has the largest female membership of any Australian cycling club. Former Olympian and current head of the OCC Oceanian Cycling Confederation and current UCI Vice-President Tracey Gaudry is the Number One ticket holder.

== History ==
SKCC was formed in 1999 when a group of local riders saw the need for a local club to service the growing number of cyclist in inner Melbourne.

| President | From | To |
|---|---|---|
| Zeth Romanis | 1999 | 2000 |
| Rene Bueman | 2000 | 2001 |
| Mike Englisch | 2001 | 2002 |
| Dean Langenberg | 2002 | 2003 |
| Ashleigh Smith | 2003 | 2004 |
| Jeff Provan | 2004 | 2007 |
| Mel Jacobsen | 2007 | 2009 |
| Adrian Vlok | 2009 | 2011 |
| Anthony Seipolt | 2011 | 2013 |
| Andrew Goodin | 2013 | 2014 |
| Lee Turner | 2014 | 2017 |
| Evan Rolton | 2017 | 2018 |
| Lewis Fulcher | 2018 | 2021 |
| Campbell Fuller | 2021 | 2022 |
| Tom Reynolds | 2022 | |

== Criterium racing ==
Melbourne's core criterium racing season commences in October each year and runs through to April the following year. A criterium, or crit, is a bike race held on a short course (usually less than 5 km), often run on closed-off city centre streets.

SKCC previously held criteriums in White St, Port Melbourne. Due to the Fisherman's Bend rezoning and the encroachment of residential buildings the club is looking for a new permanent circuit. in 2022 and 2023, the club held criteriums on closed roads at Albert Park Lake in the lead up to the Melbourne F1 Grand Prix. Racing is typically graded from the premier women's and men's events A grade events through to E grade entry-level races. The club also hold races for para-athletes.

== Road racing ==
The road racing seasons commences in April each year and extends through to October.

The road racing calendar consists of handicap and graded racing events run each weekend on closed roads outside the Melbourne metropolitan areas. SKCC is part of a group of seven cycling clubs who work together to organise the winter road racing season. This group of clubs is referred to as the Northern Combine.

== Club jerseys ==
The current SKCC club jersey was designed by Created by South and manufactured by Tinelli. The design was one of three voted on by SKCC members and was released in 2022.

== Club champions ==
=== 2015 Road Championships ===
Men: David Kelly, Daniel Strauss, Christopher Lee
Women: Bridie O'Donnell, Elizabeth Doueal, Clare Morgan
Men's Masters 2/3: Haydn Bradbury, Ryan Vecht, Andrew Clark
Women's Masters 2/3: Katherine Taylor, Sarah Dam
Men's Masters 4/5: Anthony Seipolt, Matthew Kemp, Bruno Rabl
Women's Masters 4/5: Dale Maizels, Annie Mollison, Meredith Clark
Men's 6/7: Peter Hood, Bruce Simons, Robbie Moore
Men's 8+: John Wyatt, George Csefalvay
Junior U19: Hamish Webber
Junior U17: Carter Turnbull

=== 2012 Criterium Championships ===
Men: David Loakes, Aaron Salisbury, Richard Braic
Women: Jenny McPherson, Clare Morgan, Tanya Matthewson
Men's Masters 2/3: David Loakes, Aaron Salisbury, Steve Martin
Masters 4/5: Bill Gordon, Adrian Vlok, Tim McGrath
Masters 6+: Brad Speller, Jeff Provan, Neil Jeffs
Masters Women 2/3:Jenny Macpherson, Clare Morgan, Tanya Matthewson
Masters Women 4/5: Kerrie Baumgartner, Renee Nutbean, Lysiane Belton
Masters Women 6: Philippa Read
Junior Boys J19: Bradley Erickson, Adam McGillivray
Junior Boys J17: Theo Hassan
Junior Boys J15: Sam Byrne
Junior Girls J19: Molly Tilbrook

=== 2011 Criterium Championships ===
Men: Chris Tymms, David Loakes, Andy Naylor
Women: Jenny McPherson, Jane McInnes, Bridget Officer
Masters 4/5: Bill Gordon, Tommy Walker, Peter Bolton
Masters 6+: Chris Salisbury, Gordon Patrick, Brad Speller
Masters Women 2/3:Jane McInnes, Justyna Lubkowski, Hannah Vine
Masters Women 4/5: Fiona Carden, Liz Georgeson
Masters Women 6: Philippa Read, Daylight
Junior Boys J19: Jeremy Nielsen, Justin Cally
Junior Boys J17: Bradley Erickson, Stephen Liley, Adam McGillivray
Junior Boys J15: George O’Donovan
Junior Girls J13: Asha Henriksson

=== 2010 Criterium Championships ===
Men: Rico Rogers, David Loakes, Chris Tymms
Women: Amy Bradley, Mary Rogers, Jane McInnes
Men 35+: Stuart Hill, Jamie Kelly, Ben McGann
Men 45+: Mal Hart, Peter Bolton, Stephen Mayes
Women 35+: Eliza Bergin, Lisa Coutts, Alison Raaymakers
Juniors: James Jones
Handcycling: Stuart Tripp

=== 2010 Road Championships ===
Men: Reece Stephens, Aaron Salisbury, Allan Iacoune
Women: Tanya Matthewson, Eliza Bergin, Lisa Coutts
Men 35+: Aaron Christiansen, Jeremy Hindell, Adam Kliska
Men 45+: Tom Walker, Chris Salisbury, Peter Bolton
Women 35+: Lisa Coutts
Women 45+: Phillipa Read, Sue Brown
Juniors: James Jones

=== 2009 Criterium Championships ===
Men: Robert Crowe, David Loakes, Stuart Hill
Women: Jo Hogan, Freya Cole, Lisa Couts
Men 35+: Robert Crowe, Stuart Hill, Jamie Kelly
Men 45+: Peter Zvedeniuk, Jeff Provan, Graeme Fisher
Juniors: James Jones

=== 2009 Road Championships ===
Men: Sam Rix, Peter Riseley, Wade Wallace
Women's A: Jo Hogan, Alison Raaymakers, Mary Rogers
Men 45+: Jeff Provan, Marcus Balscheit
Women B: Kristin Hendrikksson, Nerissa Stafford, Caitlin Chancellor
Juniors: James Jones

=== 2008 Criterium Championships ===
Men: David Loakes, Robert Crowe, Stuart Hill
Women: Cristine Foster, Emma Colson, Philippa Read
Men 45+: Tom Walker, Peter Zvendeniuk, Michael Day
Juniors: Michael Jeffs, Oscar Kazmanli-Liffen

=== 2008 Road Championships ===
Men: Wade Wallace, Ben Juzwin, James Broadway
Women's: Cristine Foster, Ginger Kidd, Stephanie McGrath
Men 35+: James Broadway
Men 45+: Pete Knight

=== 2007 Criterium Championships ===
Men: Sean Hanneberry, David Loakes, Damon Ginns
Women: Cristine Foster, Sharon Laws, Melinda Jacobsen
Masters: Peter Zvendeniuk, Brad Speller, Alan Nelson

=== 2007 road championships ===
Men: Reece Stephens, James Broadway, Brett Perez
Women: Cristine Foster, Melinda Jacobsen, Philippa Read
Men 30+: Brett Perez, Sam Rix, Wade Wallace
Men 35+: Reece Stephens, James Broadway, Andrew Pike
Men 45+: Pete Knight, Tom Walker, Philip Jenkins
