= Drouin to Warragul Trail =

The Drouin to Warragul Trail or Two Towns Trail is a cycling and walking path between Drouin and Warragul. It is primarily for use by commuters between the two towns. It is eight kilometres long. It was funded by VicRoads.
