= National Ride to Work Day =

Event encouraging people to ride a bike to and from work

National Ride to Work Day also National Ride2Work Day
- Status: Active
- Genre: Commuter cycling social movement
- Frequency: Annually; in October
- Country: Australia
- Inaugurated: 1994
- Previous event: 16 October 2019
- Participants: c. 100,000 nationally
- Organiser: Bicycle Network (Sydney, Melbourne, Hobart, Launceston); City of Adelaide (Adelaide); Bicycle Queensland (Brisbane); Pedal Power ACT (Canberra); City of Darwin (Darwin); Bicycling Western Australia (Perth); North Sydney Council (North Sydney)
- Website: www.ride2work.com.au

The Australian National Ride to Work Day (also National Ride2Work Day) is a commuter cycling social movement and participatory event that encourages commuters to bicycle to and from work. The event is held in October annually at various location in most Australian states and territories. The event is organised by various Australians state and territory bicycle organisations and local government authorities. It is a free event for individuals to register and participate, with registrations over 100,000 in 2010. Workplace bicycle user groups are formed and workplace coordinators are encourage other colleagues to participate. Workplaces are recognised for outstanding participation. Ride2Work was created and trademarked by Bicycle Network in 2008.

== Event synopsis ==
The inaugural event was held in 1994 in Melbourne, organised by the Bicycle Network (then Bicycle Victoria) with 615 cyclists. Since then, the event has grown substantially and this year there was an estimated over 60,000 active participants from all over the country. In October 2006, 10,000 first-time riders and regular commuters registered prior to the event. An estimated 30,000 took part on the day throughout Victoria including sponsorship by more than 1,300 businesses. 34% of those who took up riding in the Victorian event in 2006 were still riding to work five months later.

Nationally, the event features public breakfasts in Adelaide, Brisbane, Canberra, Darwin, Hobart, Launceston, Melbourne (at Federation Square), Perth and Sydney. The event also often includes free massage, helmet hair repair, bike engravings by police, "Spokespersonalities", high-profile ambassadors including CEOs and politicians, prizes and giveaways.

In 2005, up to 6,000 cyclists met at Federation Square to have breakfast as part of Ride to Work Day, double the number from 2004. About 10,000 Victorians are estimated to have left their cars at home in favour of the bike.

== See also ==
- Cycling in Australia
- Walk to Work Day
