= List of hiking trails in Wisconsin =

List of trails

This is an incomprehensive list of hiking trails in the U.S. state of Wisconsin, including multi-purpose biking trails that also function as hiking trails.The list does not include many smaller trails found within places such as Wisconsin state, county or municipal parks.

Most state-owned trails included require a current state trail pass from the Wisconsin DNR for any activities other than hiking, which can be obtained at various vendors around the trails. The current price of a pass is $5 daily, or $25 annually.

Much of Wisconsin's state trail system follows the beds of now-defunct railroad lines; these are known as "rail trails."

== List of trails ==
List of trails
Trail name	Year established	Route	Counties	Trail management	Trail pass needed?	Rail trail?	Length in use (mi)	Notes
400 State Trail	1988	Reedsburg-Elroy	Sauk, Juneau	DNR	Yes	Yes	22	
Ahdawagam Trails	-	Wisconsin Rapids (local)	Wood	Municipal	No	No	21	
Ahnapee State Trail	1970	Sturgeon Bay-Casco; Luxemburg-Kewaunee	Door, Kewaunee	County	No	Yes	48	
Badger State Trail	2000	Madison-Freeport, IL	Green, Dane, Stephenson (IL)	DNR	Yes	Yes	40	
Bearskin State Trail	1973	Minocqua-Harshaw	Oneida	DNR	Yes	Yes	22	
Buffalo River State Trail	1976	Fairchild-Mondovi	Eau Claire, Jackson, Trempeleau, Buffalo	DNR	Yes	Yes	36	
Bugline Trail	1983	Menomonee Falls-Merton	Waukesha	Municipal	No	Yes	16	Paved asphalt trail.
Capital City State Trail	2000	Madison-Fitchburg	Dane	County	Yes	No	17	Local trail.
Cattail State Trail	1999	Amery-Almena	Polk, Barron	County	No	Yes	18	
Chippewa River State Trail	1985	Eau Claire-Durand	Eau Claire, Dunn, Pepin	DNR	Yes	Yes	30	
Devil's River State Trail	2003	Denmark-Rockwood	Brown, Manitowoc	County	No	Yes	15	Eight miles acquired, but not yet in use.
Eisenbahn State Trail	2003	Eden-West Bend	Fond du Lac, Washington	County	No	Yes	25	
Elroy-Sparta State Trail	1965	Elroy-Sparta	Juneau, Monroe	DNR	Yes	Yes	32	
Fox River State Trail	1991	Hilbert-Green Bay	Brown, Calumet	County	Yes	Yes	25	Near the Fox River (Green Bay tributary).
Fox River Trail	-	Pewaukee-Brookfield	Waukesha	County	No	No	3	Near the Fox River (Illinois River tributary), not to be confused with the state trail of the same name.
Friendship State Trail	2000	Brillion-Forest Junction	Calumet	County	No	Yes	4	
Gandy Dancer State Trail	1989	St. Croix Falls-Superior	Polk, Burnett, Douglas	County	Yes	Yes	62	
Glacial Drumlin State Trail	1984	Waukesha-Cottage Grove	Waukesha, Jefferson, Dane	DNR	Yes	Yes	52	
Great River State Trail	1985	Onalaska-Marshland	La Crosse, Trempeleau	DNR	Yes	Yes	24	
Great Sauk State Trail	2017	Sauk City - Sumpter	Sauk, Juneau	County	Yes	Yes	5	
Green Circle State Trail	1992	Stevens Point area (local)	Portage	County	No	No	31	
Hank Aaron State Trail	1996	Milwaukee-West Allis	Milwaukee	DNR	No	Yes	12	
Hillsboro State Trail	1988	Hillsboro-Union Center	Vernon, Juneau	County	Yes	Yes	4	
Ice Age Trail	1988	Statewide	30 counties statewide	Varied	No	Varies	674	Longest hiking trail fully in the state, comprising various surface materials and trailbed locations.
La Crosse River State Trail	1978	La Crosse-Sparta	La Crosse, Monroe	DNR	Yes	Yes	22	
Lake Country Trail	-	Oconomowoc-Pewaukee	Waukesha	Municipal	No	Yes	15	Paved asphalt trail.
Lake Michigan State Water Trail	2012	Lake Michigan shoreline	Several	Varied	No	No	N/A	
Mascoutin Valley State Trail	1996	Ripon-Berlin; Rosendale-Fond du Lac	Fond du Lac, Green Lake, Winnebago	County	No	Yes	21	The trail comprises two disconnected sections.
MECCA Trails	1973	Mercer (local)	Iron	Private Board	No	No	15	Local trails designed for cross-country skiing, meant as a component of area tourism.
Military Ridge State Trail	1981	Fitchburg-Dodgeville	Dane, Iowa	DNR	Yes	Yes	40	
Mound View State Trail	1974/2018	Belmont-Platteville	Lafayette, Grant	County	No	Partial	7	
Mountain-Bay State Trail	1993	Wausau-Green Bay	Marathon, Shawano, Brown	County	No	Yes	83	
New Berlin Trail	1984	New Berlin-Waukesha	Waukesha	County	No	No	7	Paved asphalt trail.
Newton Blackmour State Trail	2003	New London-Seymour	Outagamie	County	Yes	Yes	22	One mile acquired, but not yet in use.
Nicolet State Trail	1999	Gillett-Tipler (Michigan state line)	Oconto, Forest, Florence	County	No	Yes	89	
North Country Trail	2001	N/A	Douglas, Bayfield, Ashland, Iron	Varied	No	No	140	The National Scenic Trail spans Northern Wisconsin, from Minnesota to Michigan's upper peninsula.
Oak Leaf Trail	various	N/A	Milwaukee	County	No	No	135	The trail system spans Milwaukee County. It includes the Menomonee, Kinnickinnic, Root River, Oak Creek, South Shore, Milwaukee River and Zip Lines, along with the Bradley and Drexel Connectors, and Lake Park and Whitehall Park Loops. A portion of the system is Yes.
Oconto River State Trail	1997	Oconto-Stiles Junction	Oconto	County	No	Yes	8	
Old Abe State Trail	1990	Chippewa Falls-Cornell	Chippewa	County	Yes	Yes	20	
Pecatonica State Trail	1974	Belmont-Calamine	Lafayette, Grant	County	Yes	Yes	10	
Red Cedar State Trail	1973	Menomonie-Dunn	Dunn	DNR	Yes	Yes	15	
Saunders State Trail	1991	Boylston Junction-Dewey (Minnesota State Line)	Douglas	County	No	Yes	8	
Stower Seven Lakes State Trail	2003	Amery-Dresser	Polk	County	Yes	Yes	14	
Sugar River State Trail	1972	New Glarus-Broadhead	Green	DNR	Yes	Yes	24	
Tomorrow River State Trail	1996	Plover-Manawa	Portage, Waupaca	County	Yes	Yes	29	A short unfinished section of trail exists just east of Amherst Junction.
Tuscobia State Trail	1966	Park Falls-Rice Lake	Price, Sawyer, Washburn, Barron	DNR/County	No	Yes	75	
Wau-King Trail		Waupaca-King	Waupaca	County	No	No	4	Mainly paved asphalt trail.
White River State Trail	1999	Elkhorn-Lyons; Burlington-Kansasville	Walworth, Racine	County	Yes	Yes	19	Eleven miles acquired, but not yet in use.
Wild Goose State Trail	1986	Fond du Lac-Clyman Junction	Fond du Lac, Dodge	County	No	Yes	34	
Wild Rivers State Trail	1993	Rice Lake-Solon Springs	Barron, Washburn, Douglas	County	No	Yes	104	One mile acquired, but not yet in use
Wiouwash State Trail	1992	Oshkosh-Hortonville; Split Rock-Aniwa	Winnebago, Outagamie, Shawano, Waupaca	County	No	Yes	41	
Wolf River State Trail	2003	Crandon-White Lake	Langlade, Forest	County	No	Yes	37	Six miles acquired, but not yet in use

== See also ==
- List of bike trails in Wisconsin
- National Trails System
- North Country Trail by state
