= 400 State Trail =

Rail trail in Southern Wisconsin

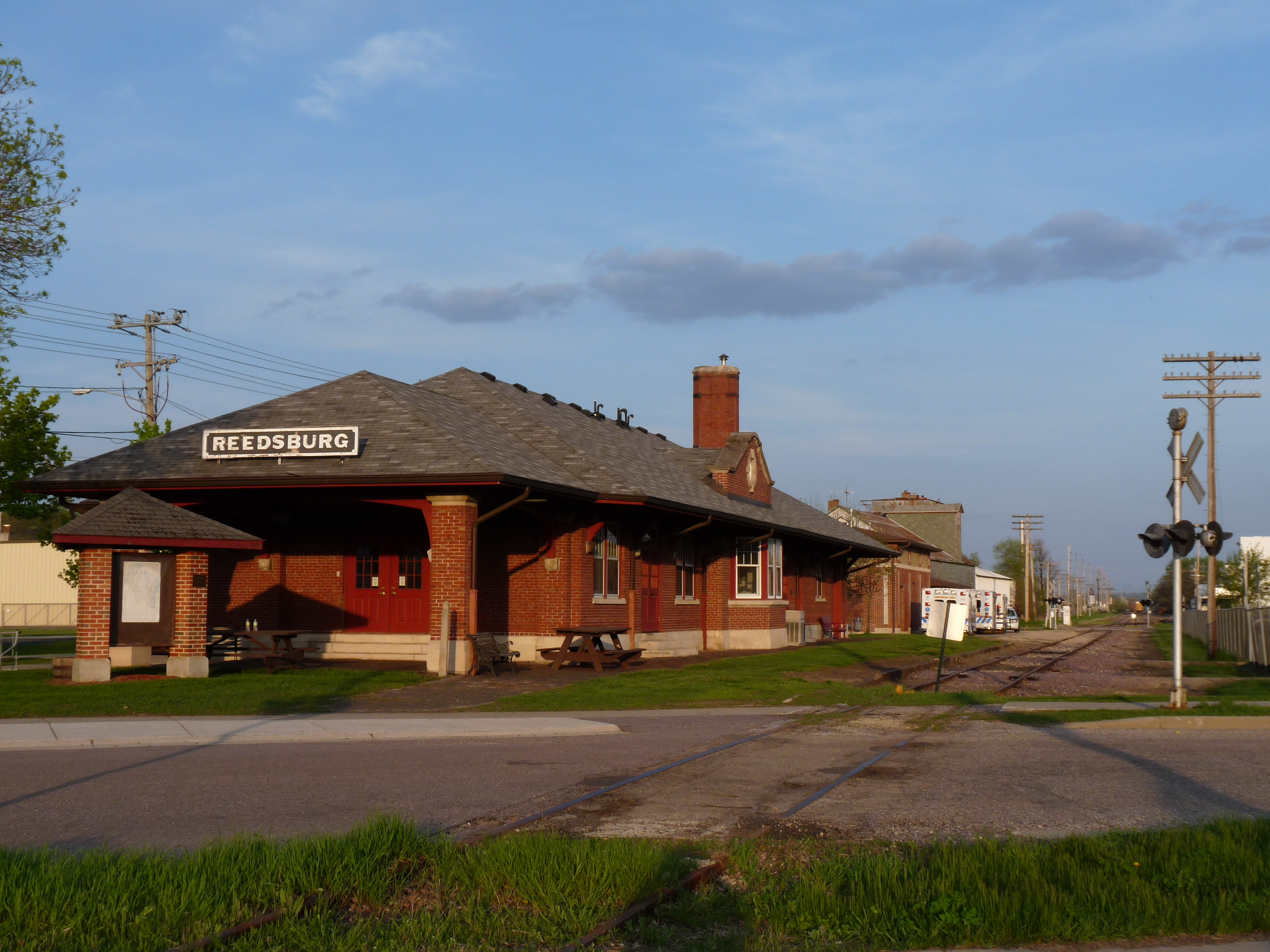
- 400 State Trail headquarters in the historic Chicago and Northwestern Depot in Reedsburg, Wisconsin
- Length: 22 mi (35 km)
- Location: Wisconsin, USA
- Designation: multi-use
- Trailheads: Reedsburg, Wisconsin and Elroy, Wisconsin
- Difficulty: easy
- Season: May through October
- Surface: crushed limestone
- Right of way: Reedsburg Subdivision
- Maintained by: Wisconsin Department of Natural Resources

400 State Trail
- 400 State Trail

The 400 State Trail is a 22-mile (35 km) rail trail between Reedsburg and Elroy, Wisconsin. It is designed for foot, bicycle, equestrian, snowmobile traffic. It is designated as a multi-use trail, offering recreational access to the routes, and is open to the public.

== History ==
The original railway was constructed from Madison, Wisconsin to Winona, Minnesota, starting in 1870, by a predecessor of the Chicago and North Western Railway, the Baraboo Air Line Railroad. It was so named because of the straightness of the Air-line railroad route. The railway became the route of the Minnesota 400, a named train of the C&NW that connected Chicago with Southern Wisconsin and Southern Minnesota. It eventually became the route of the South Dakota destined Dakota 400. The "400" trains of the C&NW were related to the C&NW flagship high-speed Twin Cities 400, which met the Minnesota 400 at Wyeville.

The State of Wisconsin acquired the railway after it was abandoned by C&NW in 1988. After renovations, they opened the trail in 1993. The trail's surface is crushed limestone. The 400 Trail is one of four connecting bike trails in west-central Wisconsin that spans approximately one-third of the state. The trail is known for its rural scenery of the Baraboo River which it crosses eleven times. It is part of the larger Wisconsin Bike Trail System, operated by the state of Wisconsin.

The five mile spur west to Hillboro, known as the Hillsboro State Trail, was formerly the Hillsboro and Northeastern Railway. It joins the 400 State Trail just south from Union Center.

== Connecting trails ==
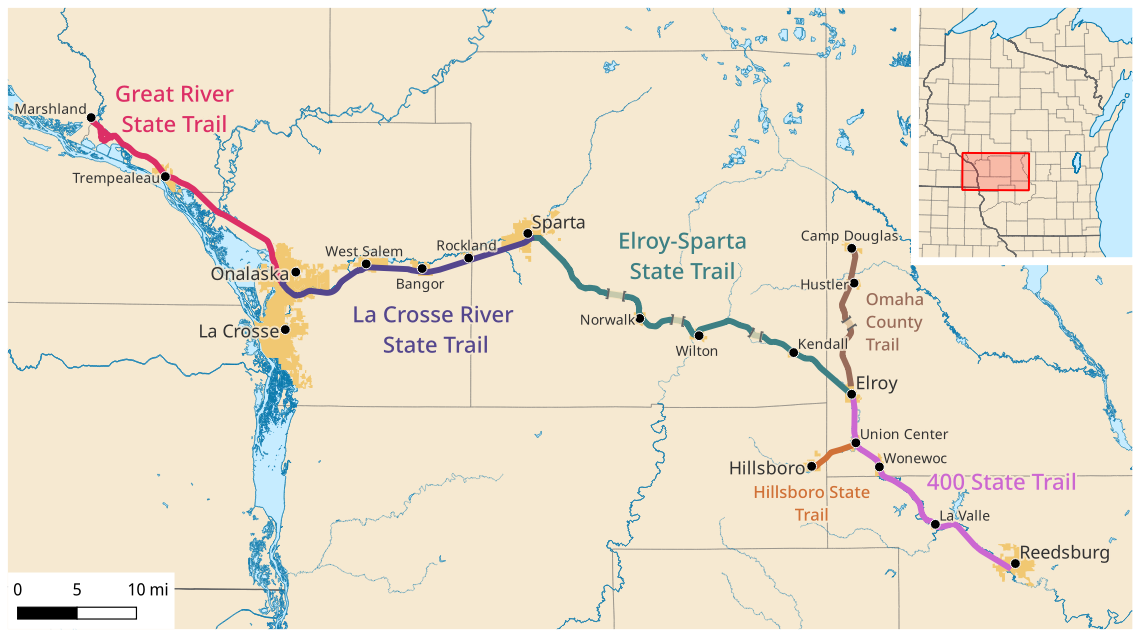
Map of the 400 State Trail and connecting trails

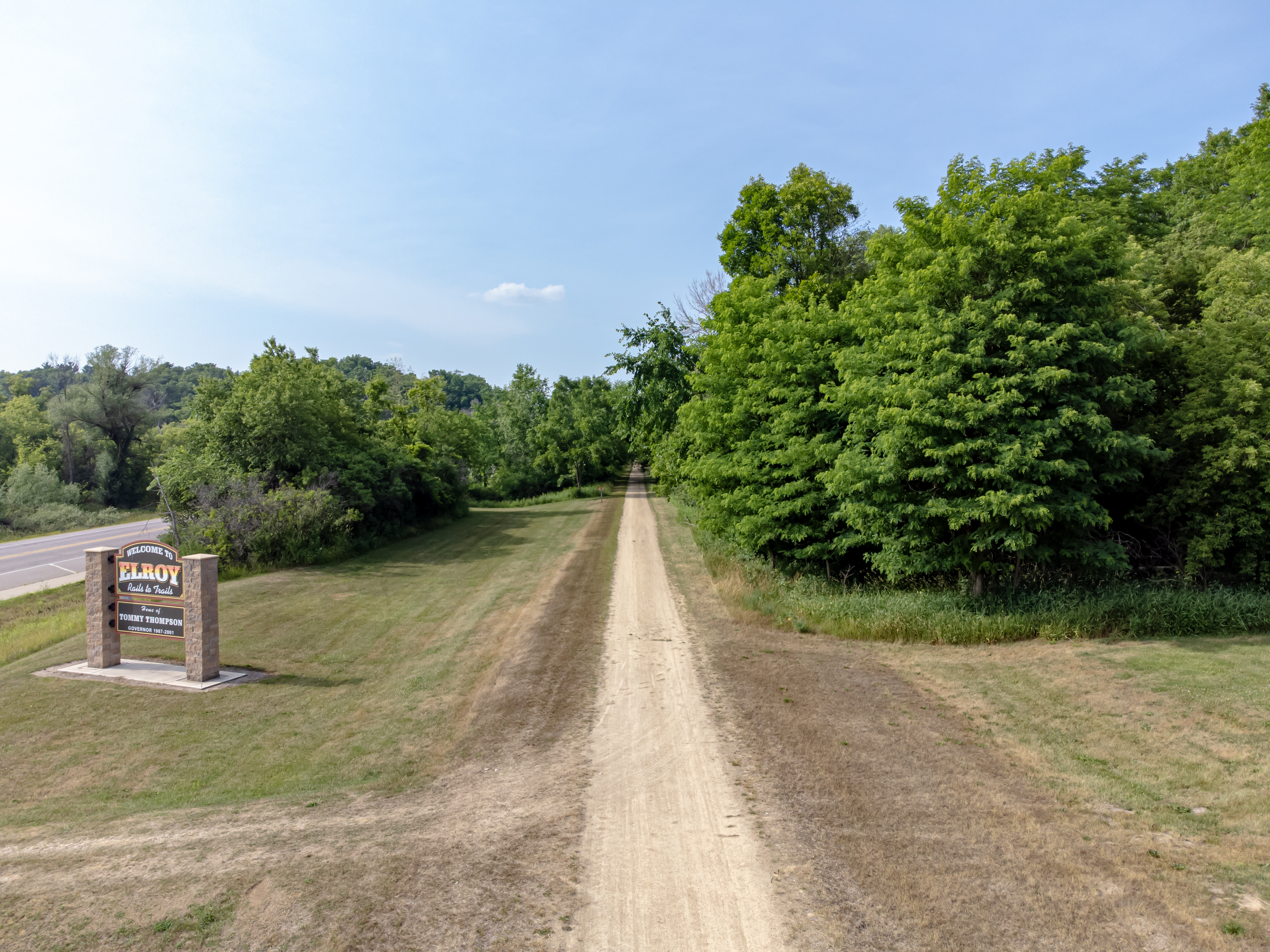
400 State Trail Elroy, Wisconsin

The four connecting west central Wisconsin trails, known as the Bike 4 Trails, going from southeast to northwest are:

- 400 State Trail (22 mi or 35 km)
- Hillsboro State Trail
- the Elroy-Sparta State Trail (32 mi or 51 km)
- La Crosse River Trail (22 mi or 35 km)
- Great River Trail (24 mi or 39 km)

The 400 State Trail connects to the Elroy-Sparta State Trail in Elroy.

The trail headquarters is located in a historic depot in Reedsburg and is open from May 1 through October 31. There is a $5.00 per day fee for use of the trail if one does not have the $25.00 yearly Wisconsin bike trail pass. Bike lights are advisable even on the brightest summer days when going into the long unlit tunnels. Camping, lodging, food, parking, bike rentals and information are available at many points along the trail.

== See also ==
- List of rail trails
- What is a rail trail
- List of hiking trails in Wisconsin
- List of bike trails in Wisconsin
