= Reedsburg Subdivision =

Rail line operated by Wisconsin and Southern

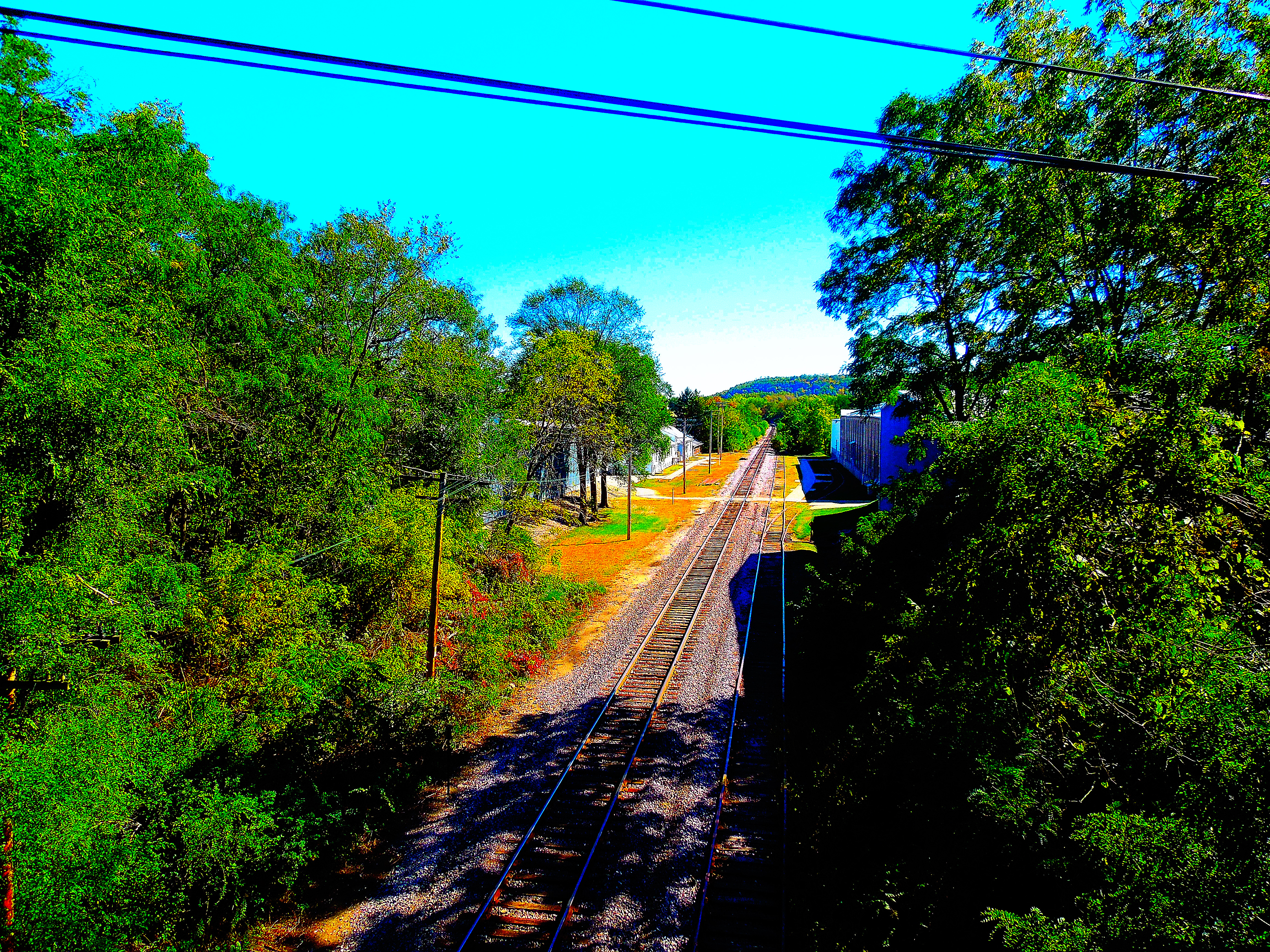
- The Reedsburg Subdivision in Lodi, Wisconsin, in 2012

Overview
- Owner: Wisconsin and Southern Railroad; City of Fitchburg; Village of Oregon
- Termini: Reedsburg; Evansville

Service
- Operator(s): Wisconsin and Southern Railroad

History
- Opened: 15 August 1854

Technical
- Line length: 75 mi (121 km)
- Track gauge: 1,435 mm (4 ft 8 1/2 in) standard gauge

The Reedsburg Subdivision is a railway line in the state of Wisconsin. It runs 75 miles (121 km) from Reedsburg, Wisconsin, to Evansville, Wisconsin, via Madison, Wisconsin. The line was built by predecessors of the Chicago and North Western Railway between 1854 and 1873. As the Madison Subdivision, it ran between Harvard, Illinois, and Sparta, Wisconsin. Ownership of the line is split between the Union Pacific Railroad and the municipalities of Fitchburg, Wisconsin, and Oregon, Wisconsin; the Wisconsin and Southern Railroad provides freight service over the line.

== History ==
The Beloit and Madison Railroad's original line opened between Beloit, Wisconsin, and Footville, Wisconsin, on December 18, 1854. This was further extended to Madison, Wisconsin, on September 7, 1864. Under lease since 1864, the Beloit and Madison was merged into the Chicago and North Western Railway in 1871.

In 1870, the Baraboo Air Line Railroad began building northwest from Madison toward Winona Junction, near La Crosse, a distance of 129 miles (208 km). The Chicago and North Western acquired the company on March 10, 1871, with the line still incomplete. Three tunnels were dug between Elroy and Sparta, at "great expense and with much difficulty." The full line opened in 1873. At Winona Junction, it connected with the line of the LaCrosse, Trempealeau and Prescott Railroad to reach Winona, Minnesota.

In 1911, the North Western opened the Adams Cutoff, a new line between Milwaukee, Wisconsin, and Sparta. The new line shortened the distance between Milwaukee and Minneapolis, and avoided the difficult grades of the original route between Elroy and Sparta. The North Western abandoned that part of the line altogether in 1964 and it was converted into the Elroy-Sparta State Trail. In 1986, the North Western abandoned the line between Elroy and Reedsburg. It is now the 400 State Trail.

The Union Pacific Railroad acquired the Chicago and North Western in 1995. The following year, the Wisconsin and Southern Railroad leased the line between Madison and Reedsburg. When Union Pacific sought to abandon 15 miles (24 km) between Madison and Evansville in 1998, the municipalities of Oregon and Fitchburg acquired the line. The Wisconsin and Southern leased that portion of the line as well in 2014.
