= Elroy-Sparta State Trail =

State Trail in Wisconsin

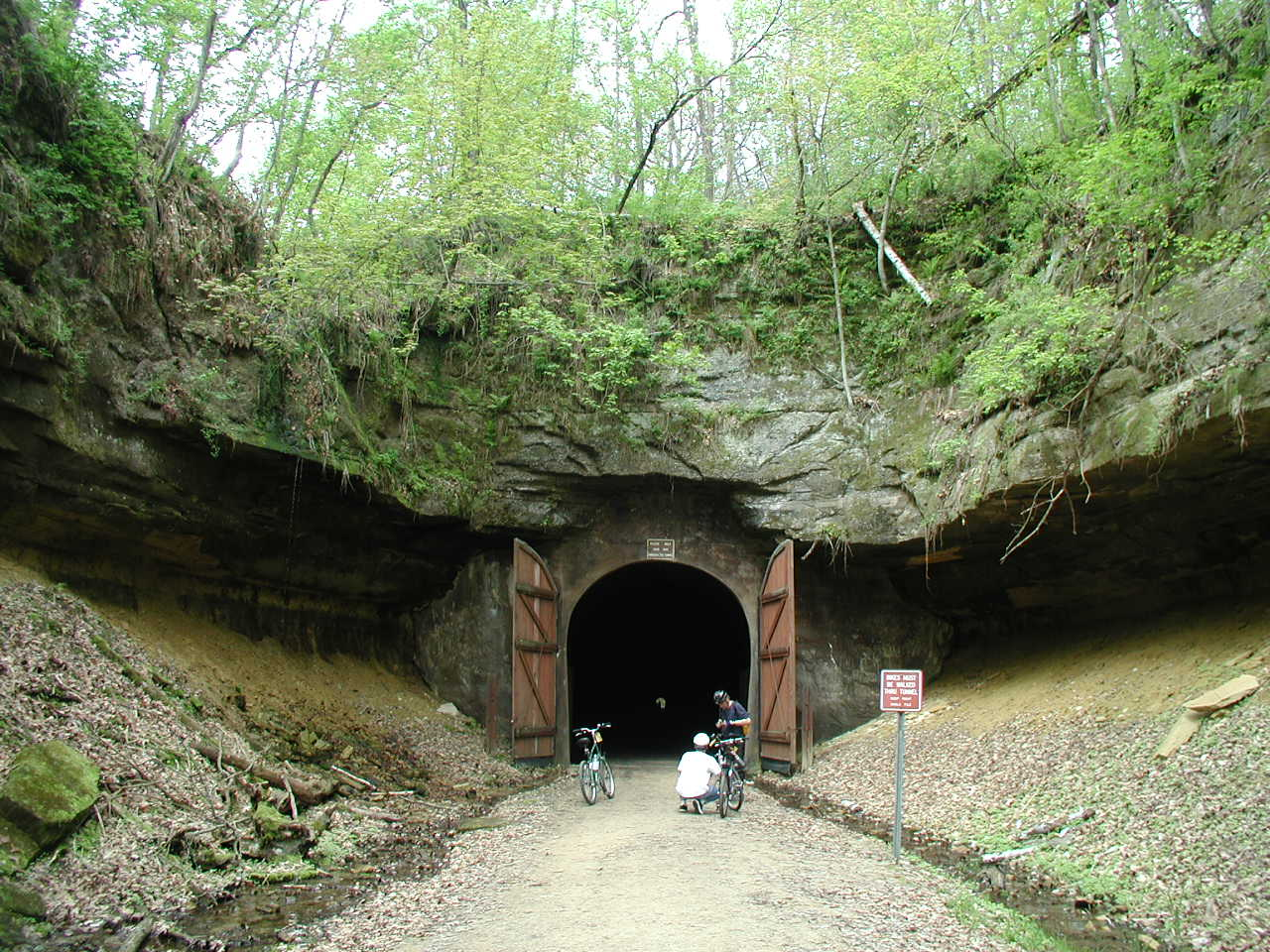
- Just outside one of three railroad tunnels along the Elroy-Sparta State Trail
- Length: 32.5 mi (52.3 km)
- Location: Wisconsin, USA
- Established: 1967
- Designation: multi-use
- Trailheads: Elroy, Wisconsin and Sparta, Wisconsin
- Use: Pedestrian, Biking (fee), Snowmobile, Skiing
- Elevation change: 194 ft (59 m)
- Highest point: 978 ft (298 m)
- Lowest point: 784 ft (239 m)
- Grade: 3%
- Difficulty: easy
- Season: May through October
- Months: 6
- Sights: tunnels
- Hazards: tunnels not lit, lights required
- Surface: crushed limestone
- Right of way: Reedsburg Subdivision
- Maintained by: Wisconsin Department of Natural Resources
- Website: https://dnr.wi.gov/topic/parks/name/elroysparta/

Elroy-Sparta State Trail

The Elroy-Sparta State Trail is a 32.5-mile (52.3 km) Wisconsin State rail trail between Elroy and Sparta, Wisconsin. Considered to be the first rail trail when it opened in 1967, it was designed for foot, bicycle, equestrian and light motorized traffic. Designated a multi-use trail, it offers recreational access to the routes and is open to the public. The trail is part of the larger Wisconsin bike trail system operated by the state of Wisconsin. It passes through rural scenery and three tunnels. It is one of six connecting trails in west-central Wisconsin. It was added to the Rails-to-Trails Conservancy hall of Fame in September 2008. It is one of the most popular trails in Wisconsin.

== History ==
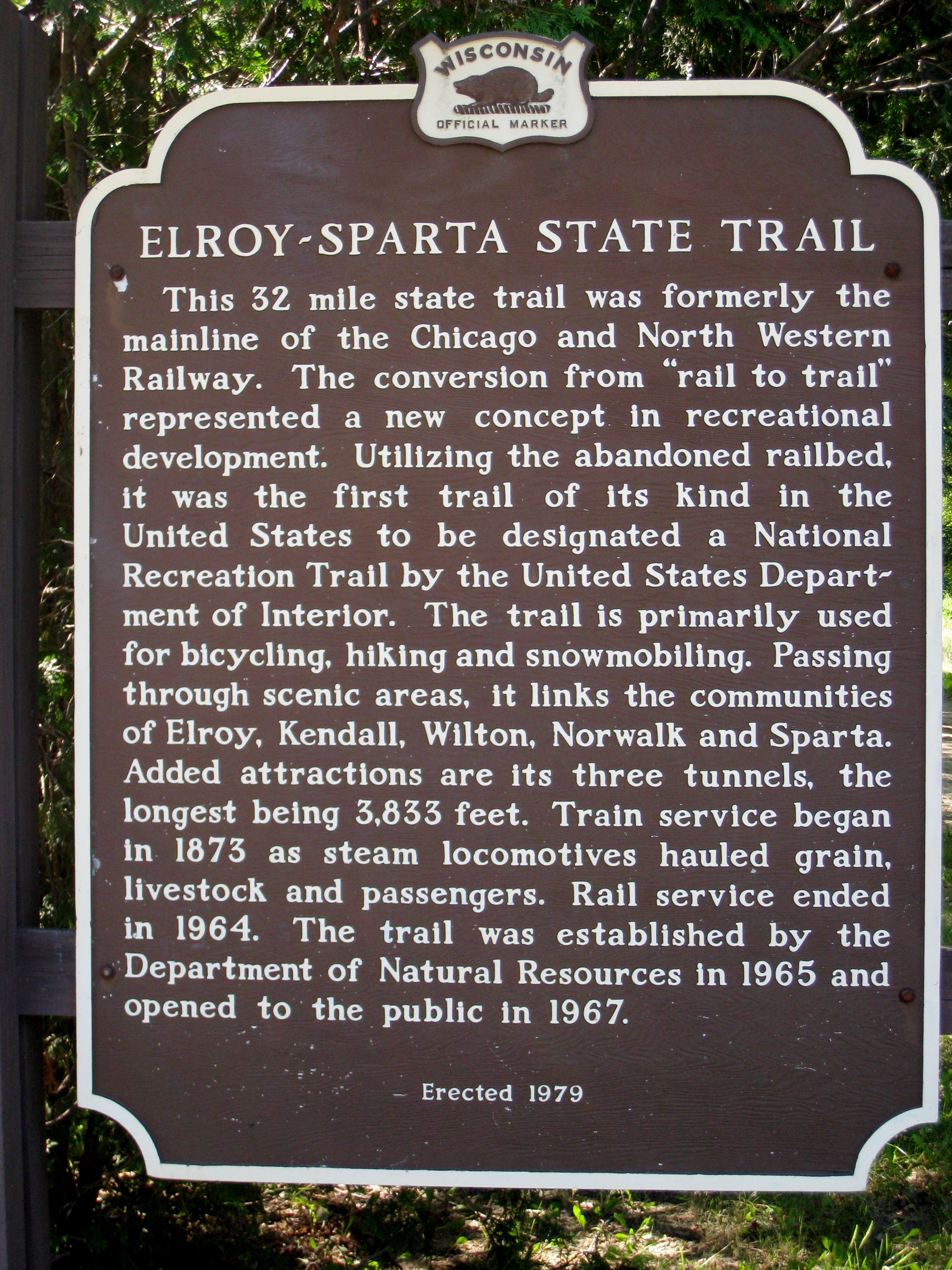
Historical marker along the trail

The original railway was constructed from Madison, Wisconsin to Winona, Minnesota, starting in 1870, by a predecessor of the Chicago and North Western Railway, the Baraboo Air Line Railroad. It was so named because of the straightness of the Air-line railroad route. The ridges between Elroy and Sparta were tunneled at great expense and with much difficulty. The Baraboo Air Line was consolidated with the C&NW in 1872. The Baraboo Air-Line Rail Road connected to the LaCrosse, Trempealeau & Prescott Railroad at Winona Junction and opened for traffic in September 1873, through to Winona, Minnesota. In 1874, the C&NW reported an expenditure for its three tunnels of $476,743.32 and for the construction of 129 miles of railroad between Madison and Winona Junction of $5,342,169.96.

By 1911, the Chicago and North Western completed a new route from Adams to Sparta through Wyeville, called the Adams Cutoff, which avoided the steep grades of the Elroy to Sparta cutoff. In 1964 the Chicago and North Western was permitted to abandon the stretch from Elroy to Sparta. The Wisconsin Conservation Commission, the forerunner of the Wisconsin Department of Natural Resources, purchased the trail property for $12,000. The trail came into use in 1967. The commission learned that 40% of the users were bicyclists, who required a smoother road. The trail was surfaced with screened limestone, and the bridges received planking by 1970. The trail was made part of the National Trails system in 1971.

== Trail ==
The trail, constructed upon the abandoned Chicago and North Western Railway railroad bed, is covered with crushed limestone for a smooth ride for bicyclists. The three tunnels along the trail are impressive feats of nineteenth-century railroad engineering. Tunnel 1, a short distance from Kendall, is surrounded by natural tunnels formed by the surrounding canopy of trees. Tunnel 2, located halfway between Wilton and Norwalk, features 20-foot-tall (6.1 m) wooden doors on both ends of the tunnel. Both Tunnels 1 and 2 are a 1/4 mile (400 m) each. Tunnel 3, nine miles (14 km) from Sparta and three miles (5 km) from Norwalk, is longer than the length of ten football fields at 3/4 mile (1.2 km).

=== Seasonal closing ===
The tunnels are closed for the season by the beginning of November, using the doors that the railroad added to prevent storm damage. The debate on when to close the tunnel caused a conflict between the U.S. Fish and Wildlife Service and the organizers of the Rails to Trails Marathon. The northern long-eared bat hibernates in Tunnel Number three. It was listed as threatened species in 2015. The Rails to Trails Marathon, a Boston Marathon qualifier, moved their event date to earlier in October from November in 2017 to accommodate an earlier tunnel closing than the original November 15 date.

=== Location ===
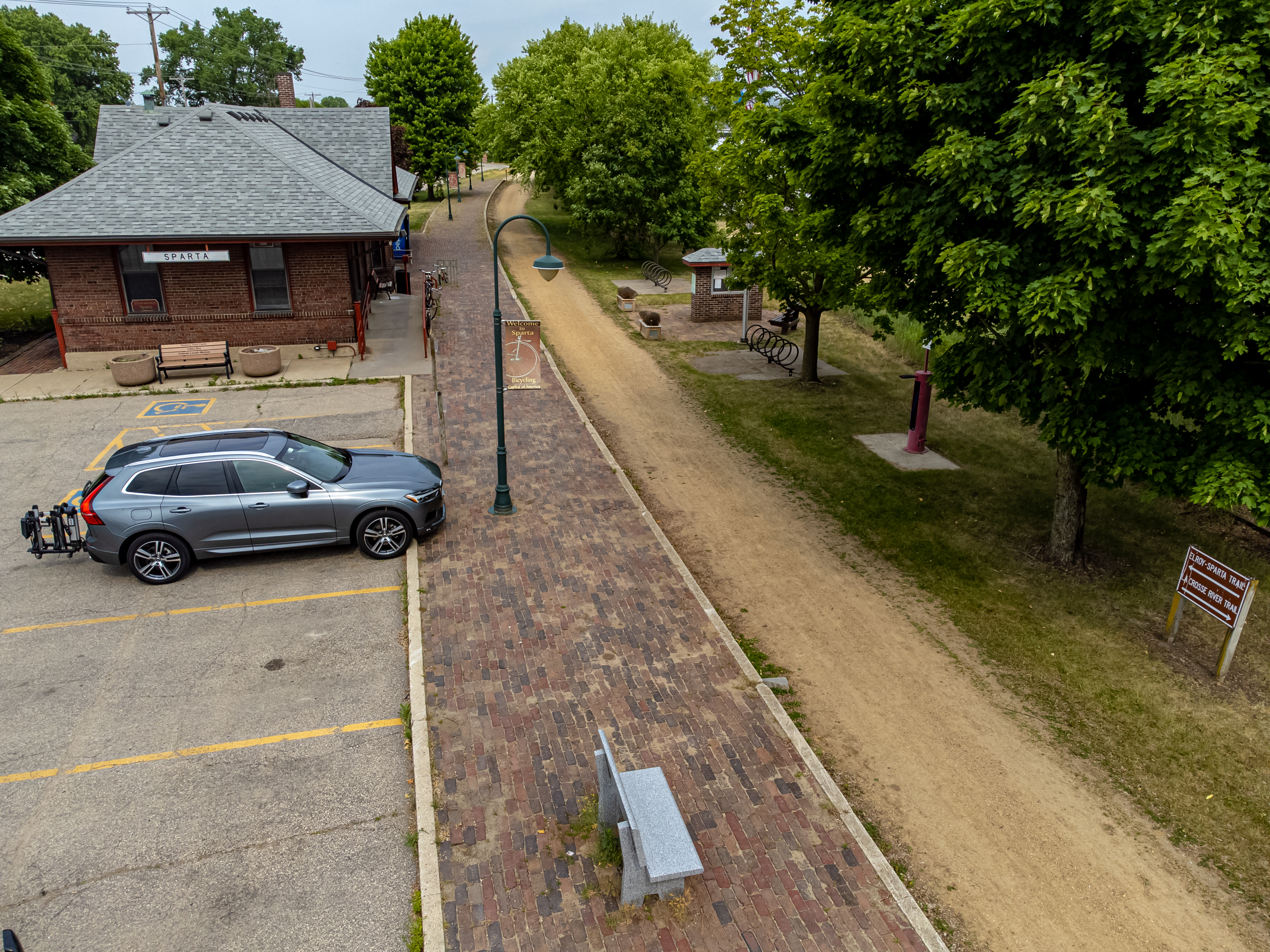
Sparta trails start

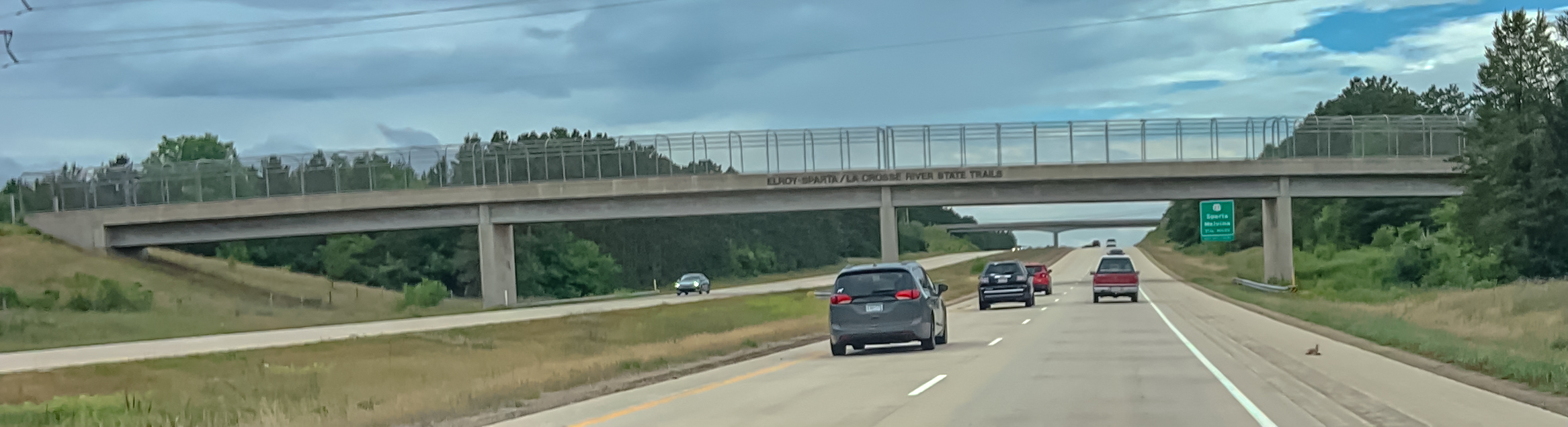
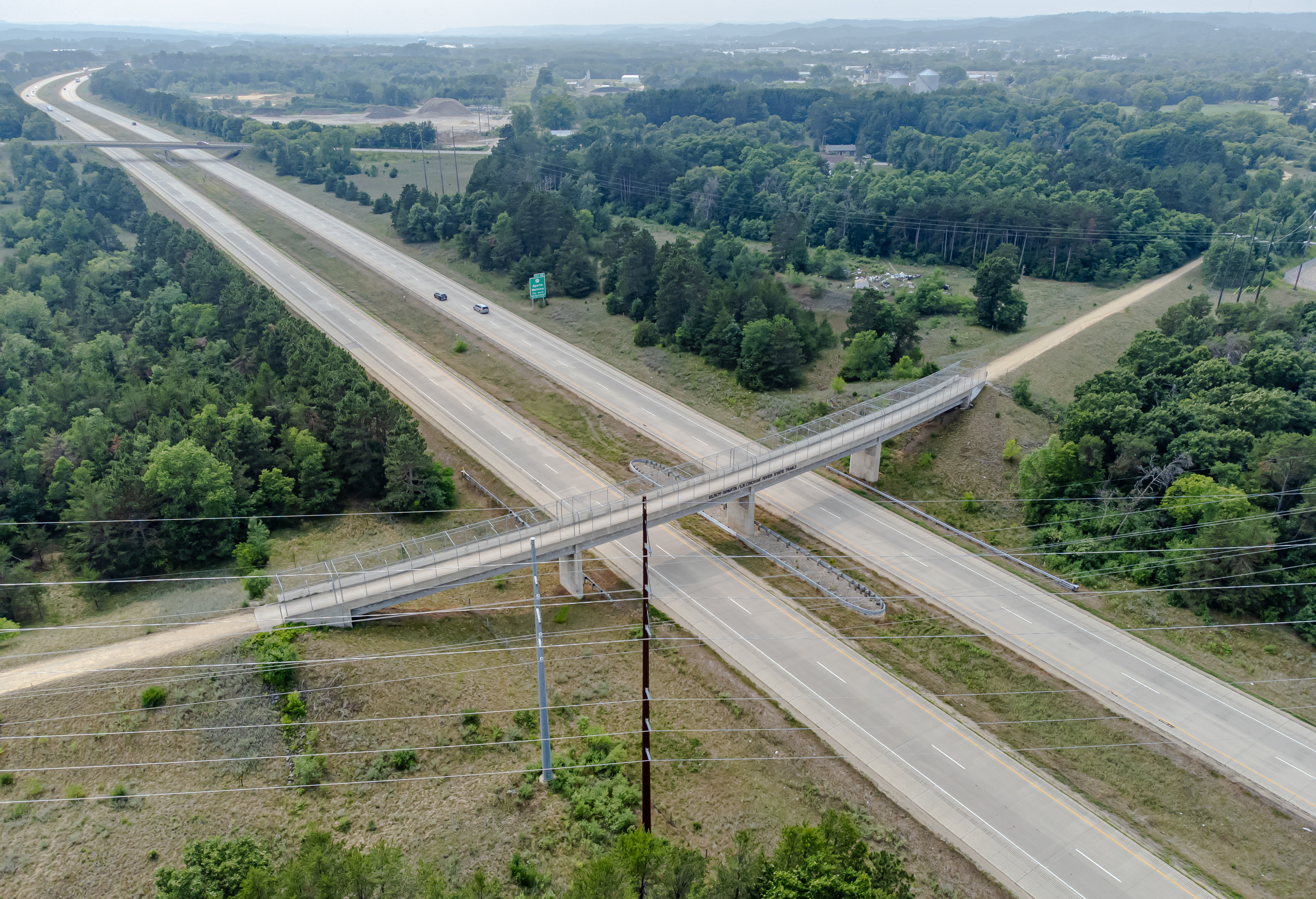
Trail bridge over I-90

The eastern end of the trail is on WIS 80 just north of WIS 71 in downtown Elroy (43°44′34″N 90°16′23″W), while the western end is at the intersection with the La Crosse River Trail on John St. in Sparta (43°55′55″N 90°47′50″W). The trail headquarters, located in Kendall on Wisconsin Highway 71, is open from May 1 through October 31. There is a fee for use of the trail if one does not have an annual Wisconsin trail pass. Camping, lodging, food, parking, bike rentals and information are available at many points along the trail. Lights are required for the tunnels. Bikers should walk bikes through the tunnels.

== West Central Wisconsin Trails ==
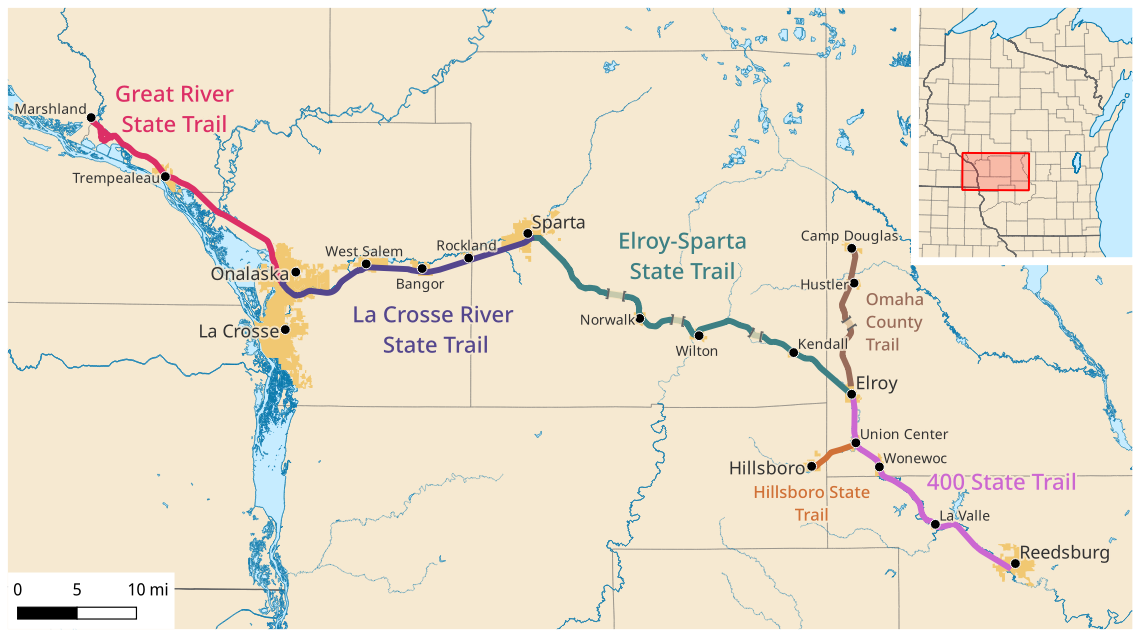
Map of the Elroy-Sparta State Trail and connecting trails

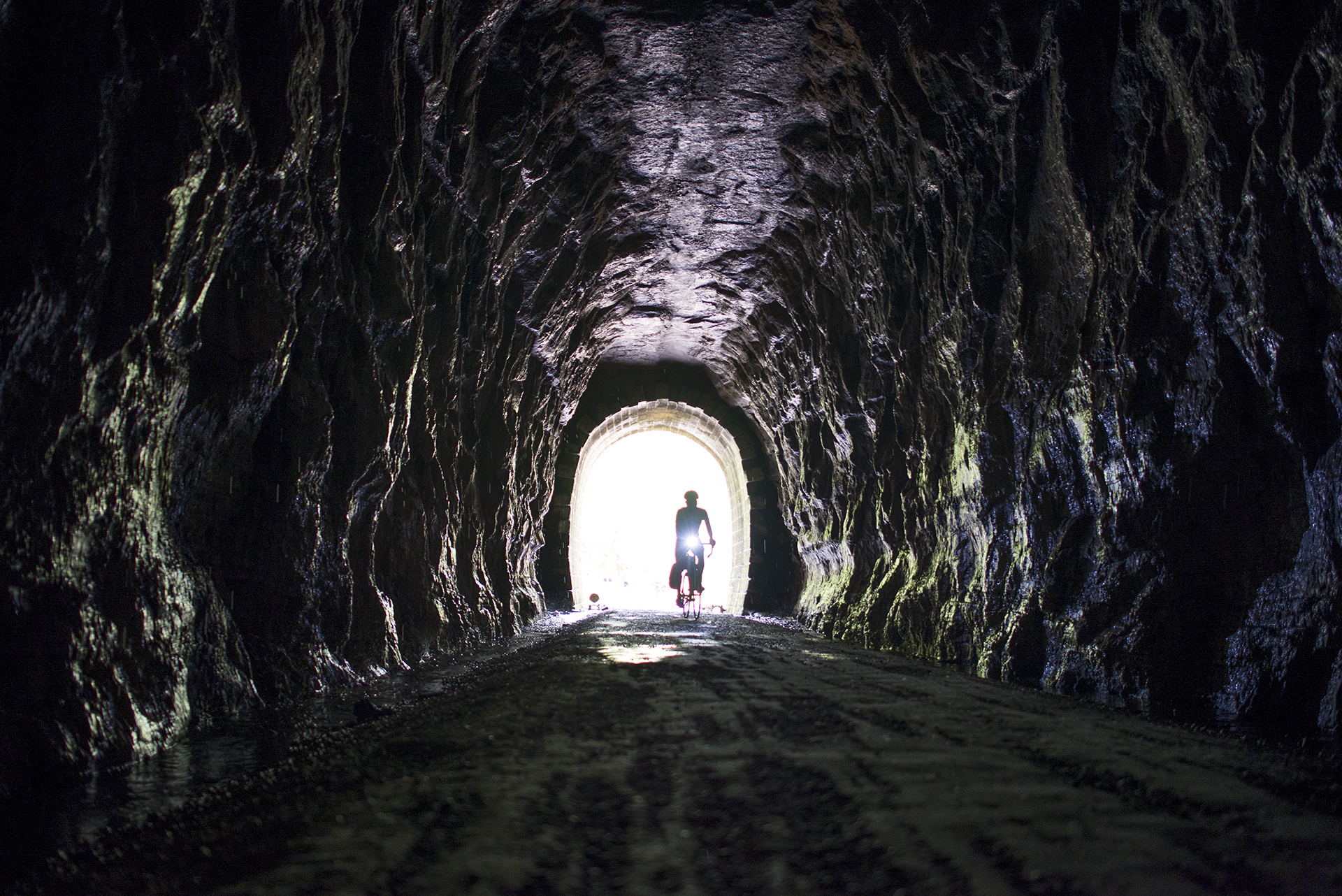
A bicyclist enters one of the tunnels. Note that bikers are required to walk bikes through the tunnels

The six connecting west central Wisconsin trails, going from southeast to northwest are:

- 400 State Trail (22 mi or 35 km)
- Hillsboro State Trail
- Omaha Trail (13 mi or 21 km), a Juneau County, Wisconsin trail, which also has a tunnel.
- Elroy-Sparta State Trail (32.5 mi or 52.3 km)
- La Crosse River Trail (22 mi or 35 km)
- Great River Trail (24 mi or 39 km)

The Elroy-Sparta State trail connects to the 400 Trail in Elroy. It connects to the La Crosse River Trail in Sparta. There also is a connection in Elroy to the 13-mile Omaha County Trail. The Omaha trail travels between Elroy and Camp Douglas, near Mill Bluff State Park. The Omaha trail features a shorter rock tunnel that is about two blocks long. The Hillsboro State trail is further south from Elroy along the 400 trail at Union Center, Wisconsin.

== Gallery ==
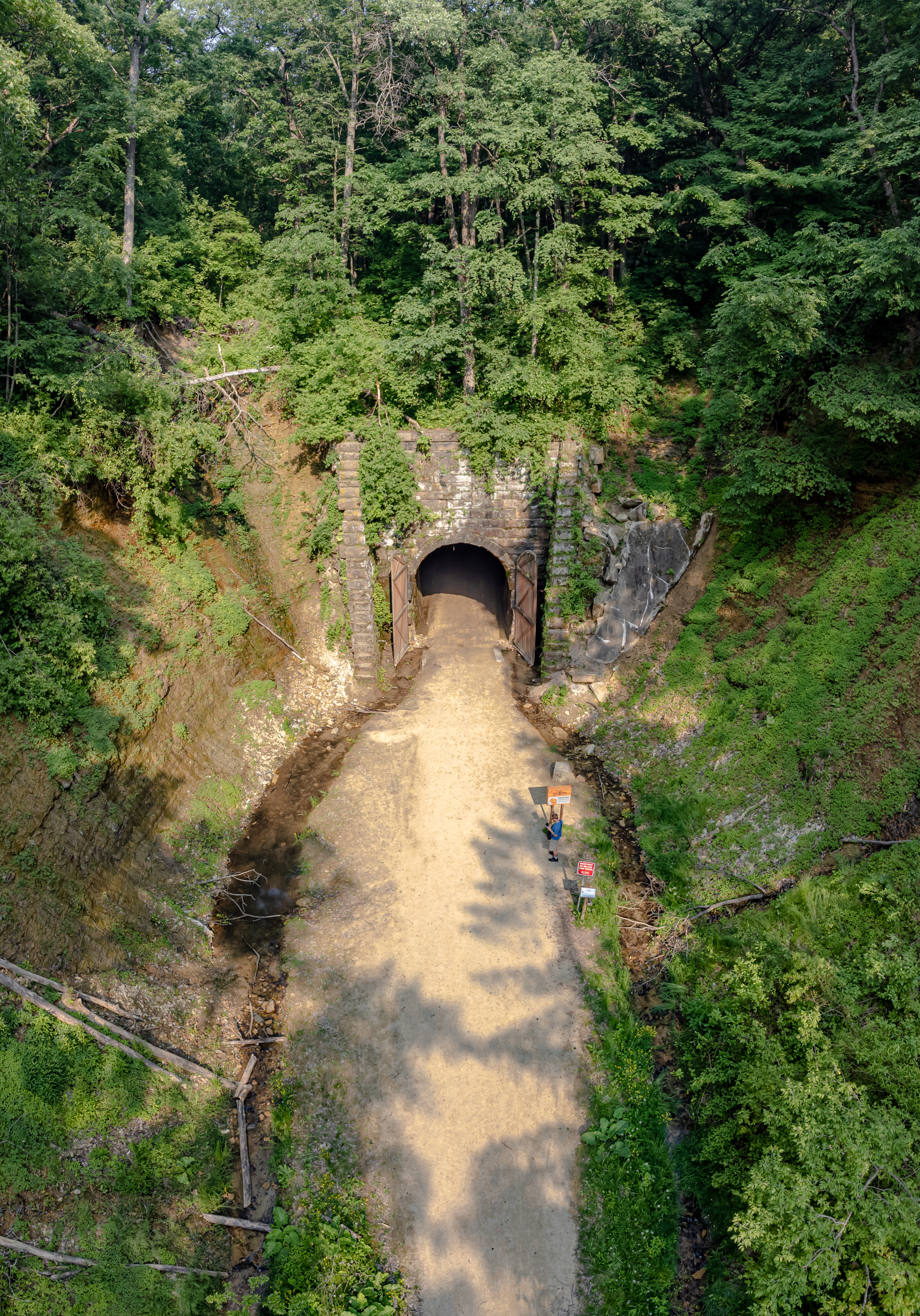
Sparta trails tunnel 3

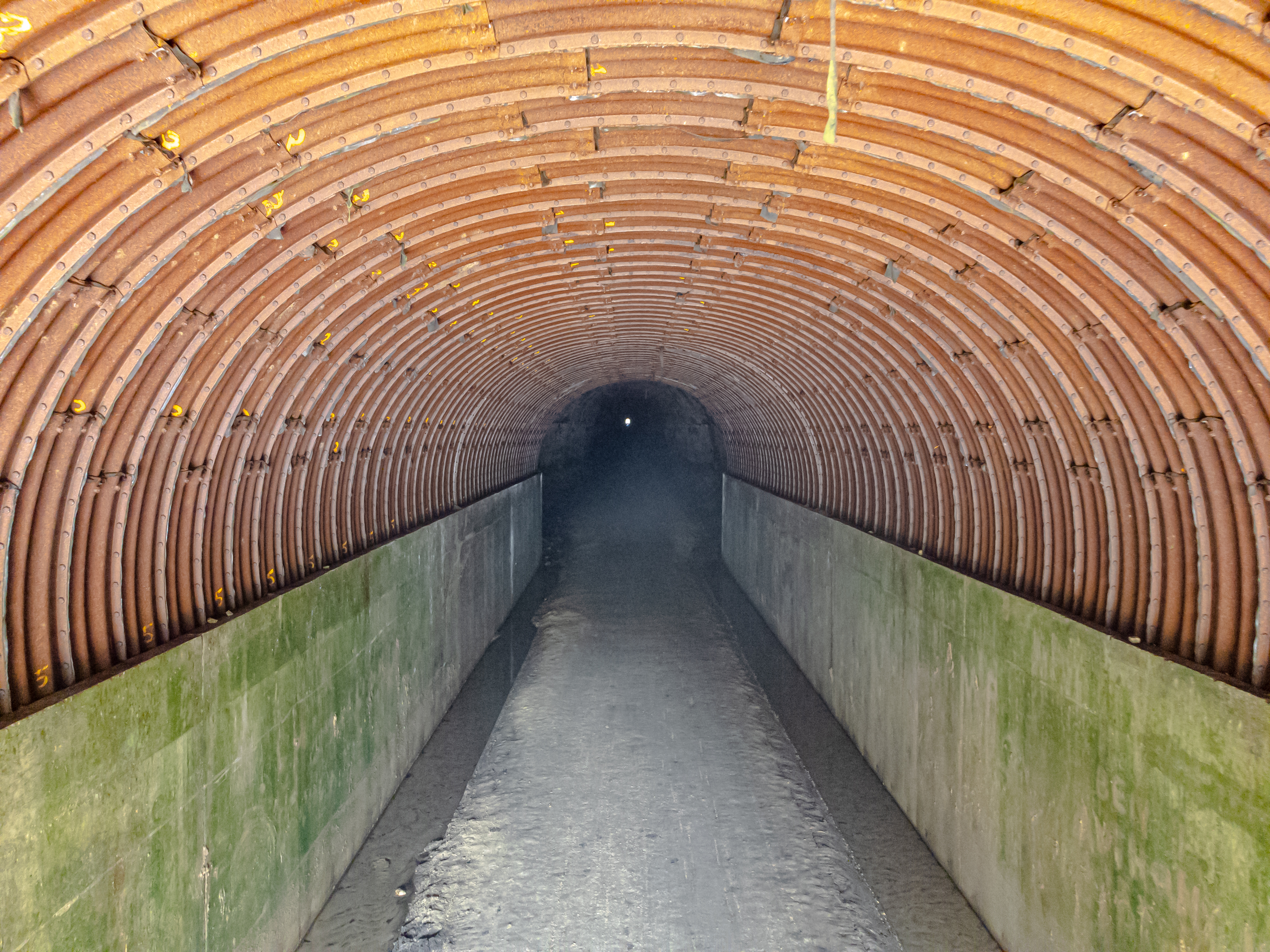
Tunnel 3

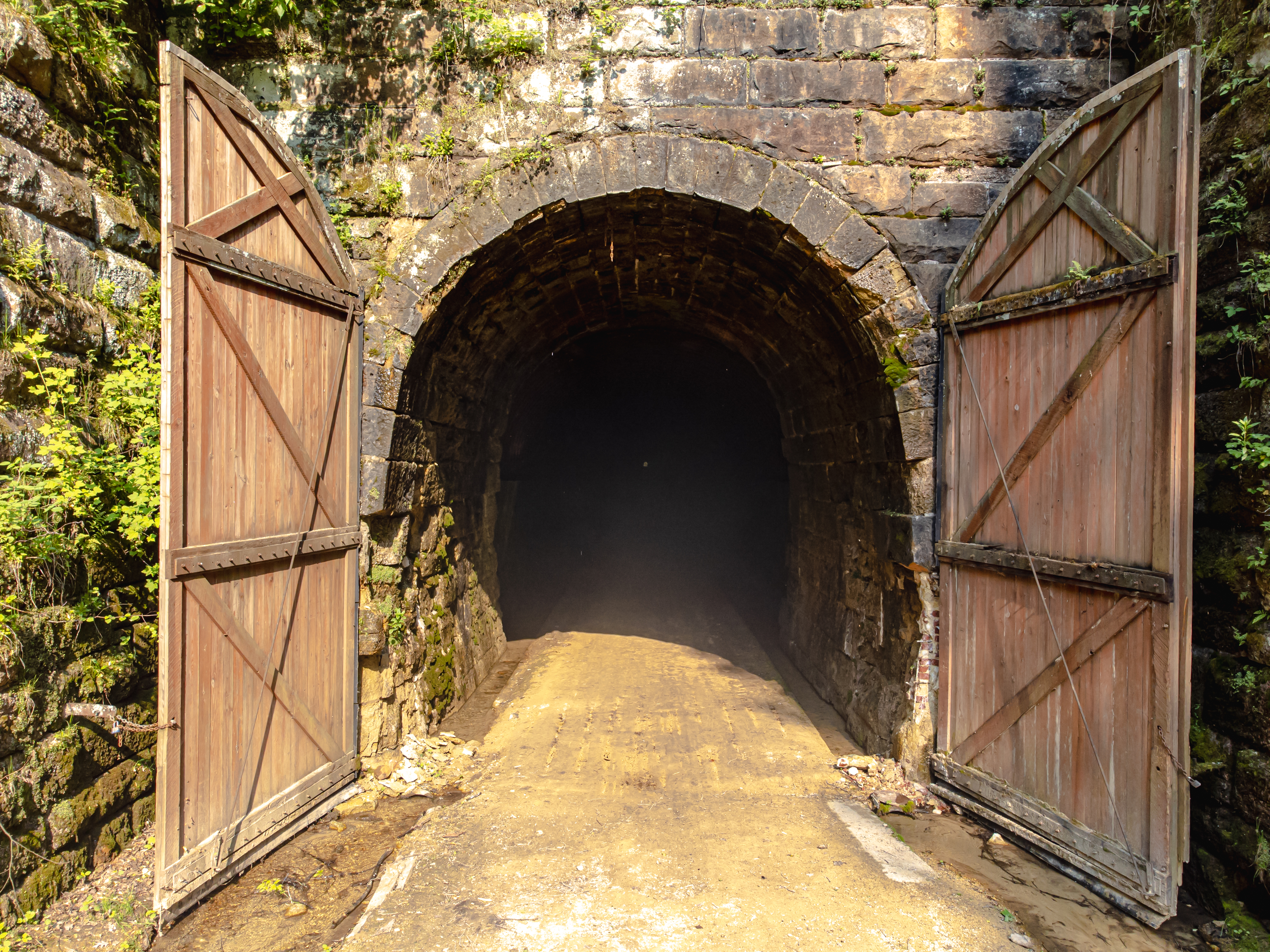
Tunnel 3

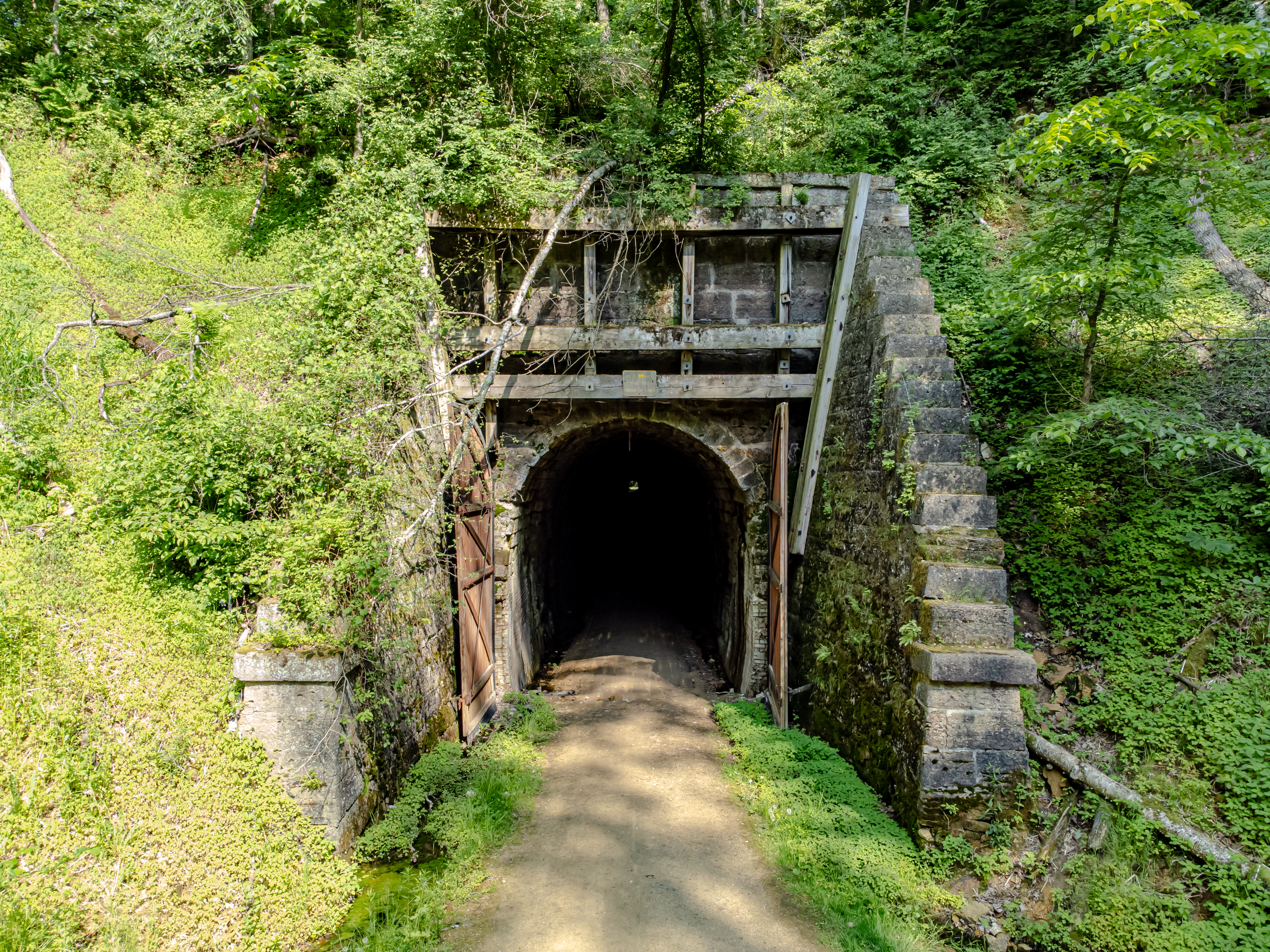
Sparta trail tunnel 2

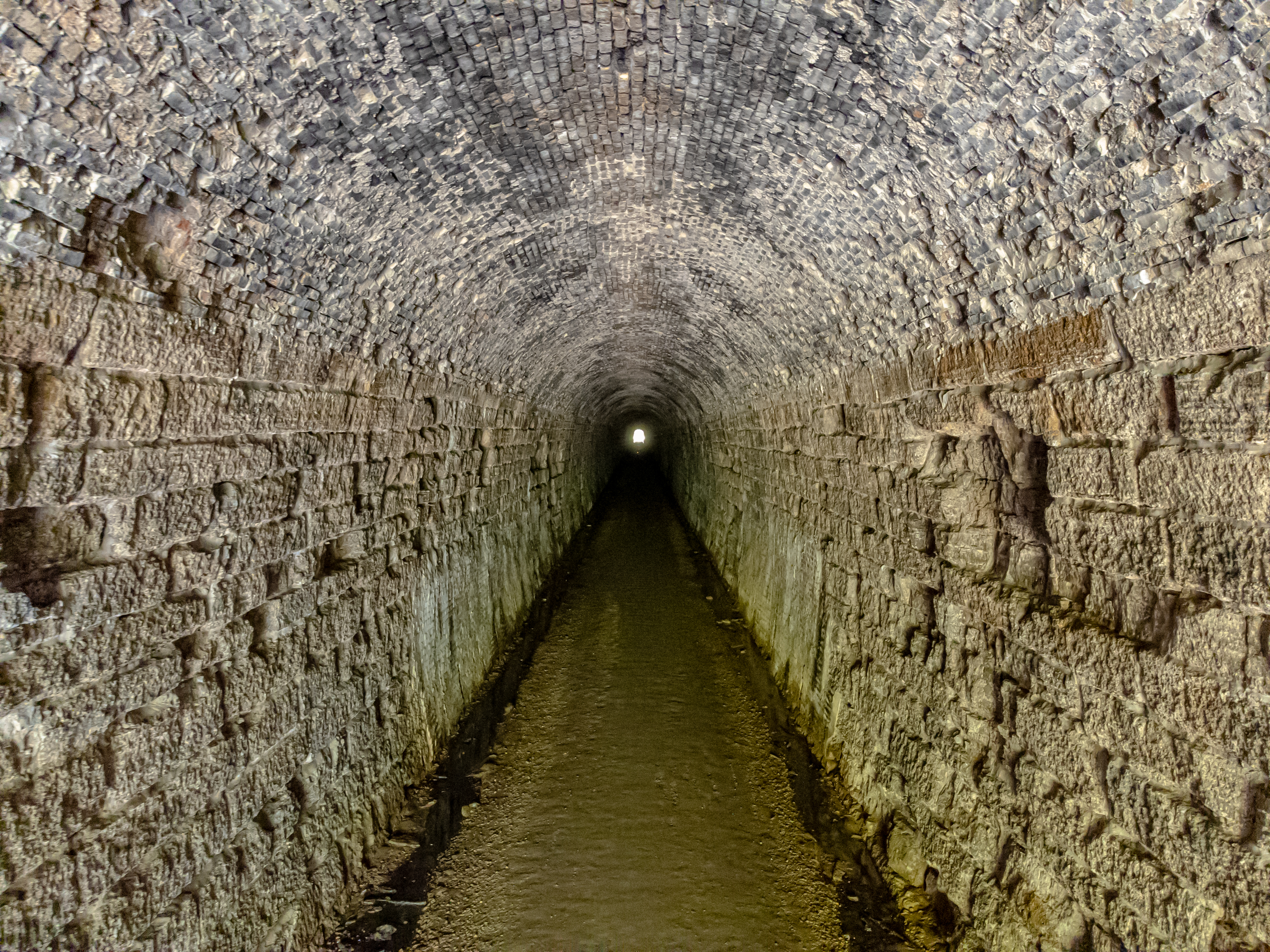
Sparta trail tunnel 2

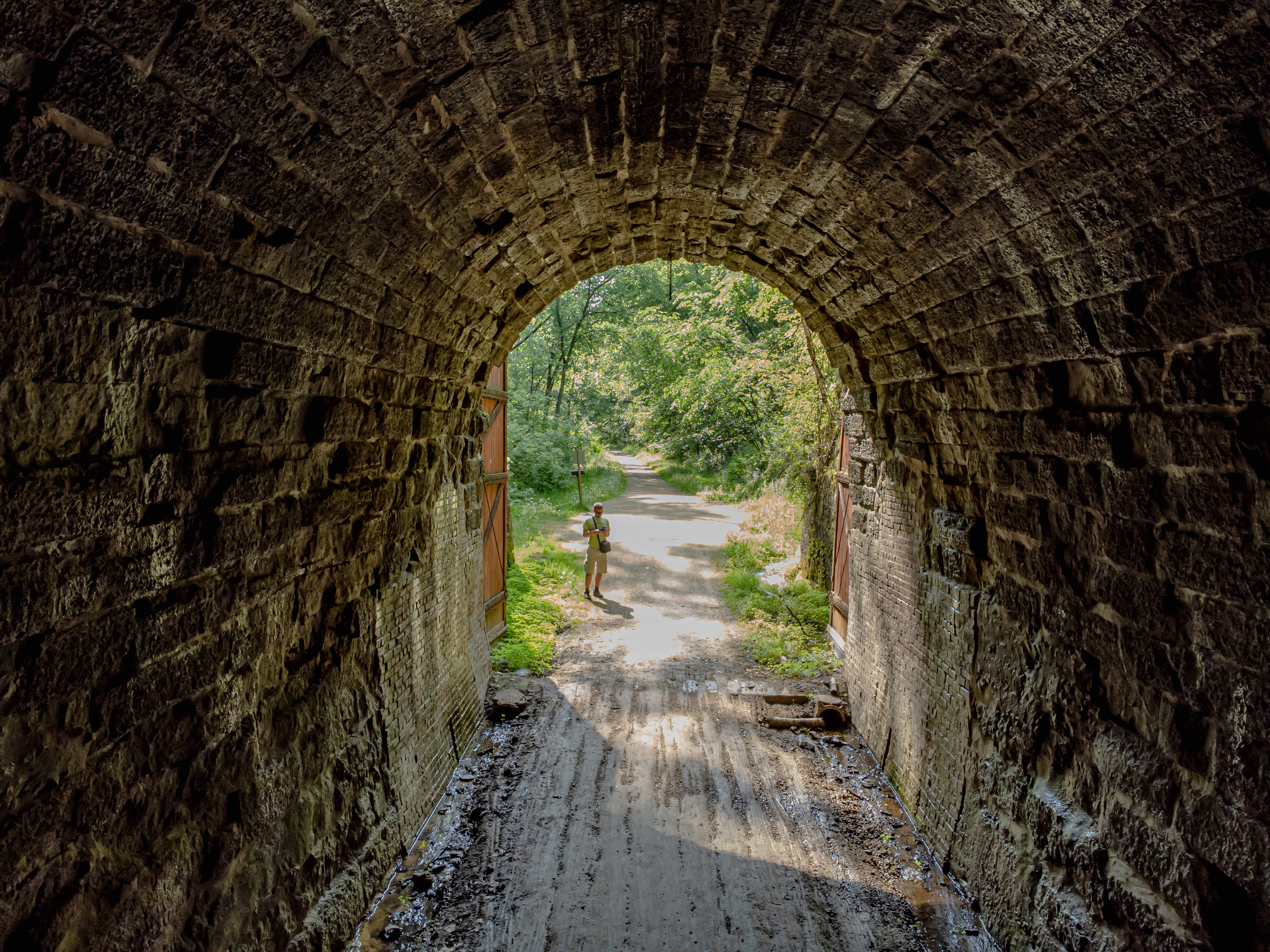
Sparta trail tunnel 2

Sparta trail tunnel 1

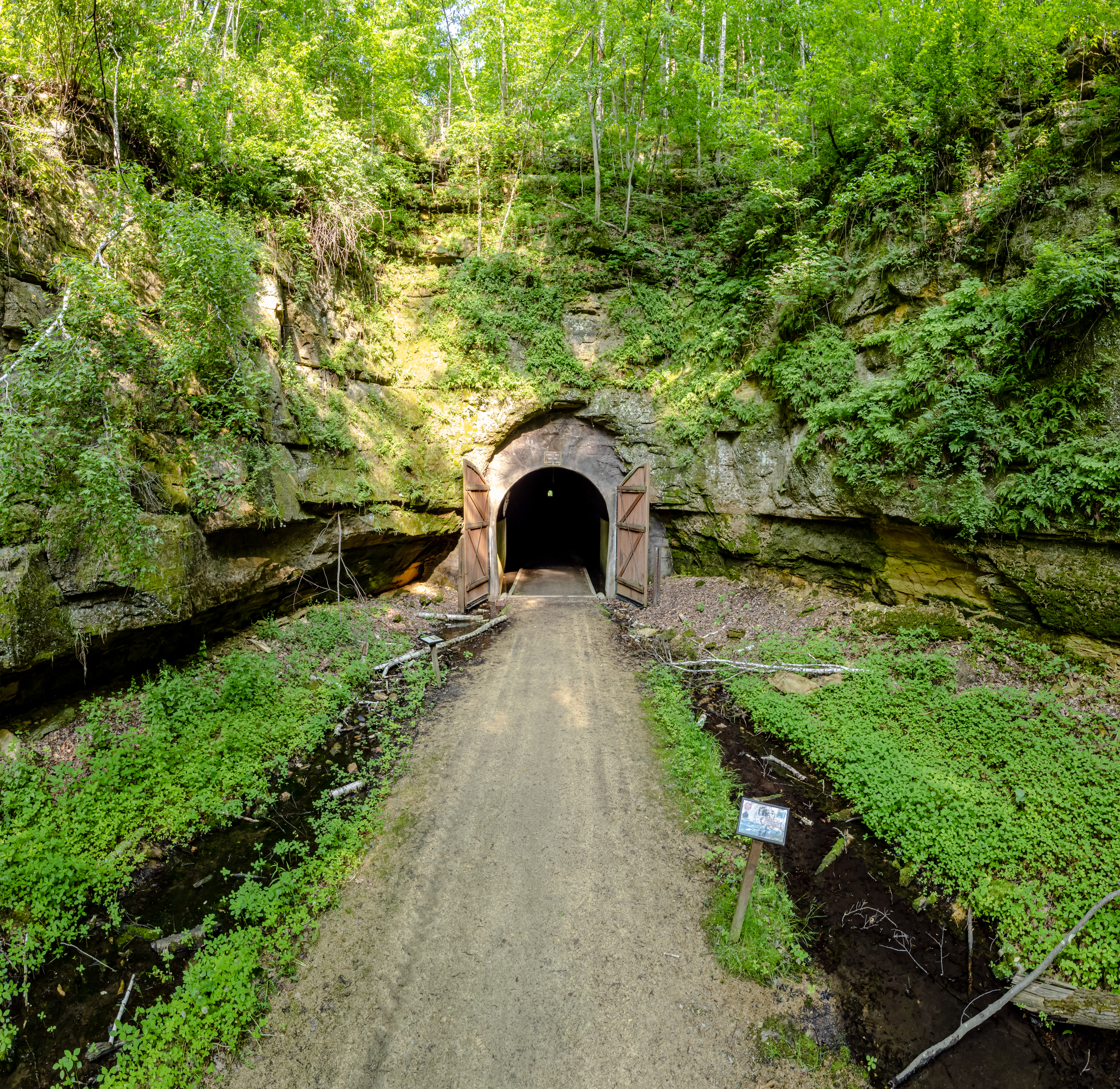
Sparta trail tunnel 1

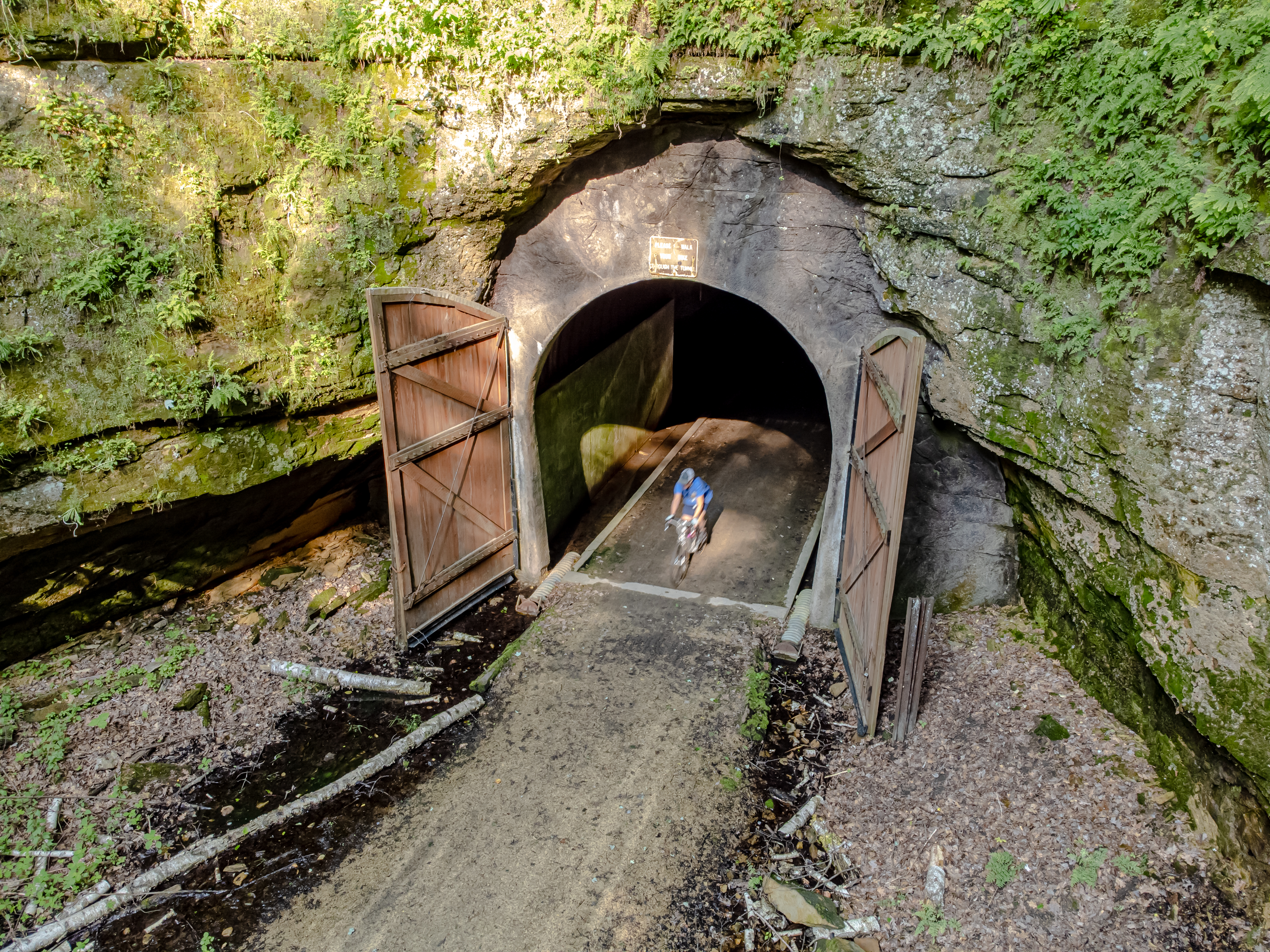
Sparta trail tunnel 1

== See also ==
- List of rail trails
- List of hiking trails in Wisconsin
- Kendalls Depot - National Register of Historic Places in Kendall, Wisconsin
