= List of bike trails in Wisconsin =

The following is a partial list of biking trails in Wisconsin:

== Northeastern Wisconsin ==
- Calumet County Park (Stockbridge)
- Fox River State Recreational Trail — 26.3 miles (42.3 km)
- Friendship State Trail — 18.4 miles (29.6 km)
- Devil's River State Trail — Denmark to Rockwood 14.24 miles (22.92 km)
- Duck Creek Trail — Seymour to Village of Oneida 7 miles (11 km)
- Hartman Creek State Park — 4.3 miles (6.9 km) of trails
- High Cliff State Park — 8.5 miles (13.7 km)
- Mascoutin Valley State Trail — 7.3 miles (11.7 km)
- Mountain Bay State Trail — Green Bay to Wausau 83 miles (134 km)
- Newport State Park — 16.8 miles (27.0 km)
- Newton Blackmour State Trail — Seymour to New London 24 miles (39 km)
- Peninsula State Park — 11.9 miles (19.2 km)
- Point Beach State Forest — 5.0 miles (8.0 km)
- Potawatomi State Park — 4.6 miles (7.4 km)
- Tomorrow River State Trail — 15.0 miles (24.1 km)
- Wiouwash State Trail — 6.1 miles (9.8 km)

== Northern and Northwestern Wisconsin ==
- Bearskin State Trail — 24.6 miles (39.6 km) between Minocqua and Tomahawk (website)
- Black River State Forest — 32.7 miles (52.6 km) of trails near Black River Falls, Wisconsin
- Brule River State Forest — 26.0 miles (41.8 km) near Brule, Wisconsin
- Buffalo River State Trail — 36.4 miles (58.6 km)
- Copper Falls State Park — 7.5 miles (12.1 km) near Morse, Wisconsin
- Eau Claire River Trail — 1.25 miles (2.01 km)
- Flambeau River State Forest — 22 miles (35 km) near Winter, Wisconsin
- Gandy Dancer State Trail — 17.6 miles (28.3 km)
- Kinnikinnick State Park — 10.2 miles (16.4 km)
- Lake Wissota State Park — 11.2 miles (18.0 km) near Chippewa Falls, Wisconsin
- Nine Mile County Forest — 30 miles (48 km)
- Northern Highland-American Legion State Forest — 471.4 miles (758.6 km)
- Old Abe State Trail — 19.5 miles (31.4 km) near Chippewa Falls, Wisconsin
- Pine Line Trail — 26.2 miles (42.2 km) between Medford and Prentice
- Saunders State Trail — 8.4 miles (13.5 km)
- Three Eagle Trail — 12.7 miles (20.4 km) linking Three Lakes, Wisconsin and Eagle River, Wisconsin (website)
- Tuscobia State Trail — 74.0 miles (119.1 km)
- Wild Rivers State Trail — 67.5 miles (108.6 km)
- Willow River State Park — 20 miles (32.2 km)
- WinMan Trails — 11 miles (18 km) four miles north of Manitowish Waters, WI

== South central Wisconsin ==
- Badger State Trail — 40 miles (64 km)
- Blue Mound State Park — 9 miles (14 km) of single-track trails and expanding
- Cannonball Path — 4 mile (6.3 km) of shared-use trails connecting Fitchburg and south Madison
- Capital City State Trail — 17 miles (27 km) of asphalt trails in and around Madison, with connections to the Military Ridge State Trail and the Badger State Trail.
- Devil's Lake State Park — 8 miles (13 km)
- Mirror Lake State Park — 9.2 miles (14.8 km)
- Sugar River State Trail — 23 miles (37 km) between New Glarus and Brodhead
- Wild Goose Trail — 32 miles (51 km) from Fond du Lac to Clyman Junction

== Southeastern Wisconsin ==
- Alpha Mountain Bike Trail — Milwaukee County Parks' first official mountain bike trail. Located near the old Crystal Ridge Ski Hill, now called The Rock Sports Complex in Franklin, Wisconsin, it is a 3-mile (4.8 km) trail operated in cooperation with the Metro Mountain Bikers.
- Bugline Trail
- Burlington-Kansasville State Trail — Proposed trail currently under development between Burlington and Kansasville. 8 miles (13 km)
- Hank Aaron State Trail
- Hoyt Park — 2.5 miles (4.0 km) just east of downtown Wauwatosa on 92nd street.
- Glacial Drumlin State Trail — 52 miles (84 km) from Cottage Grove to Waukesha
- Kettle Moraine State Forest, Northern Unit — 14.5 miles (23.3 km) of trails
- Kettle Moraine State Forest, Southern Unit — 21.2 miles (34.1 km)
  - Connector Trail: This trail connects both Emma Carlin and John Muir; it is a technical, two-way trail, so caution is advised.
- Kinnickinnic River Trail
- Lapham Peak Unit, Kettle Moraine State Forest — 4.8 miles (7.7 km) of mixed use trail
  - Emma Carlin: short, mild hills; does connect with John Muir
  - John Muir: has good technical areas; very hilly on certain paths; does connect with Emma Carlin
- Kohler-Andrae State Park — 2.5 miles (4.0 km)
- New Berlin Trail
- Oak Leaf Trail — A paved multi-use trail which encircles Milwaukee County. It has a total trail length of 106 miles (171 km).
- Old Plank Road Trail — 37.6 miles (60.5 km) from Sheboygan to Fond du Lac
- Ozaukee Interurban Trail — Mostly railroad bed, running the length of Ozaukee county. 30 miles (48 km)
- Powerline Trail
- Richard Bong State Recreation Area — 10.5 miles (16.9 km)
- White River State Trail — Converted railroad bed between Elkhorn and Burlington. 12 miles (19 km)

== Southwestern Wisconsin ==
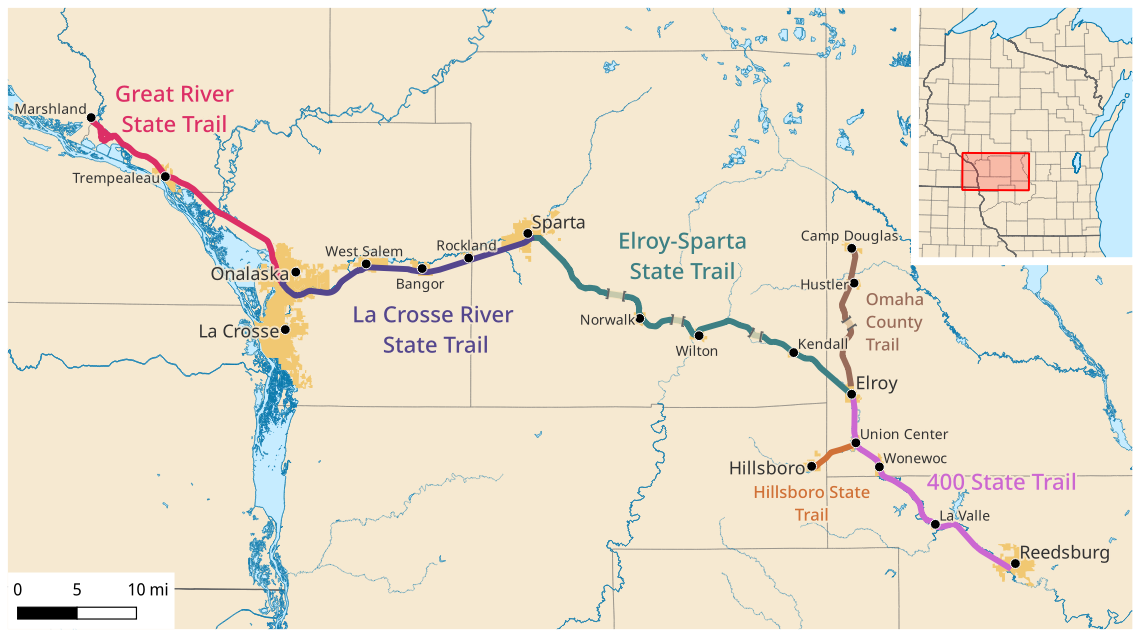
Map of the connected "Bike 4" trails in West Central Wisconsin

- 400 State Trail — Railroad bed between Elroy and Reedsburg. 22-mile (35 km)
- Belmont Mound State Park — 2 miles (3.2 km) of trails
- Browntown-Cadiz Springs State Recreation Area — 1-mile (1.6 km)
- Elroy-Sparta State Trail — Railroad bed with three tunnels 32.5 miles (52.3 km).
- Governor Dodge State Park — 12.6 miles (20.3 km)
- Great River Trail — 24 miles (39 km)
- La Crosse River Trail — 22 miles (35 km)
- Military Ridge State Trail — Near Dodgeville. Two segments totalling 39.5 miles (63.6 km)
- Omaha Trail — Railroad bed with tunnels, runs from Camp Douglas to Elroy. 13 miles (21 km)
- Perrot State Park — 8.5 miles (13.7 km)
- Three Rivers Trail — In La Crosse, and terminating at junction with Great River Trail (just west of Highway 16) 2.3 miles (3.7 km)
- Wyalusing State Park — 7.7 miles (12.4 km)
- Yellowstone Lake State Park — 3.0 miles (4.8 km)

== See also ==
- Wisconsin Off Road Series
