= Baraboo Air Line Railroad =

Overview
- Parent company: Chicago and North Western Railway
- Headquarters: Chicago, Illinois
- Locale: Midwestern United States
- Dates of operation: 1870–1871
- Successor: Chicago and North Western Railway

Technical
- Track gauge: 4 ft 8 1/2 in (1,435 mm)
- Length: 129.10 miles (207.77 km) (incomplete)

The Baraboo Air Line Railroad was a railroad company in the United States. It was incorporated in 1870 to build a line from Madison, Wisconsin, to La Crosse, Wisconsin, as part of a new through route between Madison and Winona, Minnesota. The company was consolidated with the Chicago and North Western Railway (C&NW) in 1871, prior to the completion of the line. After abandonment by the C&NW, part of the Baraboo Air Line route became the first rail trail, the Elroy-Sparta State Trail. Currently, the line from Madison to Reedsburg is operated by the Wisconsin and Southern Railroad. The portion from Reedsburg to Elroy is now the 400 State Trail. The portion from Sparta through Medary is now the La Crosse River Trail.

== History ==
The Madison, Lodi and Baraboo Railroad was incorporated on March 29, 1864. The company graded a line between Columbus and Baraboo via Merrimac but did not lay any track.

The Baraboo Air Line Railroad was incorporated on March 8, 1870, to build north from the Beloit and Madison Railroad in Madison, Wisconsin, to the La Cross, Trempealeau and Prescott Railroad at Winona Junction, near La Crosse, Wisconsin. This would connect a though line of the Chicago and North Western Railway with its subsidiary, the Winona and St. Peter Railroad. On March 10, 1871, it was consolidated with the North Western.

Under the North Western construction continued. By 1872, twenty miles were finished to Lodi, Wisconsin. The ridges between Elroy and Sparta were tunneled at great expense and with much difficulty. The Baraboo Air-Line Rail Road connected to the LaCrosse, Trempealeau & Prescott Railroad at Winona Junction and opened for traffic in September 1873, through to Winona, Minnesota. In 1874, the C&NW reported an expenditure for its three tunnels of $476,743.32 and for the construction of 129 miles of railroad between Madison and Winona Junction of $5,342,169.96.

== Line ==
As completed by the Chicago and North Western Railway, the line ran 129.10 miles (207.77 km) from Madison to Winona Junction. Most of it has since been abandoned and converted to rail trails. The North Western abandoned the line between Sparta and Elroy in 1964; it is now the Elroy-Sparta State Trail, the first rail trail in the United States. The line west of Sparta was abandoned in 1977 in favor of trackage rights over the Milwaukee Road's parallel Tomah Subdivision. It is now the La Crosse River Trail. The line between Reedsburg and Elroy was abandoned in 1986 and is now the 400 State Trail. The line between Reedsburg and Madison is now known as the Reedsburg Subdivision and is leased by the Wisconsin and Southern Railroad.

== See also ==
- Air-line railroad
