= La Crosse River Trail =

Rail trail in Wisconsin, United States

The La Crosse River State Trail is a 22-mile (35 km) rail trail between Sparta and Onalaska, Wisconsin. It is designed for foot, bicycle, equestrian or light motorized traffic. It is designated as a multiuse trail, offering recreational access to the routes, and is open to the public. The trail runs parallel to the La Crosse River.

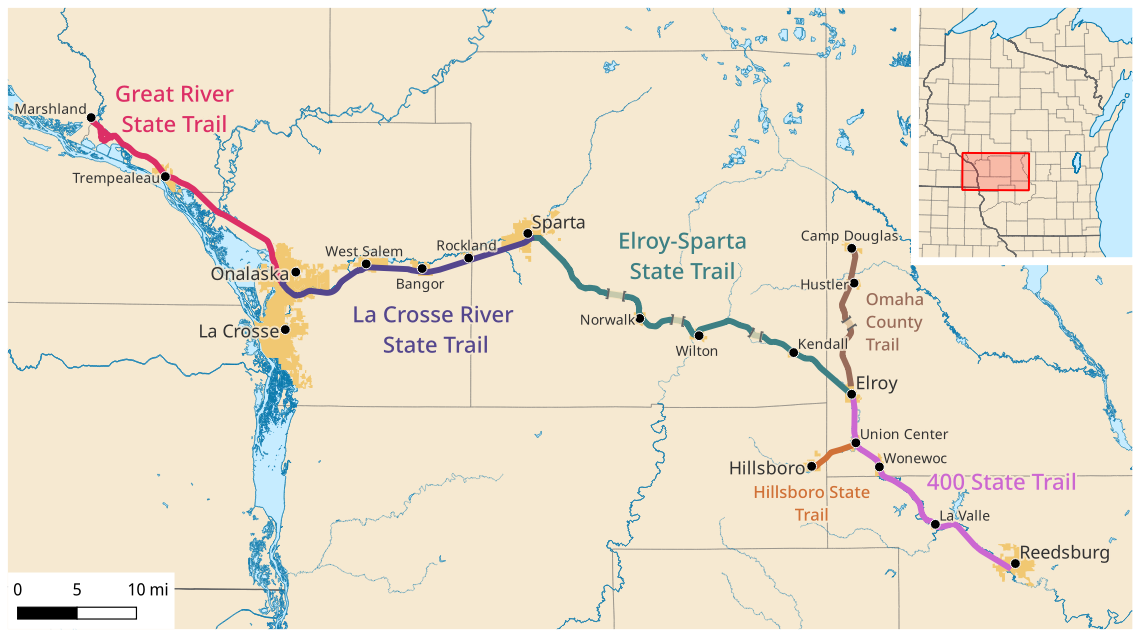
Map of the La Crosse River Trail and connecting trails

It is one of four connecting bike trails in west-central Wisconsin that spans approximately one-third of the state. The trail is known for the rural scenery and terrain of the Coulee Region. It is part of the larger Wisconsin bike trail system, operated by the state of Wisconsin.

The four connecting west central Wisconsin trails, known as the Bike 4 Trails, going from southeast to northwest are:

- the 400 State Trail (22 mi or 35 km)
- the Elroy-Sparta State Trail (32 mi or 51 km)
- the La Crosse River Trail (22 mi or 35 km)
- the Great River Trail (24 mi or 39 km)

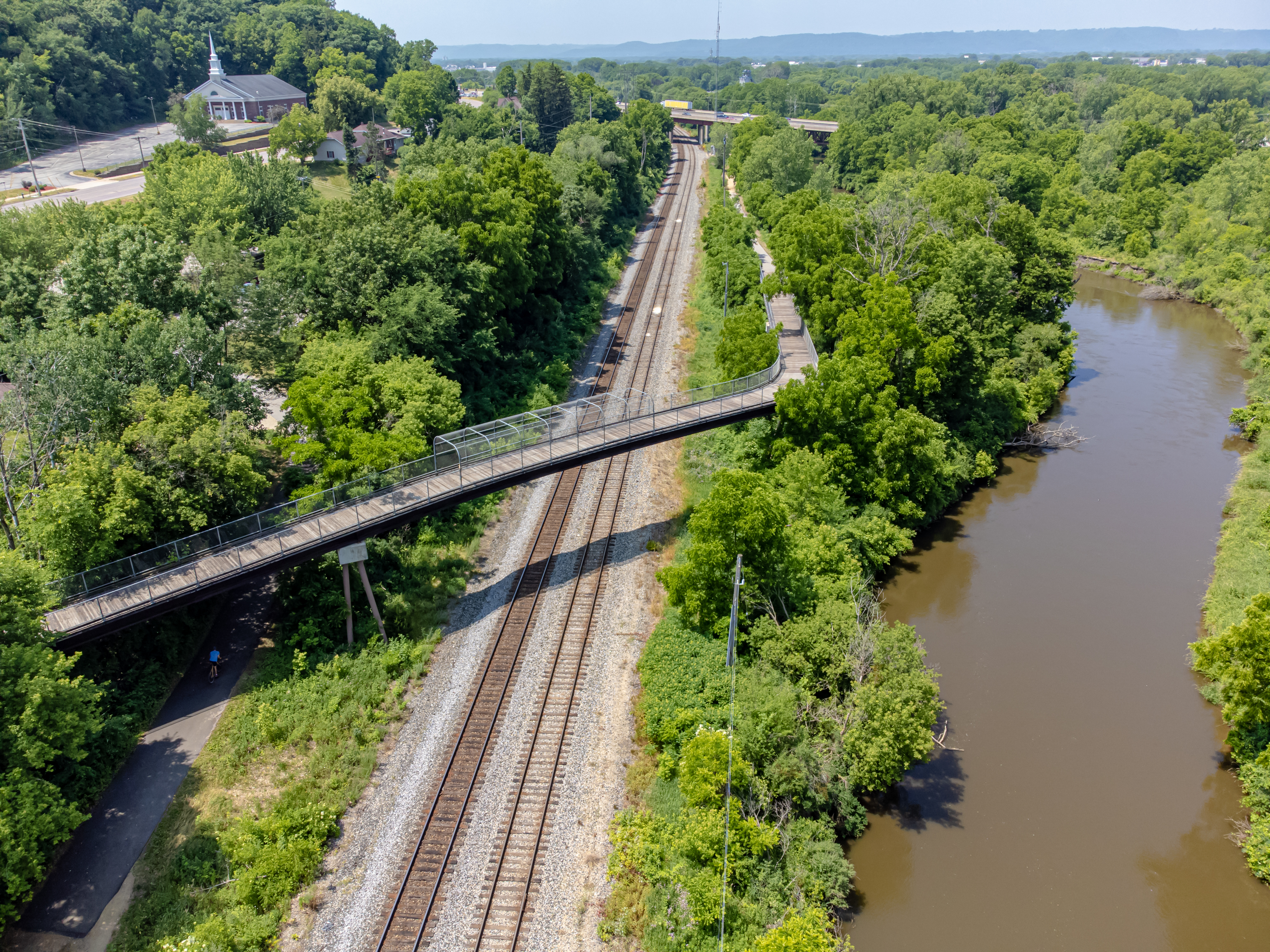
La Crosse River trail bridge over the CP Railway

The western end of the trail is at the intersection with the Great River Trail at a parking lot off of County Highway B east of WIS 16 in Onalaska (43°51′35″N 91°12′06″W), while the eastern end is at the intersection with the Elroy-Sparta State Trail on John St. in Sparta (43°55′55″N 90°47′50″W).

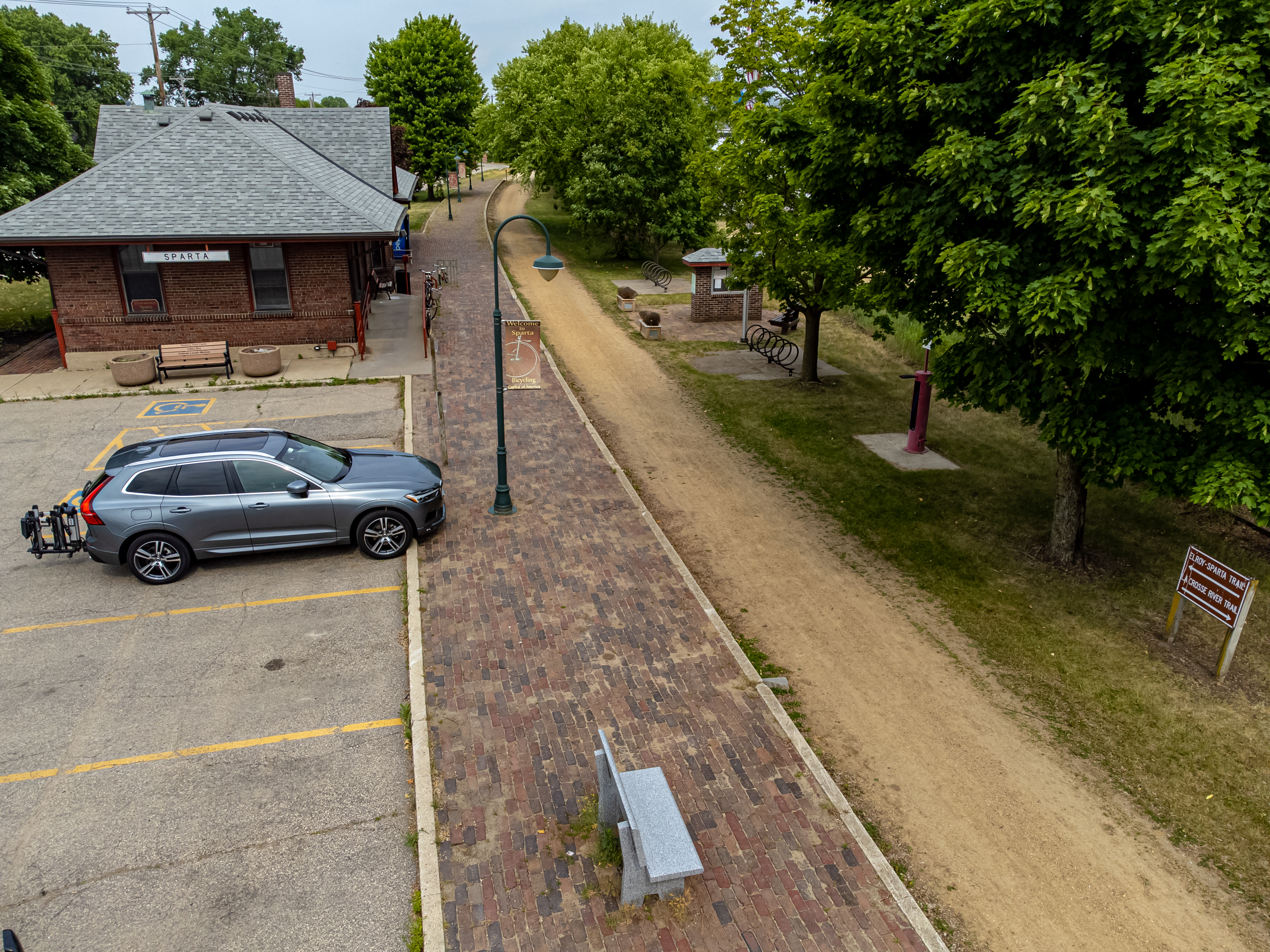
Sparta/La Crosse trails start/end in Sparta

The trail headquarters is located in a historic depot in Sparta and is open from May 1 through October 31. There is a $5.00 per day fee for use of the trail if one does not have the $25.00 yearly Wisconsin bike trail pass. Camping, lodging, food, parking, bike rentals and information are available at many points along the trail.

The trail is constructed upon the abandoned Chicago and North Western Railway railroad bed. It originally was built for the Baraboo Air Line Railroad and the La Crosse, Trempealeau & Presscott Railroad routes from Sparta to Winona, Minnesota. The trail is not paved, but is smooth, and covered with packed crushed limestone.

== See also ==
- List of rail trails
- What is a rail trail
- List of hiking trails in Wisconsin
- List of bike trails in Wisconsin
