= Peter A. Cleary =

American politician

Peter A. Cleary (December 31, 1873 – December 20, 1940) was an American politician and businessman.

Born in Andover, Allegany County, New York, Cleary moved with his parents to Wisconsin in 1881 and eventually settled in Elroy, Wisconsin. He graduated from Elroy High School in 1891 and was a cashier and bookkeeper. He was in the real estate and insurance business. In 1900, Cleary was the Elroy city assessor. In 1902 and 1904, Cleary served as mayor of Elroy, Wisconsin. In 1905, Cleary served in the Wisconsin State Assembly and was a Democrat. From 1932 to 1938, Cleary served as the Wisconsin State Banking Commissioner. He then lived in Milwaukee, Wisconsin and was involved with the Milwaukee Building and Loan League and the Hopkins Street Building and Loan Association. Cleary died in Milwaukee, Wisconsin.
