= Beloit and Madison Railroad =

Former railroad in Illinois and Wisconsin

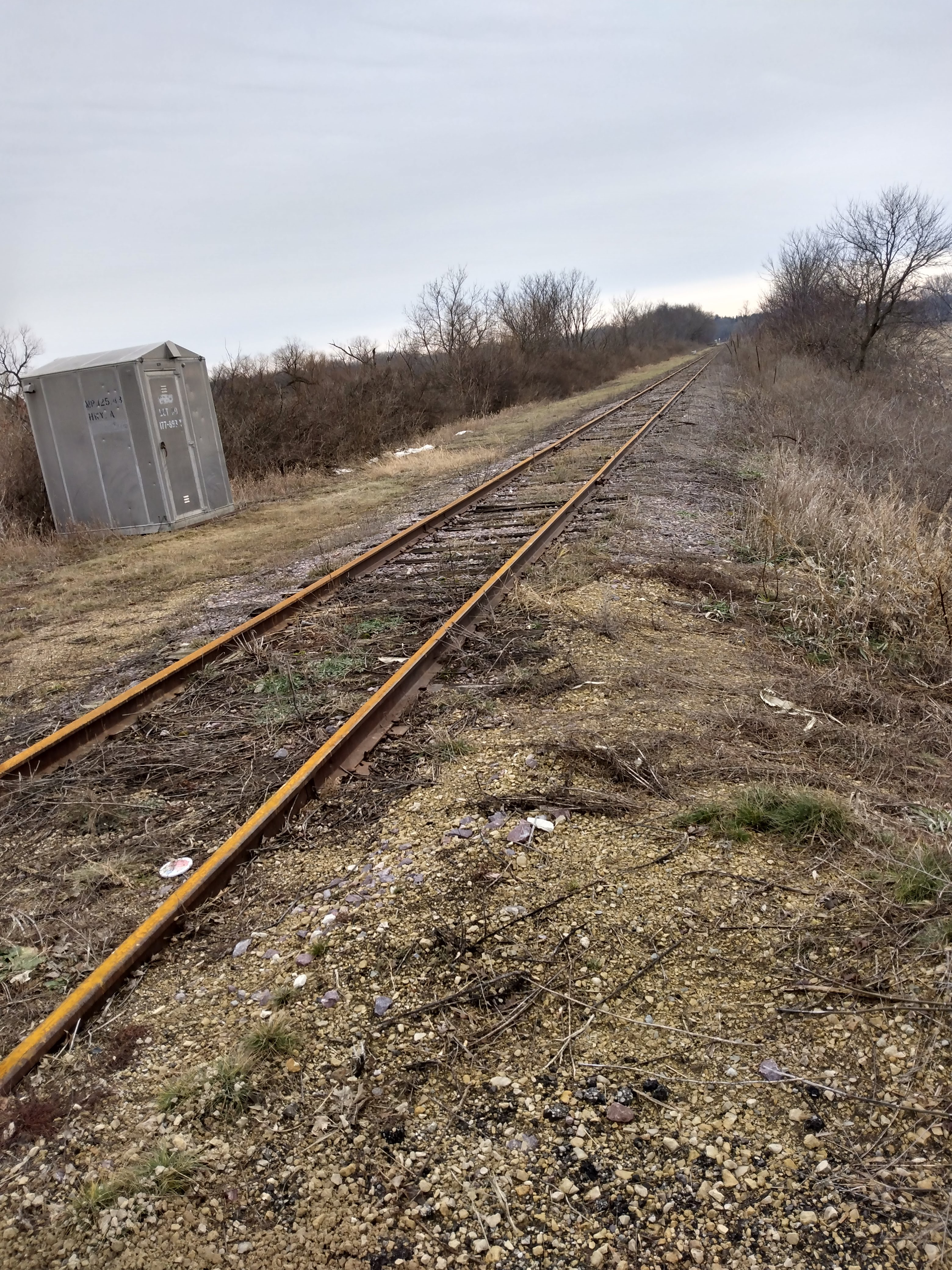
- A view of the railroad corridor south of Oregon, now operated by Wisconsin and Southern Railroad

Overview
- Dates of operation: 1852–1871
- Successor: Chicago and North Western Railway

Technical
- Track gauge: 1,435 mm (4 ft 8 1/2 in)
- Length: 48.8 miles (78.5 km)

The Beloit and Madison Railroad was a railroad company in the states of Illinois of Wisconsin. It was incorporated in 1852 and opened its first line in 1854. Upon completion, the railroad was leased by the Galena and Chicago Union Railroad, and the company merged into the Chicago and North Western Railway in 1871.

== History ==
The Beloit and Madison Railroad was incorporated on February 18, 1852, to construct a railway line from Beloit, Wisconsin to Madison via Janesville. At the southern end the line would connect with the Galena and Chicago Union Railroad, which would build a branch from its main line at Belvidere north to Beloit. The two companies shared several members of the board and the same company president. Service over the Galena and Chicago Union's branch to Beloit began on November 14, 1853. The Beloit and Madison opened its line between Beloit and Afton on August 15, 1854, and then to Footville on December 18, bypassing Janesville. The line was built using strap rail previously used on the Michigan Southern Railroad and Galena and Chicago Union.

The Galena and Chicago Union leased the Beloit and Madison Railroad in 1854, once the line was in operation. The Milwaukee and Mississippi Railroad, a forerunner of the Milwaukee Road, crossed the Beloit and Madison's line at Hanover in 1857. In 1858, amid the Panic of 1857, Galena and Chicago Union trains began using the Milwaukee and Mississippi's line to reach Janesville. In 1860, the company extended its line north from Footville to Magnolia. The company was reorganized on September 18, 1862, but kept the name Beloit and Madison Railroad and remained under lease to the Galena and Chicago Union.

The Galena and Chicago Union consolidated with the Chicago and North Western Railway on June 2, 1864. The Beloit and Madison extended its line to Madison on September 7, 1864. The Beloit and Madison company was merged into the Chicago and North Western on January 10, 1871.

== Route ==
As built, the Beloit and Madison's main line extended 48.8 miles (78.5 km) from Beloit to Madison via Afton. The southern portion of line became less important in 1886 with the opening of the "Evansville Cut-off" between Evansville (on the Beloit–Madison line) and Janesville. This shortened the route between Madison and Chicago. The Chicago and North Western abandoned the section between Evansville and Beloit, known as the Footville Subdivision, in 1979. The line north of Evansville is operated by the Wisconsin and Southern Railroad as part of the Reedsburg Subdivision.
