= Air-line railroad =

Relatively flat and straight railroad

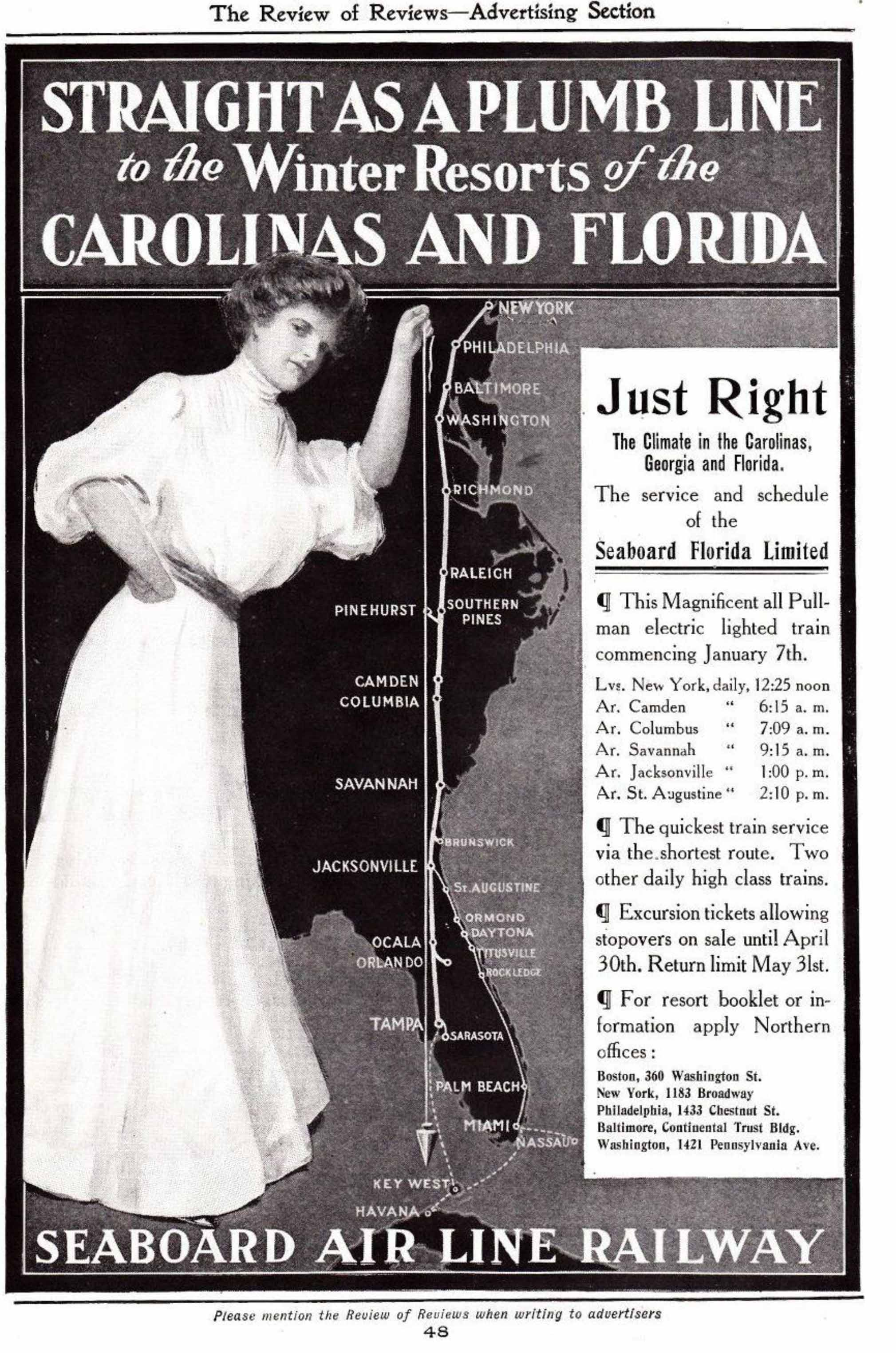
"Straight as a plumb line": Seaboard Air Line Railway advertisement illustrating the "quickest train service via the shortest route" to Florida, 1902.

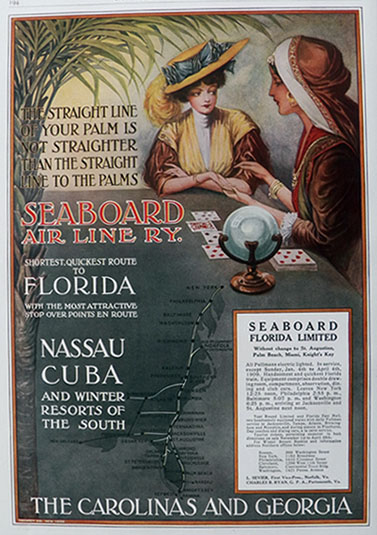
"The straight line of your palm is not straighter than the straight line to the palms": another advertisement for the Seaboard Air Line's "shortest, quickest route to Florida", 1908.

An air-line railroad is a railway built or rebuilt to grades and curve radii sufficient to allow high-speed operation, often bypassing older, slower routes. In their heyday, prior to the advent of widespread commercial aviation, they were often referred to simply as "air lines".

== Dictionary definition ==
Webster's 1913 dictionary gives the definition "Air line, a straight line; a bee line. Hence Air-line, adj.; as, air-line road."

== Public reaction ==
Air line railroads began to be built in the mid-nineteenth century. As early as 1853, the New York Daily Times ran a satirical article mocking the trend, suggesting that the fad for an "air line" name was being used to float dubious investments:

The "air-line" is three miles and nine-thirteenths shorter from Quattlebum to Squashtown than the present traveled route by the Conger Creek railroad.... Though we know there is already a railroad in operation between Quattlebum and Squash Town, parallel with and not far from our air-line... we feel satisfied that the immense current of travel, now passing by Conger Creek, must be changed, in the twinkling of an eye, to the air-line road. What sane individual, starting at Quattlebum and bound for Squash, will take the Conger Creek road when he can go by way of Shootsburg in two minutes less time, and at very little more cost?

When actual air travel began in the United States, the older usage of the phrase "air line" led to confusion. During a spate of interest in aviation shares on Wall Street following Charles A. Lindbergh's trans-Atlantic flight in 1927, Seaboard Air Line shares actually attracted some investor curiosity because of the name's aviation-related connotations; only after noticing that Seaboard Air Line was actually a railroad did investors lose interest.

== List of air line railroads ==
- Seaboard Air Line Railroad (before 1946 called the Seaboard Air Line Railway, 'SAL'), a major system in the U.S. South, now part of CSX
- Air-Line Railroad (North Carolina), part of the Southern Railway
- Air-Line Railroad (South Carolina), part of the Southern Railway
- Air Line Railroad (Texas), incorporated 1850, predecessor of the Southern Pacific Company
- Arkansas Midland Railroad, a planned air-line railroad between Helena and Little Rock in Arkansas
- Atlanta and Birmingham Air Line Railway, part of the Seaboard Air Line Railroad
- Atlanta and Charlotte Air-Line Railway, part of the Southern Railway
- Atlanta and Richmond Air-Line Railway, part of the Southern Railway
- Auburn and Deposit Air Line Railroad in New York (never built)
- Baraboo Air Line Railroad, part of the Chicago and North Western Railway
- Birmingham and Atlanta Air-Line Railroad, part of the Seaboard Air Line Railroad
- Boston and New York Air-Line Railroad, part of the New York, New Haven and Hartford Railroad
- Canada Air-Line Railway, part of the Grand Trunk Railway
- Chicago, Santa Fe and California Railway, part of the Atchison, Topeka and Santa Fe Railway
- Chicago and Indiana Air Line Railway, part of the South Shore Line
- Chicago and Indianapolis Air-Line Railroad, part of the Chicago, Indianapolis and Louisville Railroad
- Chicago-New York Electric Air Line Railroad. Less than 50 km (30 miles) was built and used until the 1940s as an interurban eastwards from Chicago, Illinois
- Chicago and Northern Pacific Air-Line Railroad and Chicago and Northern Pacific Air-Line Railway, part of the Chicago and North Western Railway
- Cincinnati and Chicago Air-Line Railroad, part of the Pennsylvania Railroad
- Clinton Air Line Railroad, 1850s proposed railroad, graded but never laid with tracks, would have run from Hudson, OH to Tiffin, OH
- Dixon Air Line Railroad, part of the Chicago and North Western Railway
- Eastern and Western Air Line Railway, defunct narrow gauge road in northwest Ohio
- Elberton Air Line Railroad, part of the Southern Railway
- Eufaula and St. Andrews Bay Air-line Railroad in Florida (never built)
- Fargo and St. Louis Air Line Railway, part of the Chicago, Milwaukee, St. Paul and Pacific Railroad
- Georgia Air Line Railroad, part of the Southern Railway
- Kansas City and Independence Air Line Railroad, part of the Kansas City Southern Railway
- Le Roy and Caney Valley Air Line Railway, part of the Missouri Pacific Railroad
- Long Island Railroad, formerly a subsidiary of the Pennsylvania Railroad; especially the Ronkonkoma and Babylon Branches; track routes established before the suburban development of Long Island
- Louisville, New Albany and St. Louis Air-Line Railway, part of the Southern Railway
- Macon and Florida Air Line Railroad, part of the Southern Railway
- Michigan Air-Line Railroad and Michigan Air-Line Railway, part of the New York Central Railroad and Grand Trunk Railway
- Milltown Air Line Railway, a logging railroad in Georgia
- Montreal and Boston Air Line, a marketing name used by the Boston and Lowell Railroad
- National Air Line Railroad
- New Albany and St. Louis Air Line Railway, part of the Southern Railway
- New York and Boston Rapid Transit Company (never built)
- New York and Connecticut Air Line Railroad (never built)
- New York and Pittsburgh Air Line Railroad
- New York and Washington Air Line Railway (never built)
- Niagara River and New York Air Line Railroad in New York (never built)
- Northern Air-Line Railroad in New York (never built)
- Northern Nebraska Air Line Railroad, part of the Chicago and North Western Railway
- Pennsylvania Railroad along New Jersey section of the Northeast Corridor
- Piedmont Air-Line Railway, part of the Southern Railway
- Quebec and Boston Air Line Railway (never built)
- Raleigh and Augusta Air-Line Railroad, part of the Seaboard Air Line Railroad
- Richmond and Washington Air Line Railroad (never built)
- Salamanca Air Line Railroad in New York
- Santa Monica Air Line in Los Angeles County
- Seaboard Air Line Belt Railroad (Atlanta, Georgia), part of the Seaboard Air Line Railroad
- Seaboard Inland Air Line Railroad, a predecessor of the SAL
- Southern New England Railway, Never completed.
- St. Charles Air Line Railroad in Chicago, Illinois
- St. Clair and Chicago Air Line Railroad, part of the Grand Trunk Railway
- St. Louis, Oklahoma and Texas Air-Line Railroad, part of the Chicago, Rock Island and Pacific Railroad
- Stillmore Air Line Railway, part of the Central of Georgia Railway
- Utica and Syracuse Air Line Railway in New York (never built)
- Virginia Air Line Railway, part of the Chesapeake and Ohio Railway (defunct)
- Waycross Air Line Railroad, part of the Atlantic Coast Line Railroad
