= Elroy, Wisconsin =

- City
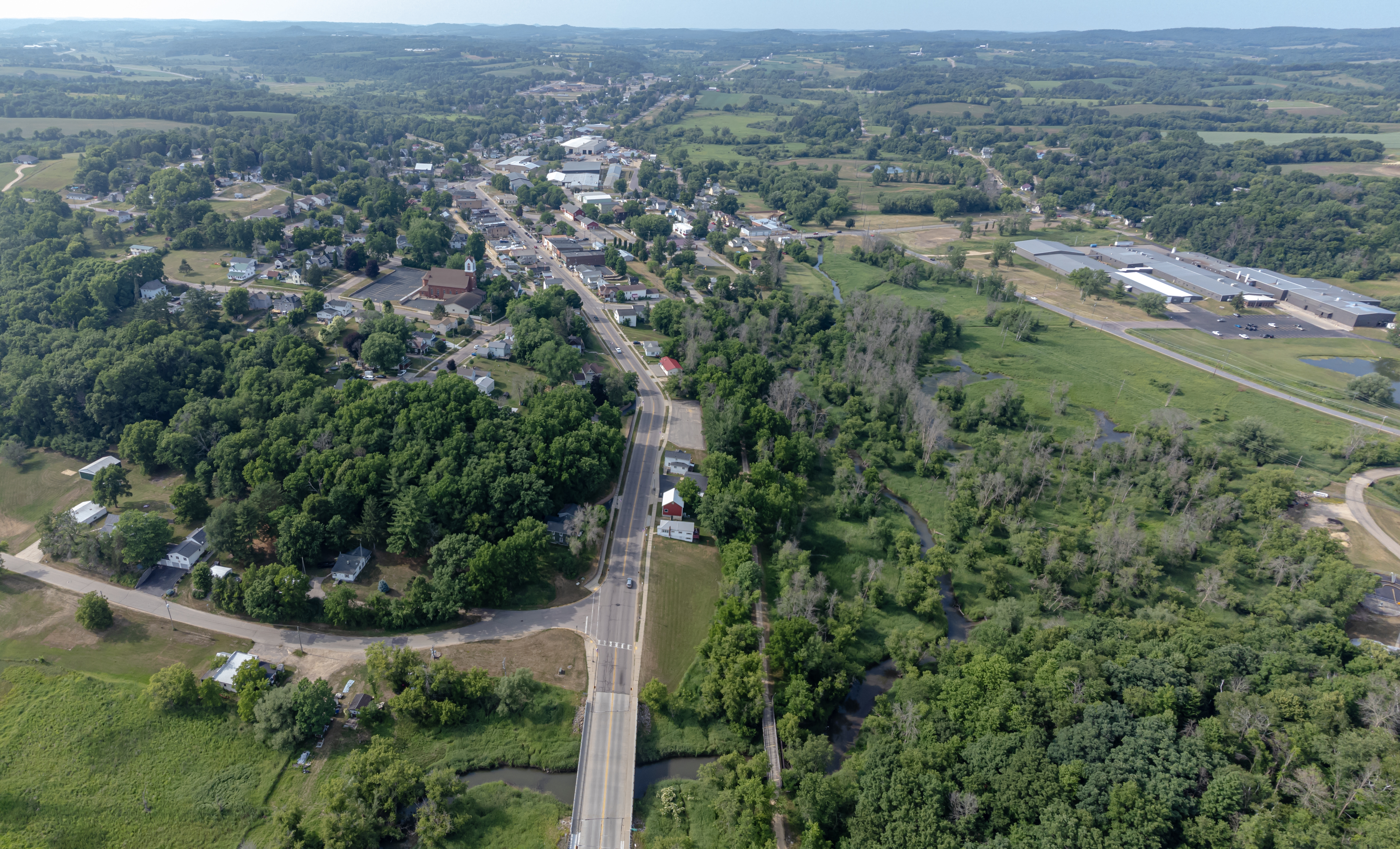

- Location of Elroy in Juneau County, Wisconsin.

- Location within Wisconsin Location within the United States
- Coordinates: 43°44′31″N 90°16′11″W
- Country: United States
- State: Wisconsin
- County: Juneau

Area
  - Total: 1.97 sq mi (5.09 km^{2})
  - Land: 1.97 sq mi (5.09 km^{2})
  - Water: 0 sq mi (0.00 km^{2})
- Elevation: 978 ft (298 m)

Population (2020)
  - Total: 1,356
  - Density: 690/sq mi (266.3/km^{2})
- Time zone: UTC-6 (Central (CST))
  - Summer (DST): UTC-5 (CDT)
- Zip Code: 53929
- Area code: 608
- FIPS code: 55-23800
- GNIS feature ID: 1564593
- Website: elroywi.com

Elroy is a city in Juneau County, Wisconsin, United States, along the Baraboo River and at the east end of the Elroy-Sparta State Trail. The population was 1,356 at the 2020 census.

== History ==
Elroy was named in 1858, supposedly after a place in Scotland.

By another account, the original residents chose "LeRoy" as the name for the community and its post office, but were informed that another community in the state had that name already. Switching the first two letters was suggested and adopted.

A post office called Elroy has been in operation since 1862.

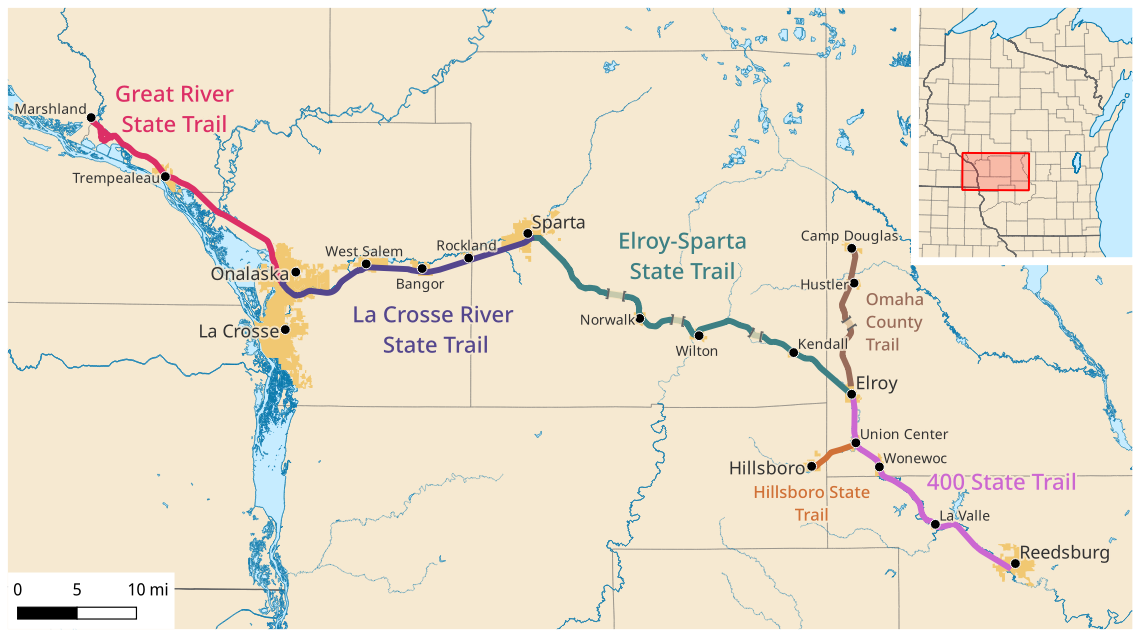
Map of the Elroy-Sparta State Trail and connecting trails

Elroy was for many years an important railroad hub in the area. The Baraboo Air Line Railroad reached Elroy in the 1870s. The Air Line was later acquired by the Chicago and North Western Railway and the line was pushed on to Sparta, Wisconsin. It eventually became the main line of the CNW between Chicago, Illinois and Winona, Minnesota. The Chicago, St. Paul, Minneapolis and Omaha Railway also became a presence in Elroy when its line was built from St. Paul, Minnesota, south through Camp Douglas, Wisconsin. Both railroad companies kept roundhouses and other operations in Elroy. Rail traffic on the Elroy portion of the CNW eventually declined, due to the construction of better mainline trackage further to the north (via Adams, Necedah, and Wyeville). The rails on this portion were taken up in the mid-1960s and the right-of-way was converted into the Elroy-Sparta Bike Trail, as it remains today. The CNW tracks from Elroy southeast to Reedsburg, Wisconsin, along with those of the north-south Omaha line, were taken up in the 1990s, and these rights-of-way are now known as the "400" State Trail, and the Omaha Trail, respectively.

== Geography ==
Elroy is located at 43°44′31″N 90°16′11″W (43.742016, -90.269597).

According to the United States Census Bureau, the city has a total area of 1.97 square miles (5.10 km^{2}), all land.

The city is primarily surrounded by the Town of Plymouth and partially touches the Town of Wonewoc on the southern end.

== Demographics ==
Historical population
Census	Pop.	Note	%±
1880	663		—
1890	1,413		113.1%
1900	1,685		19.2%
1910	1,729		2.6%
1920	1,713		−0.9%
1930	1,546		−9.7%
1940	1,850		19.7%
1950	1,654		−10.6%
1960	1,505		−9.0%
1970	1,513		0.5%
1980	1,504		−0.6%
1990	1,533		1.9%
2000	1,578		2.9%
2010	1,442		−8.6%
2020	1,356		−6.0%
U.S. Decennial Census

=== 2010 census ===
As of the census of 2010, there were 1,442 people, 590 households, and 348 families living in the city. The population density was 728.3 inhabitants per square mile (281.2/km^{2}). There were 680 housing units at an average density of 343.4 per square mile (132.6/km^{2}). The racial makeup of the city was 96.8% White, 0.3% African American, 0.8% Native American, 0.2% Asian, 0.3% from other races, and 1.6% from two or more races. Hispanic or Latino of any race were 2.2% of the population.

There were 590 households, of which 28.8% had children under the age of 18 living with them, 42.4% were married couples living together, 11.9% had a female householder with no husband present, 4.7% had a male householder with no wife present, and 41.0% were non-families. 33.6% of all households were made up of individuals, and 13.4% had someone living alone who was 65 years of age or older. The average household size was 2.32 and the average family size was 2.92.

The median age in the city was 41.6 years. 22.5% of residents were under the age of 18; 6.7% were between the ages of 18 and 24; 24.3% were from 25 to 44; 27% were from 45 to 64; and 19.4% were 65 years of age or older. The gender makeup of the city was 48.2% male and 51.8% female.

=== 2000 census ===
As of the census of 2000, there were 1,578 people, 632 households, and 396 families living in the city. The population density was 823.0 people per square mile (317.3/km^{2}). There were 692 housing units at an average density of 360.9 per square mile (139.2/km^{2}). The racial makeup of the city was 98.48% White, 0.32% African American, 0.32% Native American, 0.13% Asian, 0.38% from other races, and 0.38% from two or more races. Hispanic or Latino of any race were 1.27% of the population.

There were 632 households, out of which 31.5% had children under the age of 18 living with them, 48.7% were married couples living together, 9.5% had a female householder with no husband present, and 37.3% were non-families. 32.0% of all households were made up of individuals, and 15.0% had someone living alone who was 65 years of age or older. The average household size was 2.36 and the average family size was 2.97.

In the city, the population was spread out, with 26.0% under the age of 18, 7.7% from 18 to 24, 26.7% from 25 to 44, 19.4% from 45 to 64, and 20.2% who were 65 years of age or older. The median age was 39 years. For every 100 females, there were 95.3 males. For every 100 females age 18 and over, there were 88.1 males.

The median income for a household in the city was $31,859, and the median income for a family was $42,452. Males had a median income of $31,699 versus $24,250 for females. The per capita income for the city was $15,529. About 9.9% of families and 14.2% of the population were below the poverty line, including 17.3% of those under age 18 and 11.8% of those age 65 or over.

== Gallery ==
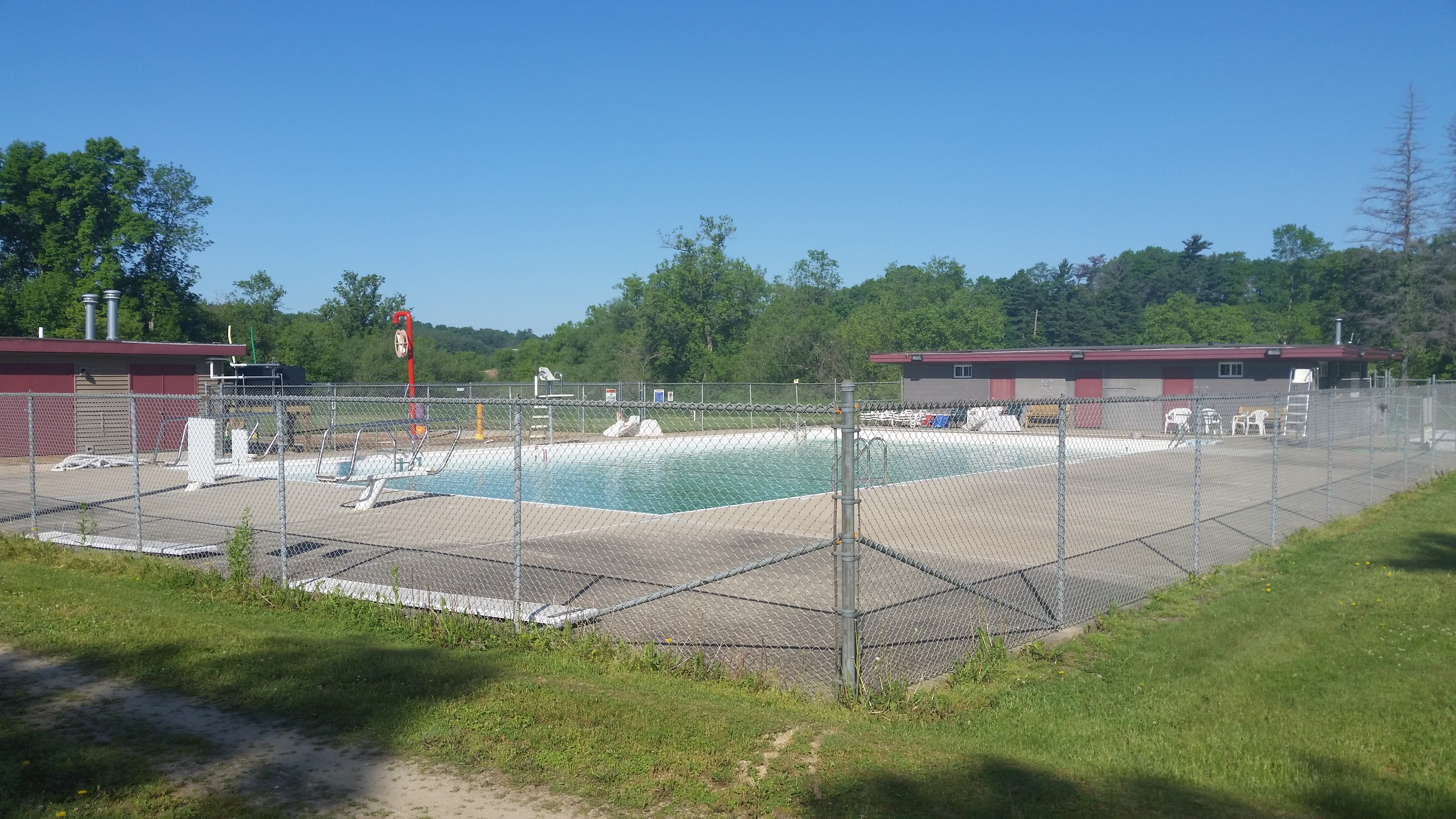
Swimming pool

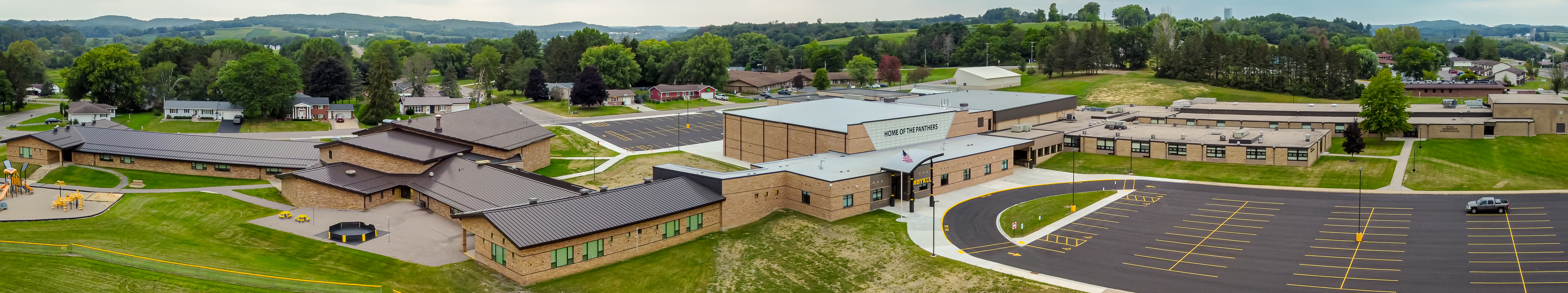
Royall schools

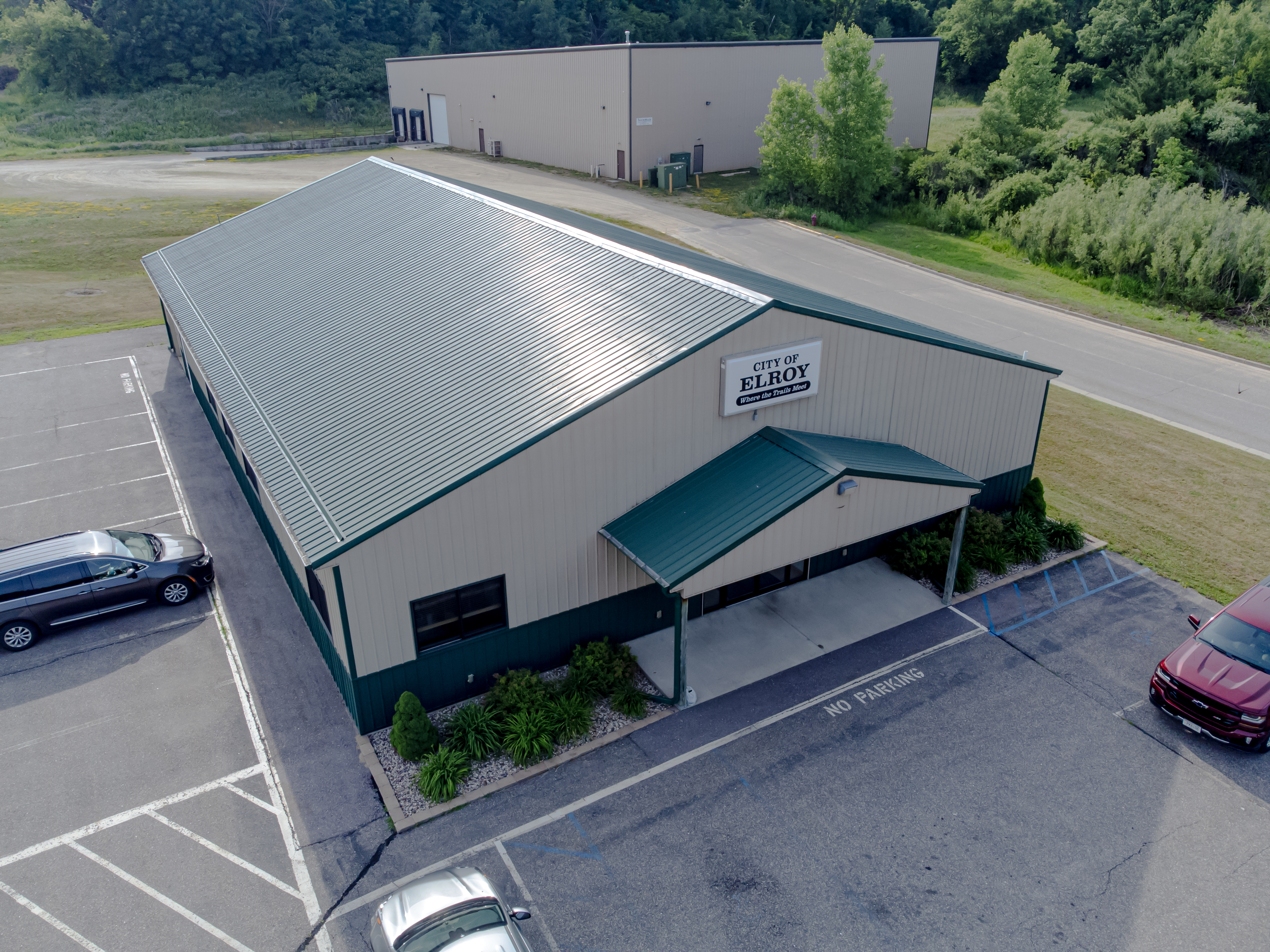
City hall

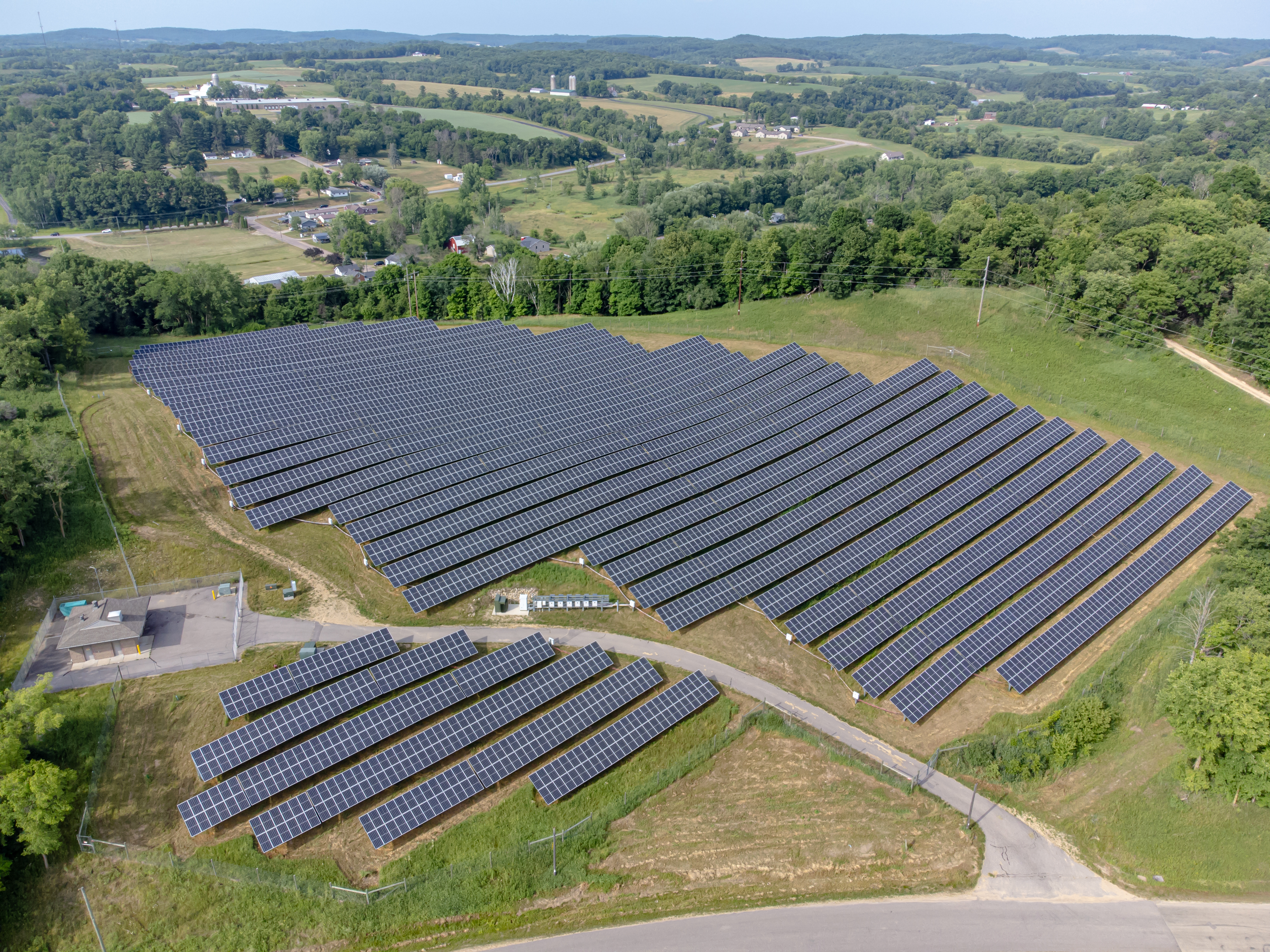
Solar farm

== Notable people ==
- Charles Erwin Booth, Wisconsin State Representative, lived in Elroy
- Peter A. Cleary, Wisconsin State Representative, lived in Elroy
- Peter Egan, columnist was born in Elroy
- John Grimshaw, Wisconsin State Representative, lived in Elroy
- Knut Hamsun, author, lived for a time in Elroy in the early 1880s, during his stay in the United States
- Daniyal Mueenuddin, author, lived part-time on a farm outside Elroy
- Ed Thompson, ran unsuccessfully for Wisconsin governor on the Libertarian ticket in 2002, brother of Tommy Thompson
- Tommy Thompson, Governor of Wisconsin for four terms and the United States Secretary of Health and Human Services during the first term of George W. Bush, was an Elroy resident

== See also ==
- List of geographic names derived from anagrams and ananyms
