= List of rail trails in the United States =

A rail trail is a shared-use path on a railway right of way. Rail trails are typically constructed after a railway has been abandoned and the track has been removed. Rail trails are primarily for non-motorised traffic, although snowmobiles, all-terrain vehicles, e-bikes, and e-scooters may be allowed.

== Multi-state ==
- East Coast Greenway
- Great Allegheny Passage
- Great American Rail-Trail
- Yellowstone Branch Line Trail

== Alabama ==
- Chattahoochee Valley Railroad Trail
- Chief Ladiga Trail
- Hillsboro Trail
- Horse Creek Trail
- Marion Walking Trail
- Old Railroad Bed Trail
- Richard Martin Trail
- Robertsdale Trail
- Swayback Bridge Trail
- Vulcan Trail

== Alaska ==
- Chase Trail
- Iditarod National Historic Trail
- Tony Knowles Coastal Bicycle Trails

== Arizona ==
- Apache Railroad Trail
- Indian Springs Trail
- Iron King Trail
- Mohave and Milltown Railway Trails
- Peavine Trail
- Sonoita Creek Railroad Trail

== Arkansas ==
- Arkadelphia's Feaster Trail
- Big Spring Nature Trail
- Delta Heritage Trail
- Hazen Trail
- Hot Springs Creek Greenway
- Levee Walking Trail
- Little Rock's River Trail
- Marvell Bike Trail
- Old Railroad Trail
- Ouachita National Recreation Trail
- Ozark Highlands Trail

== California ==
- Bizz Johnson Trail in Lassen County, accessible from Susanville.
- Clovis Old Town Trail, runs approximately 7 miles (11 km) on former Southern Pacific right-of-way in Clovis
- Colton Ave. rail-trail, runs approximately 1.7 miles along Colton Ave. and Inland Center Drive in Colton and San Bernardino on former Pacific-Electric right-of-way
- Duarte Bike Trail, spans 1.6 miles from Buena Vista Street to Vineyard Avenue in Duarte, using a portion of Pacific Electric's former Glendora line
- El Dorado Trail
- Fairfield Linear Park
- Great Redwood Trail
- Great Shasta Rail Trail
- Iron Horse Regional Trail
- Joe Rodota Trail 8.5 mi (13.7 km) pedestrian/bicycle path, using the former Petaluma and Santa Rosa Railroad line between Santa Rosa and Sebastopol
- Los Angeles Metro Expo Line
- Marina Green pedestrian/bicycle path, using the portion of the former San Francisco Belt Railroad west of Fort Mason
- Mount Lowe Railroad Trail
- Ohlone Greenway
- Orange Blossom Trail, runs approximately 1.3 miles on former Santa Fe "Kite-Shaped Track" right-of-way in Redlands
- Pacific Electric Trail, spans 19.5 miles from Claremont to Rialto, using a portion of Pacific Electric's former San Bernardino line
- Richmond Greenway
- Santa Clara River Trail
- Sonoma–Marin Area Rail Transit
- South San Francisco Centennial Way
- Sugar Pine Trail, runs approximately 6 miles (9.7 km) on former Southern Pacific right-of-way in Fresno
- Three Creeks Trail
- Union Pacific Railroad right of way in Brea
- Ventura River Parkway Trail 16.5 mi (26.6 km) pedestrian/bicycle/equestrian path, using the former Ventura and Ojai Valley Railroad line between Ventura and Ojai
- Walnut Trail
- West County Trail 5.5 mi (8.9 km) pedestrian/bicycle path, using the former Petaluma and Santa Rosa Railroad line between Sebastopol and Forestville

== Colorado ==
- Alpine Tunnel
- Rio Grande Trail
- Rock Island Trail
- Switzerland Trail
- Manitou Incline is the remains of a former 3 ft (914 mm) narrow gauge funicular railway with an average grade of 45% (24°) and as steep as 68% (34°) in places.

== Connecticut ==
- Air Line State Park Trail
- Branford Trolley Trail
- Farmington Canal Trail
- Farmington River Trail
- Hop River State Park Trail
- Housatonic Rail Trail
- Larkin State Park Trail
- Mattabesset River Bike Path
- Middlebury Greenway
- Moosup Valley State Park Trail
- Quinnipiac River Gorge Trail
- Ridgefield Rail Trail
- Shepaug Greenway

== Delaware ==
- Junction and Breakwater Trail

== Georgia ==
- Atlanta BeltLine
- Fall Line Trace
- Firefly Trail
- Silver Comet Trail

== Idaho ==
- Ashton to Tetonia Trail
- Bill Chipman Palouse Trail
- Ed Corkill Trail
- Latah Trail
- Route of the Hiawatha mountain bike trail
- Trail of the Coeur d'Alenes
- Weiser River Trail
- Wood River Trail
- Yellowstone Branch Line Trail
- Victor to Driggs Rail Trail

== Illinois ==
- Bloomingdale Trail, Wicker Park, Chicago
- Burnham Greenway, Chicago
- Constitution Trail, Bloomington-Normal
- Great River Trail, Savanna to Rock Island
- Great Western Trail, Chicago area
- Green Bay Trail, North Shore suburbs of Chicago
- Illinois Prairie Path, Chicago and vicinity.
- Interurban Trail, Springfield to Chatham
- Jane Addams Trail, Freeport to the Wisconsin state line
- Kickapoo Rail Trail, Urbana to Kickapoo State Recreation Area near Danville
- Long Prairie Trail, Boone County
- Lost Bridge Trail, Springfield to Rochester
- Nickel Plate Trail, New Douglas to Pontoon Beach
- Old Plank Road Trail, Joliet to Chicago Heights
- Pecatonica Prairie Path, Freeport to near Rockford
- Pennsy Greenway, Lansing
- Rock Island Trail State Park, Peoria to Toulon
- Sangamon Valley Trail, Springfield
- Schoolhouse Trail, Madison to Troy
- Skokie Valley Trail, Sauganash community of Chicago to Highland Park
- Stone Bridge Trail: Rockton to the Boone County line
- Tunnel Hill State Trail, Harrisburg to Karnak
- Wabash Trail, Springfield
- Watershed Trail, Roxana to Edwardsville

== Indiana ==
- Big-4 Rail Trail, Whitestown to Zionsville
- B-Line Trail, Bloomington
- B&O Trail, Brownsburg to Indianapolis via Speedway
- Cardinal Greenway, Richmond to Marion via Muncie
- Chessie Trail, LaPorte County
- Coal Line Trail, South Bend
- Erie Lackawanna Trail, Hammond to Crown Point
- Fishing Line Trail, Kendallville, Indiana to Rome City, Indiana
- Hawpatch Trail, LaGrange County
- Indiana-Michigan River Valley Trail (includes LaSalle Trail), Greater South Bend
- Monon Trail, Indianapolis and northern suburbs
- Monon South, Five segments from Marshall to New Albany
- Nickel Plate (North-Central Indiana), Kokomo to Rochester
- Nickel Plate (Indianapolis area), Indianapolis to Noblesville
- Oak Savannah Trail, Griffith to Hobart
- Panhandle Pathway, Cass and Pulaski Counties
- Pennsy Trail, Indianapolis to Greenfield via Cumberland
- Prairie Duneland Trail, Portage to Chesterton
- Pufferbelly Trail, Fort Wayne, Indiana
- Pumpkinvine Nature Trail, Elkhart and Lagrange Counties

== Iowa ==
- Cedar Valley Trail
- Chichaqua Valley Trail
- Great Western Trail
- Heart of Iowa Nature Trail
- Heritage Trail
- High Trestle Trail, formerly Ankeny to Woodward Trail
- Krushchev in Iowa Trail, formerly Corn Diplomacy Trail
- Raccoon River Valley Trail
- Summerset Trail
- Wabash Trace Nature Trail

== Kansas ==
- Blue River Rail Trail
- Flint Hills Nature Trail
- Haskell Rail Trail
- Landon Trail
- Prairie Spirit Trail State Park
- Meadowlark Trail
- Southwind Rail Trail
- Välkommen Trail, entirely within the city limits of Lindsborg

== Kentucky ==
- Big Four Bridge
- Dawkins Line Rail Trail, from Hagerhill to Royalton; when phase two is completed, the trail will extend into Breathitt County
- Paducah and Louisville Rail Trail, connecting Greenville and Central City

=== In planning/under construction ===
- C&O Rail Trail, from Lexington to Coalton
- K&I Bridge, would utilize the former and now abandoned automobile lanes

== Louisiana ==
- Tammany Trace, 31 mile trail on the north shore of Lake Pontchartrain

== Maine ==
- Back Cove Trail (Portland)
- Calais Waterfront Walkway
- Down East Sunrise Trail (Ellsworth—Calais)
- Eastern Promenade Trail (Portland)
- Eastern Trail (Kennebunk—South Portland)
- Kennebec River Rail Trail (Augusta—Gardiner)
- Mountain Division Trail (Oxford County and Cumberland County)
- Papermill Trail (Lisbon)
- Passy Rail Trail (Belfast)
- West Side Trail (Yarmouth)

== Maryland ==
- Allegheny Highlands Trail of Maryland
- Baltimore & Annapolis Trail
- Bethesda Trolley Trail
- Capital Crescent Trail, Maryland and Washington, DC
- Chesapeake Beach Railway Trail
- College Park Trolley Trail
- Cross Island Trail
- Easton Rails-to-Trails
- Indian Head Rail Trail
- Lower Susquehanna Heritage Greenway Trail
- Ma and Pa Trail
- Poplar Avenue Trail, Annapolis (part of former Baltimore and Annapolis Railroad)
- Savage Mill Trail
- Three Notch Trail
- Torrey C. Brown Rail Trail, formerly Northern Central Railroad Trail
- Trolley Line Number 9 Trail
- Washington, Baltimore and Annapolis Trail
- Wayne Gilchrest Trail
- Western Maryland Rail Trail

== Mississippi ==
- Longleaf Trace, Hattiesburg to Prentiss (41 miles)
- Oxford Depot Trail and South Campus Rail Trail
- Tanglefoot Trail, Houston to New Albany (43.6 miles)

== Missouri ==
- Al Foster Trail in west St. Louis County
- Grant's Trail, near Grant's Farm
- Katy Trail, the longest rail trail in the United States
- MKT Trail, Columbia
- Rock Island Trail State Park
- Frisco Highline Trail

== Montana ==
- Centennial Trail (Montana)
- Olympian Trail
- Route of the Hiawatha bike trail
- Yellowstone Branch Line Trail

== Nebraska ==
- Cowboy Trail
- Great Plains Trail Network

== Nevada ==
- Historic Railroad Hiking Trail

== New Hampshire ==
- Ashuelot Rail Trail
- Cheshire Rail Trail
- Common Pathway
- Concord-Lake Sunapee Rail Trail
- Cotton Valley Rail Trail
- Derry Rail Trail
- East Coast Greenway
- Farmington Recreational Rail Trail
- Fort Hill Rail Trail
- Goffstown Rail Trail
- Granite Town Rail Trail
- Hillsborough Recreational Rail Trail
- Industrial Heritage Trail
- Lake Winnisquam Scenic Trail
- Londonderry Rail Trail
- Nashua River Rail Trail
- New Boston Rail Trail
- Northern Rail Trail
- Piscataquog Trail
- Rockingham Recreational Trail
- South Manchester Rail Trail
- Sugar River Recreational Trail (Concord and Claremont Railroad)
- Windham Rail Trail
- WOW Trail

== New Mexico ==
Category:Rail trails in New Mexico

== North Carolina ==
• Atlantic & Yadkin Greenway - 7.8 mile segment that goes to Summerfield, NC

- Charlotte Rail Trail
- American Tobacco Trail
- Railroad Grade Road, a 10-mile paved former section of the VA Creeper Railroad from Todd to Fleetwood
- Thermal Belt Rail Trail
- Neuse River Trail

=== In planning/under construction ===
- Ecusta Trail (Brevard to Hendersonville)
- Durham to Roxboro Rail Trail (Durham to Roxboro)

== Ohio ==
- Aurora Trail, Aurora
- Bike & Hike Trail, Summit County
- Camp Chase Trail, Franklin and Madison Counties
- Chippewa Rail Trail, Medina County
- Cleveland Foundation Centennial Lake Link Trail, Cleveland
- Conotton Creek Trail, Harrison County
- County Line Trail, Wayne County
- Freedom Trail, Summit County
- Galena Brick Trail, Delaware County
- Genoa Township Trail, Delaware County
- Greenway Corridor / Maple Highlands Trail, Lake and Geauga Counties (tandem)
- Headwaters Trail, Portage County
- Heart of Ohio Trail, Knox County
- Hockhocking Adena Bikeway, Athens County
- Holmes County Trail, Holmes County
- Huron River Path MetroPark and Milan Towpath MetroPark, Erie MetroParks, Erie County
- Iron Horse Trail, Montgomery County
- Iron Horse Trail, Stark County
- Kokosing Gap Trail, Knox County
- Little Beaver Creek Greenway Trail, Columbiana County
- Little Miami Bike Trail
- Marion Tallgrass Trail, Marion County
- Mohican Valley Trail, Knox County
- Moonville Rail-Trail, Vinton and Athens Counties
- Morgana Run Trail, Cleveland
- North Coast Inland Trail, Lorain County
- Ohio to Erie Trail, Cincinnati to Columbus to Cleveland
- Pymatuning Valley Greenway Trail, Ashtabula County
- Richland B & O Trail, Richland County
- Sippo Valley Trail, Wayne and Stark Counties
- University/Parks Trail, Lucas County
- Wabash Cannonball Trail, Williams County, Fulton County, Lucas County, and Henry County
- Western Reserve Greenway Trail, Ashtabula County

=== In planning/under construction ===
- B&O Trail, Athens County; ten miles of recently purchased former B&O railroad grade in the eastern county; a Washington County group (MATAC) is working on an extension into Washington County
- Owl Creek Trail, Knox County

== Oregon ==
- Banks–Vernonia State Trail
- Crown Zellerbach (CZ) Trail
- Deschutes River Trail
- OC&E Woods Line State Trail
- Row River National Recreation Trail
- Springwater Corridor
- Trolley Trail

== Rhode Island ==
- Blackstone Valley Rail
- East Bay Bike Path
- Narragansett Pier Railroad right of way
  - William C. O'Neill Bike Path
- Providence, Hartford and Fishkill railroad right of way
  - Trestle Trail, the unpaved section of the Coventry Greenway that extends to the Connecticut border
  - Washington Secondary Bike Path / Rail Trail, commonly referred to as Cranston Bike Path, Warwick Bike Path, West Warwick Bike Path and Coventry Greenway

== South Carolina ==
- Doodle Trail, Pickens County, connects the towns of Easley and Pickens; opened in 2015
- North Augusta Greeneway, North Augusta
- Savannah Valley Railroad Trail, northwest of McCormick to Willington
- Swamp Rabbit Trail, Greenville County
- Triple C Rail Trail, a 23-mile (37 km) rail trail spanning Cherokee and York counties
- West Ashley Greenway, Charleston
- Peak to Prosperity Passage of the Palmetto Trail, Newberry County, South Carolina
- Wateree Passage of the Palmetto Trail, Sumter County, South Carolina

=== In planning/under construction ===
- Spanish Moss Trail, northern Beaufort County; the initial three miles (of 20 miles proposed) of trail have been completed, using previous Port Royal Railroad right-of-way, currently owned by BJWSA

== South Dakota ==
- George S. Mickelson Trail

== Tennessee ==
- Clarksville Greenway, trail in Clarksville using the former Tennessee Central railbed.
- Cumberland River Bicentennial Trail, a trail that runs from downtown Nashville to Ashland City
- Railroad Grade Road, a five-mile long paved road/trail; a former section of the old East Tennessee and Western North Carolina line west of Roan Mountain
- Shelby Farms Greenline, a 6.6 mile trail using the previous CSX Rail right-of-way in Shelby County; an additional 7 miles are planned.
- Tennessee Central Trail, a 4.3-mile (6.9 km) trail currently connecting Cookeville and Algood, with future plans to extend to Monterey and Baxter
- Tweetsie Trail, a 10.0 mile trail connecting Johnson City and Elizabethton, a former section of the old East Tennessee and Western North Carolina Railroad
- Vollintine and Evergreen (V&E greenline), a 1.7 mile trail using the former L&N Rail right-of-way in Memphis

=== In planning/under construction ===
- Greater Memphis Greenline, a system of trails in the Memphis area

== Texas ==
- Caprock Canyons State Park and Trailway, a 64.25 mile trail 100 miles southeast of Amarillo
- Denton Branch Rail Trail, 8 mile trail
- Harrisburg-Sunset Trail, 5 mile trail in Houston
- Katy Trail, a 3.5 mile recreational trail that runs along the abandoned right-of-way of the Missouri-Kansas-Texas (Katy) Railroad in Dallas
- Lake Mineral Wells State Trailway, a 20-mile trail 50 miles west of Fort Worth
- MKT Hike and Bike Trail, 6 miles, Houston Heights
- Northeast Texas Trail, 130 miles under construction with 70 non-continuous miles open, between Farmersville (20 miles east of DFW metroplex) and New Boston (Arkansas border)

=== In planning/under construction ===
- Columbia Tap, 4 miles, Houston

== Utah ==
- Denver & Rio Grande Western Rail Trail, 23.5 miles along the former D&RGW right of way in Davis County
- Historic Union Pacific Rail Trail State Park, 28 miles along the Union Pacific Railway between Park City and Echo Reservoir
- Porter Rockwell Trail, 3.5 miles along the Union Pacific Railway, Draper & Sandy
- Provo River Parkway Trail, about 6.6 miles of Rio Grande Western Railway (Heber Creeper) from Provo River Bottoms to Vivian Park in Provo Canyon

=== In planning/under construction ===
- Parley's Trail, 8 mile trail between Sugar House and the Jordan River, mostly along the D&RGW Sugar House Branch corridor

== Vermont ==
- Cross Vermont Trail
- Delaware & Hudson Rail-Trail
- Island Line Trail
- Lamoille Valley Rail Trail
- Missisquoi Valley Rail Trail

== Virginia ==
- Bluemont Junction Trail
- Chessie Nature Trail
- Dahlgren Railroad Heritage Trail
- Guest River Gorge Trail
- High Bridge Trail State Park
- Huckleberry Trail
- Jackson River Scenic Trail
- Mendota Trail
- New River Trail
- Salt Trail
- Tobacco Heritage Trail
- Virginia Capital Trail, 2 mile portion near downtown Richmond, of 52 miles total.
- Virginia Central Railway Trail
- Virginia Creeper Trail
- Warrenton Branch Greenway
- Washington & Old Dominion Railroad Trail
- Wilderness Road State Park

=== In planning/under construction ===
- Blue Ridge Railway Trail
- Blue Ridge Tunnel
- Dahlgren Railroad Heritage Trail
- Eastern Shore of Virginia Rail Trail
- Fall Line Trail

== Washington, D.C. ==
- Capital Crescent Trail, Maryland and Washington, D.C.
- Metropolitan Branch Trail, Maryland and Washington, D.C.

== Wisconsin ==
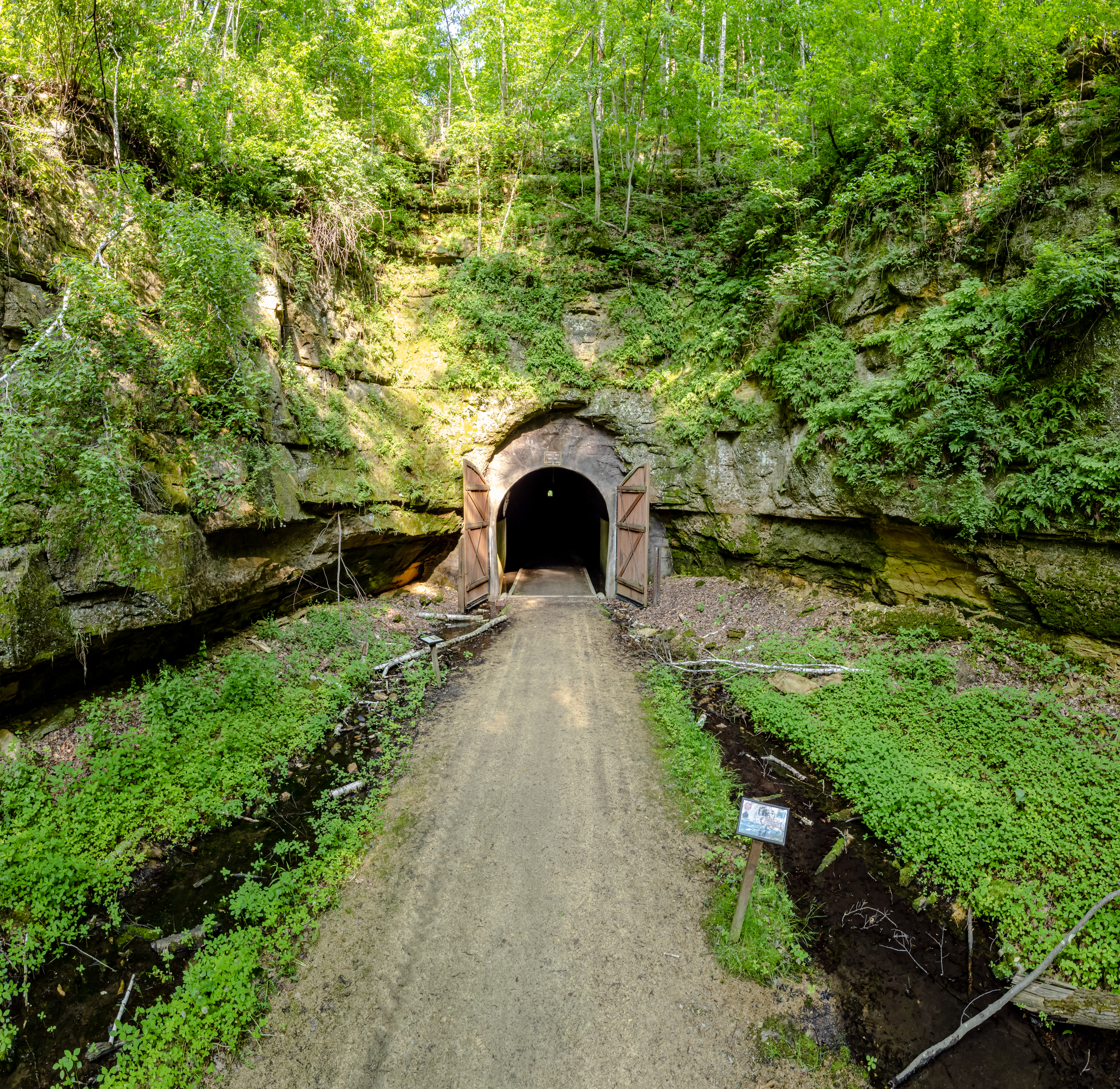
Elroy-Sparta State Trail tunnel 1 of 3

- 400 State Trail
- Ahnapee State Trail
- Badger State Trail
- Bearskin State Trail
- Bugline Trail
- Capital City State Trail
- Chippewa River State Trail
- Devil's River State Trail
- Duck Creek Trail
- Eisenbahn State Trail
- Elroy-Sparta State Trail
- Friendship State Trail (Partial)
- Fox River State Recreational Trail
- Gandy Dancer State Trail
- Glacial Drumlin State Trail
- Great River State Trail
- Hank Aaron State Trail
- La Crosse River Trail
- Lake Country Trail
- Military Ridge State Trail
- Mountain-Bay State Trail
- New Berlin Trail
- Newton Blackmour State Trail
- Old Abe State Trail
- Oconto River State Trail
- Omaha Trail
- Osaugee Recreational Trail
- Ozaukee Interurban Trail
- Pine Line Trail
- Red Cedar State Trail
- Saunders State Trail
- Sugar River State Trail
- Tri-County Recreational Corridor
- Tuscobia State Trail
- White River State Trail
- Wild Goose State Trail

== Wyoming ==
- City of Casper Trail System, includes several miles of former Union Pacific rail line converted to concrete and gravel paths stretching from the downtown area, east into Evansville
