= Little Calfpasture River =

Location
- Country: United States

Physical characteristics
- Source
  - location: Virginia
- Mouth
  - location: Goshen, Virginia
  - coordinates: 37.94930°N 79.45948°W
- Length: 23.7 mi (38.1 km)

The Little Calfpasture River is a 23.7-mile-long (38.1 km) tributary of the Maury River in the U.S. state of Virginia. It is part of the James River watershed.

== Background ==
The river rises east of Elliott Knob on Great North Mountain in the Allegheny Mountains of western Virginia, in Augusta County. Flowing southwest between North Mountain and Little North Mountain, the Little Calfpasture enters Rockbridge County and joins the Calfpasture River to form the Maury River just upstream of Goshen Pass, a water gap through Little North Mountain.

The Little Calfpasture River passes the village of Augusta Springs and the town of Craigsville along its course. It passes through the Goshen Scout Reservation and is dammed to form Lake Merriweather.

== See also ==
- Lake Merriweather
- List of rivers of Virginia
