= Goshen Scout Reservation =

Boys Scouts of America reservation

- Owner: National Capital Area Council
- Location: 340 Millard Burke Memorial Highway (VA Route 601); Goshen, Virginia 22439
- Coordinates: 37.967°N 79.4695°W
- Camp size: 4,000-acre (16 km^{2})
- Founded: 1967
- Website; GoToGoshen.org

Goshen Scout Reservation is a Boy Scout reservation designated for camping, swimming, hiking and other activities. Goshen is home to six Boy Scouts of America resident summer camps located near Goshen, Virginia, and is owned and operated by the National Capital Area Council. The camps are all built around Lake Merriweather. Opened to Scouts in the summer of 1967, today it has six different camps covering over 4,000 acres (16 km^{2}) of land. Within Goshen there are three Boy Scout camps, two Cub Scout camps, and one high adventure camp.

== History ==
In 1960, the National Capital Area Council purchased land that bordered the Goshen and Little North Mountain Wildlife Management Area and Little Calfpasture River outside of Goshen, Virginia for $300,000. U.S. Steel public relations executive William G. Whyte helped acquire this tract of more than 4,000 acres (6.3 sq mi) for the Scouts. The 425-acre (0.7 sq mi) Lake Merriweather was created by damming the Little Calfpasture River in 1966, before it joins with the Calfpasture to become the Maury, with a structure 38 feet (12 m) high and 1,300 feet (396 m) long. Lake Merriweather was named for Marjorie Merriweather Post, an ardent supporter of Scouting in the Washington, DC area. The individual camps bear the names of other significant individuals or corporations who supported National Capital Scouting as well. Camp Marriott owes its name to the Marriott International hospitality corporation while Camp PMI refers to Parking Management Incorporated (better known as PMI), a large parking company in the DC Metro region. In commemoration of the 50th anniversary of the reservation, the council hosted a camporee for youth, alumni, and families on Memorial Day weekend 2017.

== High Adventure Camp ==
=== Camp Baird ===
Camp Baird is the base camp for the Lenhok'sin High Adventure program. Lenhok'sin offers "backpacking, caving, rappelling, horsemanship, black powder rifle shooting, fishing, and canoeing" The backpacking typically takes five days to travel over the "rough terrain in the Alleghany Mountains."

== Boy Scout Camps ==
=== Camp Bowman ===
Camp Bowman was the first camp to be built on the Goshen Scout Reservation, and is located directly across Lake Merriweather from Camp Olmsted. "Camp Bowman's entrance is just beyond the dam that compounds water for the lake."

==== Programs ====
For four weeks each summer the camp is visited by 500 participants. Camp Bowman is the only camp at the Goshen Scout Reservation where all units use patrol cooking, rather than dining hall or meals picked up like take-out (Note: depending on location called take-out, takeout, carry-out, take-away, or parcel meals) in a system that reservation camps call heater stack. Each patrol cooks at their campsite using a propane stove or campfire.

==== Facilities ====
Camp facilities include structures for administration, aquatics (Note: Chris Lantos Waterfront), archery range, campfire amphitheater, chapel, commissary, handicraft pavilion, leader lounge, nature, parade field, quartermaster, rifle range, Scoutcraft, shooting sports, shotgun range, shower house, and water tank.

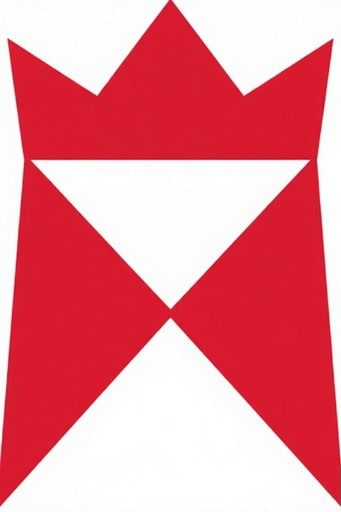
Current Symbol of Camp Marriott, originally based of off a Black Widow spider.

=== Camp Marriott ===
Camp Marriott is one of the seven camps on the Goshen Scout Reservation. Originally founded in 1969, the camp was named after the Marriott family, whom gave large sums of money to the Boy Scouts of America.

==== Programs ====
Camp Marriott contains twelve campsites. There are two rifle pavilions, a shotgun range, and one archery range. The waterfront area is one of the largest on the lake, with close proximity to the administration building. For four weeks each summer the camp is visited by 700 participants. Camp Marriott is the only camp at the Goshen Scout Reservation to offer a full provisional camp, where individual scouts come to form a temporary troop for the week of program.

=== Camp Olmsted ===
Named after General George H. Olmsted, Camp Olmsted has a Tech Center where technology related merit badges are taught.

== Webelos camps ==
=== Camp PMI ===
Camp P.M.I. is a camp for 9- to 10-year-old Webelos located in the Shenandoah Valley near Goshen, Virginia. It has been closed since 2020.

=== Camp Ross ===
Camp Ross is the only operating Webelo camp at Goshen Scout Reservations. It is the farthest one away from Camp Post.

== Other camps ==
=== Camp Post ===
Camp Post is the central administration area, home to several intercamp programs such as Project COPE, which includes a climbing tower and ropes course. It is also home to many administrative staff, including the reservation director and camping specialist. Camp Post is named for Marjorie Merriweather Post.

=== Family Camp ===
Family Camp is a now unused camp which can be used upon request by individuals and groups. It is located almost directly across from Camp Ross waterfront and functions as the Camp Baird Waterfront as well as the Lenhok'sin Caving Outpost during the summer.

== See also ==
- Goshen Pass
- Goshen Pass Natural Area Preserve
