= Goshen Pass Natural Area Preserve =

Protected area in Virginia, US

- IUCN category V (protected landscape/seascape)
- Location within Virginia
- Location: Rockbridge County, Virginia
- Nearest city: Goshen
- Coordinates: 37°56′24″N 79°26′02″W
- Area: 936 acres (3.79 km^{2})
- Established: 2001
- Governing body: Virginia Department of Conservation and Recreation

Goshen Pass Natural Area Preserve is a 936-acre (3.79 km^{2}) Natural Area Preserve located in Rockbridge County, Virginia. The oldest state-managed natural area in Virginia, it was first acquired in 1954 to help protect views of the gorge along the Maury River. The site contains stands of chestnut oak, pine-oak-heath woodland, rocky scrub communities, regionally rare plants such as freshwater cordgrass (Spartina pectinata), and habitat for the Appalachian jewelwing, a locally rare damselfly. The site was dedicated as a preserve in 2001.

Goshen Pass Natural Area Preserve is owned and maintained by the Virginia Department of Conservation and Recreation. The preserve is open to the public; however, as it is contiguous with the Goshen and Little North Mountain Wildlife Management Area (WMA), a WMA access permit is required for parking.

== See also ==
- Goshen Pass
- Goshen Scout Reservation
- List of Virginia Natural Area Preserves
