= Goshen Land Company Bridge =

- U.S. National Register of Historic Places
- Virginia Landmarks Register
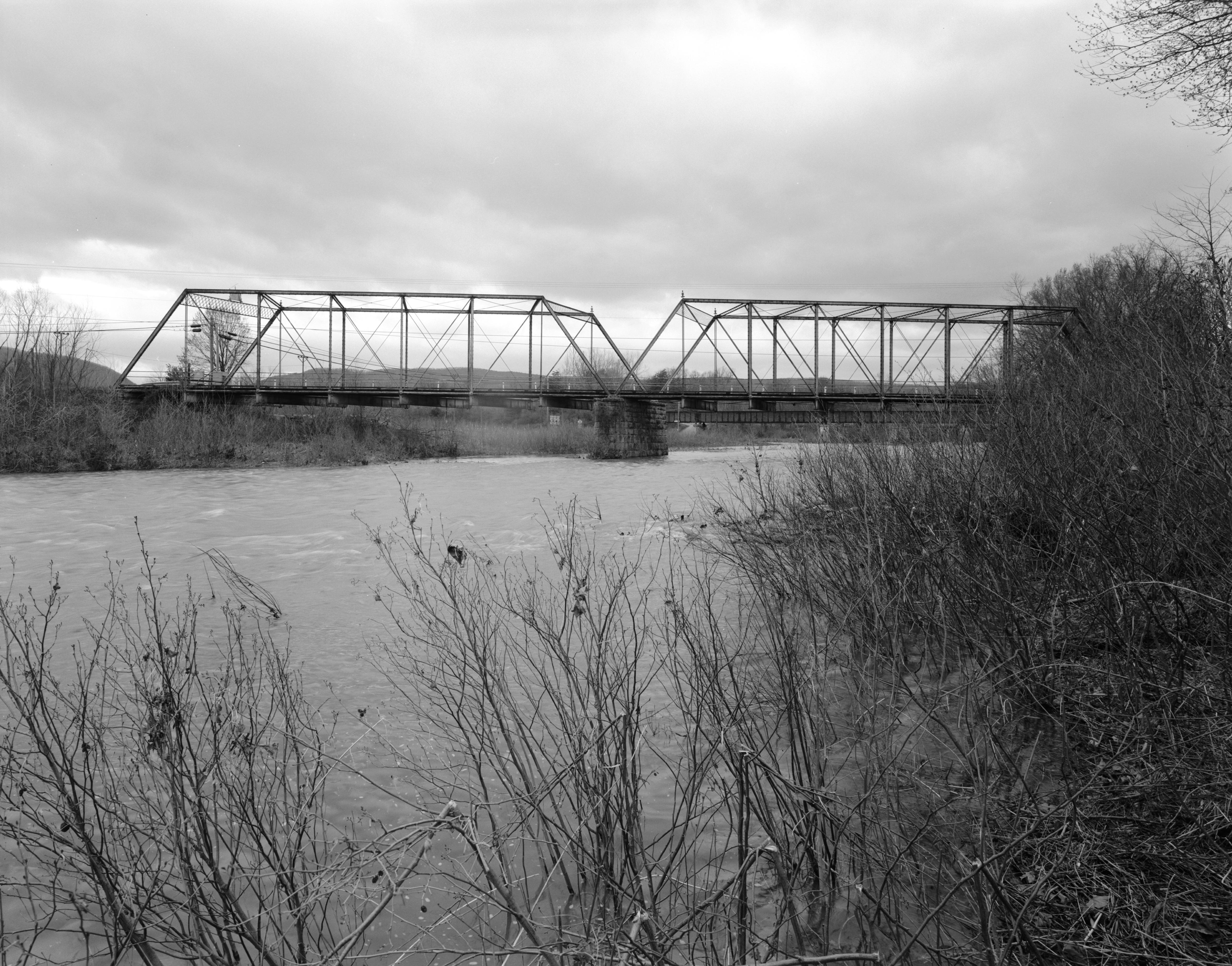
- Goshen Bridge, HAER Photo, April 1994

- Location within Virginia Location within the United States
- Location: E of Goshen on VA 746, near Goshen, Virginia
- Coordinates: 37°59′08″N 79°29′38″W
- Area: less than one acre
- Built: 1890
- Built by: Groton Bridge Co.
- Architectural style: Through Pratt Truss Bridge
- NRHP reference No.: 78003041
- VLR No.: 226-5001

Significant dates
- Added to NRHP: May 15, 1978
- Designated VLR: November 15, 1977

Goshen Land Company Bridge is a historic Pratt through truss bridge spanning the Calfpasture River near Goshen, in Rockbridge County, Virginia, United States. Built in 1890 by the Groton Bridge Company, it consists of two spans, one measuring 138 feet 10 inches (42.32 m) long and the second measuring 120 feet 10 inches (36.83 m); both spans sit at a 30-degree skew.

The bridge was listed on the National Register of Historic Places in 1978.

== See also ==
- List of bridges documented by the Historic American Engineering Record in Virginia
- List of bridges on the National Register of Historic Places in Virginia
