= Maury River =

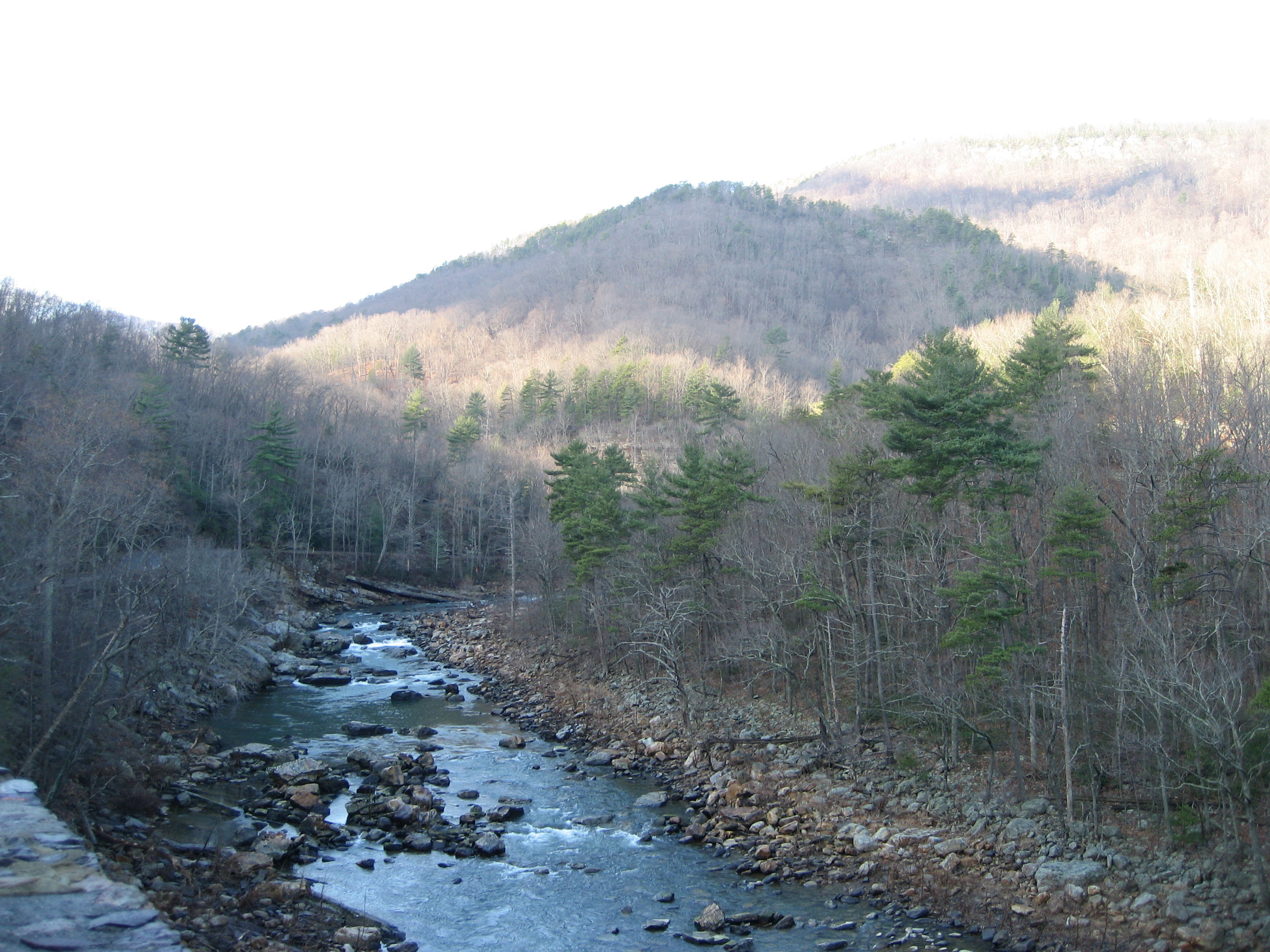
- Maury River at Goshen Pass

Location
- Country: United States

Physical characteristics
- Source
  - location: Confluence of Calfpasture and Little Calfpasture Rivers
  - coordinates: 37°56′57″N 79°27′35″W
  - elevation: 1,430 feet (440 m)
- Mouth
  - location: James River at Glasgow, Virginia
  - coordinates: 37°37′26″N 79°26′39″W
  - elevation: 679 feet (207 m)
- Length: 43 mi (69 km)

The Maury River is a 42.8-mile-long (68.9 km) tributary of the James River in west-central Virginia in the United States. It is part of the watershed of the Chesapeake Bay.

== Course ==
The Maury flows for its entire length in Rockbridge County. It is formed near Goshen by the confluence of the Calfpasture and Little Calfpasture rivers, and flows south past Lexington and Buena Vista; between the cities it collects the South River. The Maury flows into the James River at Glasgow.

== History ==
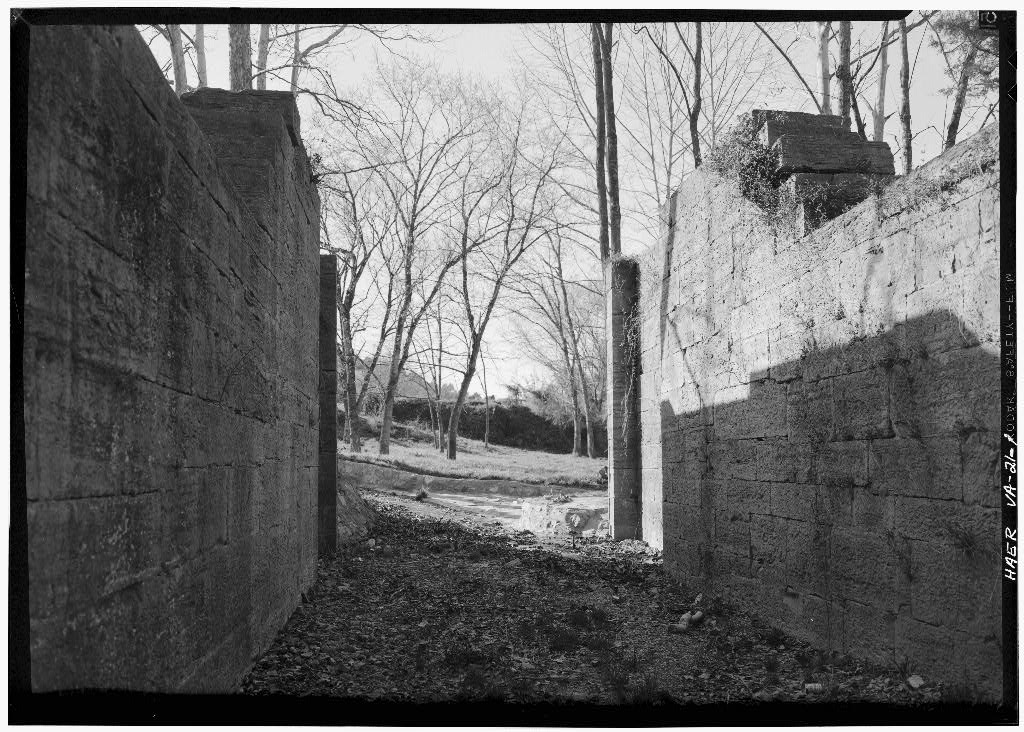
Ben Salem Lock on the Maury River near Lexington

The Maury River formed a portion of an all-water route from the Atlantic ports of Virginia to Lexington from the late 18th to the late 19th century, primarily carrying passengers, pig iron, and agricultural products. Connected to the James River and Kanawha Canal at Glasgow, a series of canals, locks and dams allowed merchant and passenger James River bateaux to travel the shallow, rocky river. The first canal boat reached Lexington in 1860.

The era of the canal ended fairly quickly (around 1880) along the river, as the Richmond and Alleghany Railroad and later Shenandoah Valley Railroad both built rail lines along major portions of the river which offered faster and easier transportation. Numerous artifacts remain from the canal days including several lock and dam ruins. The lock at Ben Salem Wayside between Buena Vista and Interstate 81 on U.S. Route 60 is well preserved in a park setting. At least two dams from the canal era remain and impound water, Moomaw's Lock and Dam below the US 60 bridge in Buena Vista, and the Lexington Mills Dam at Jordan's Point in Lexington which formed the end of canal boat navigation. Several other lock and dam ruins, some almost complete dams, are visible along the river from the Chessie Nature Trail. The Gooseneck Dam downstream of Buena Vista is notable for being featured in a photograph by acclaimed 1950s railroad photographer O. Winston Link.

The Maury River was called the "North River" until it was renamed by an act of the Virginia General Assembly in 1945 (H.B. 39). The United States Board on Geographic Names voted to approve the change in the river's name in 1968 to bring Federal usage into accord with Virginia law. According to the Geographic Names Information System, the stream (or sections thereof) has been known historically as the "North River" and "Calfpasture River". It is named in honor of Commodore Matthew Fontaine Maury, and it travels past Lexington's Washington and Lee University and Virginia Military Institute, where Commodore Maury worked in his last years. There is a memorial tablet in stone to the commodore at Goshen Pass.

== Floods ==
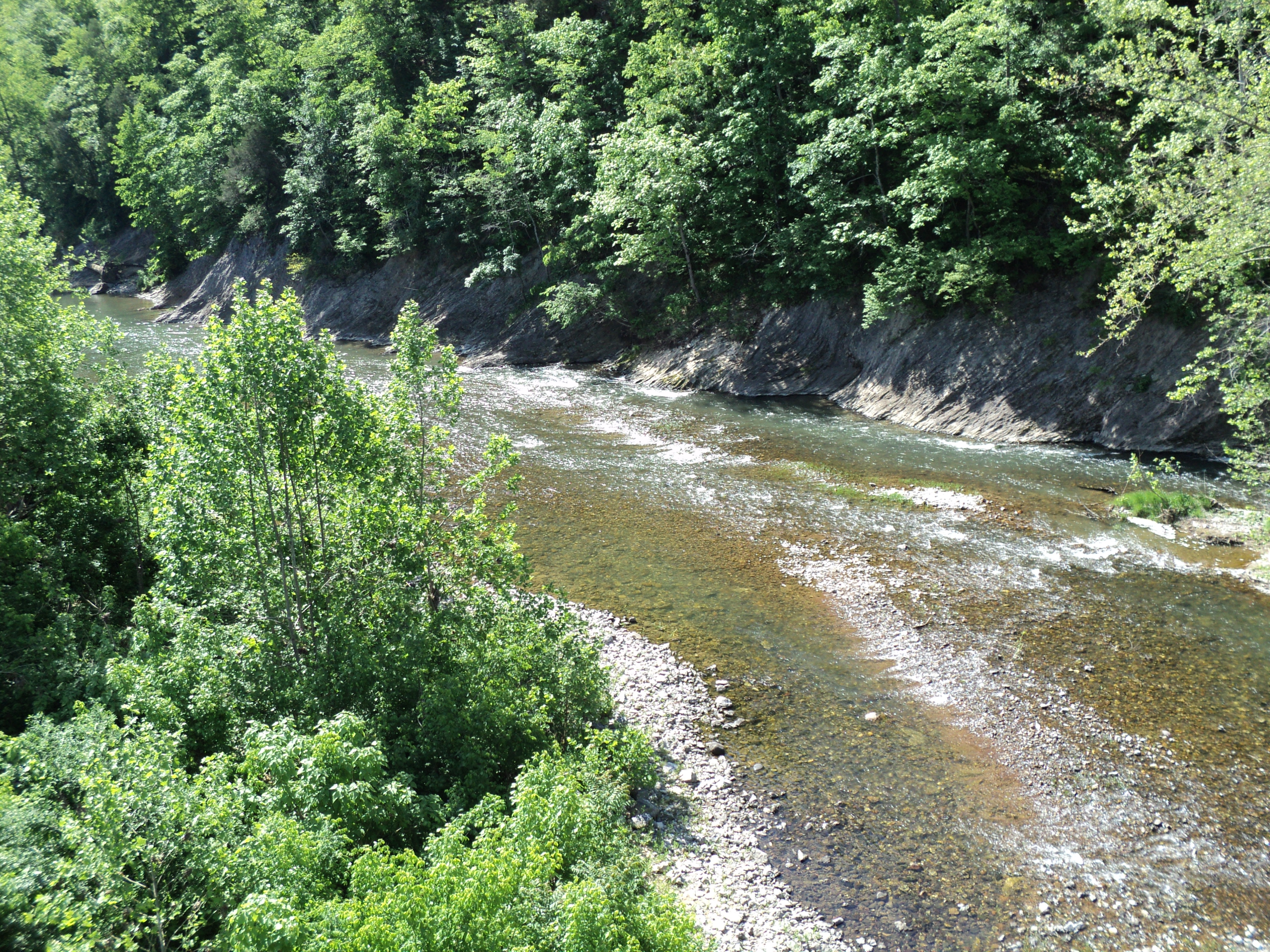
View of Maury River, Lexington, Rockbridge County, Virginia

The Maury River has a history of destructive floods damaging nearby communities. Particularly notable were floods on October 12, 1870, on the death of Robert E. Lee, when the Maury River provided Lee a temporary coffin due to a dock washed away upriver; and in 1936, 1969, 1985 and 1995. The Flood of '69 was the result of rainfall from the inland movement of Hurricane Camille. The Flood of '85 resulted from the convergence of three systems, including Hurricane Juan, which dumped tremendous amounts of rain on western Virginia. The flood of record for the lower Maury River (downstream of the confluence with the South River) including Buena Vista and Glasgow occurred on August 20, 1969, at a stage of 31.23 feet (9.52 m) on the Buena Vista gauge (flooding begins at 17.0 feet (5.2 m) and major flooding at 21.0 feet (6.4 m). The downtowns of Buena Vista and Glasgow were submerged in over 5 feet (1.5 m) of water. The upper Maury River including Lexington saw its flood of record during the Flood of 1985 when the gauging station at Rockbridge Baths recorded a value of 19.19 feet (5.85 m) from flood marks. The difference in flooding results from differing contributions of the South River depending on rainfall in the respective watersheds.

The damage caused by the 1969 flood permanently ended railroad service to Lexington. The tracks of Richmond & Allegany Railroad successor Chesapeake & Ohio Railroad which ran along the bank of the river from its junction with the Norfolk & Western Railroad at Loch Laird (Buena Vista) to Lexington were destroyed along much of the route. Instead of rebuilding the line to Lexington, the C&O Railroad restored the tracks from Loch Laird through Buena Vista to serve several industrial customers. On September 1, 1970, the Interstate Commerce Commission granted the C&O permission to abandon the remainder of the Lexington branch. The C&O (now CSX Transportation) tracks end at Georgia Bonded Fibers below the US 60 bridge over the Maury River. The remaining rail bed was converted to public use as an early example of rails to trails, becoming the Chessie Nature Trail.

The James C. Olin Flood Control Project was completed in 1997 to reduce the potential for damage from flooding of the Maury River and inland streams in Buena Vista.

== Recreation ==
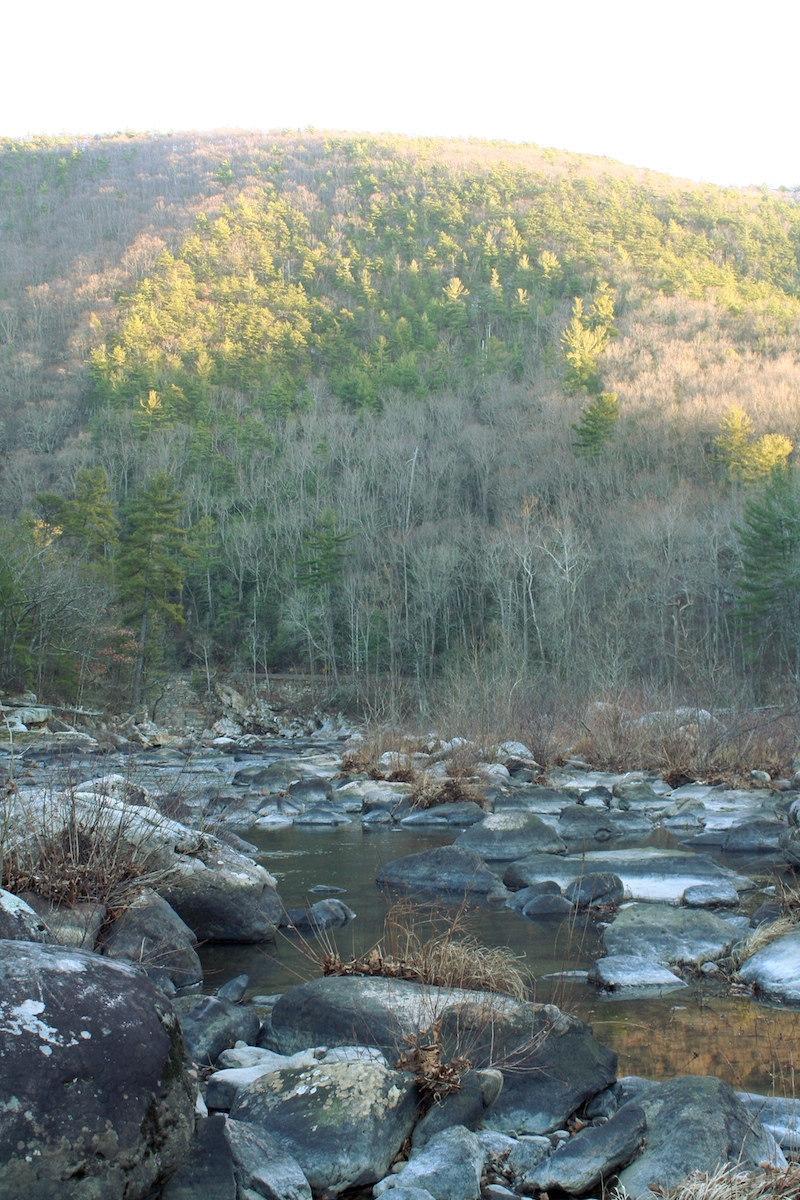
Maury River at Goshen Pass

The Chessie Nature Trail parallels the river to form a seven-mile (11 km) linear park between Buena Vista and Lexington. The rail trail winds through scenic mixed hardwood forests and open pastures along the river. Other notable parks along the river include Goshen Pass, Jordan's Point in Lexington, Ben Salem Wayside, and Glenn Maury Park in Buena Vista.

State-owned public lands along the river include the Goshen and Little North Mountain Wildlife Management Area and the Goshen Pass Natural Area Preserve.

The river is enjoyed by residents and visitors through swimming, fishing, canoeing, kayaking, and floating downstream in inner tubes. The river is largely wide and shallow, typically less than three feet (0.91 m) deep with occasional deep holes. The upper portion of the river includes class II, III and IV rapids. Below Jordan's Point in Lexington, the river is mainly a float trip with Class I and II rapids to the James River at Glasgow. Electric or gasoline-powered boats are rarely used beyond a few areas of slack water upstream of dams.

== See also ==
- List of Virginia rivers
- Buffalo Creek (Maury River)
