= Panhandle Pathway =

Coordinates: 41°02′43.0″N 86°36′6.9″W

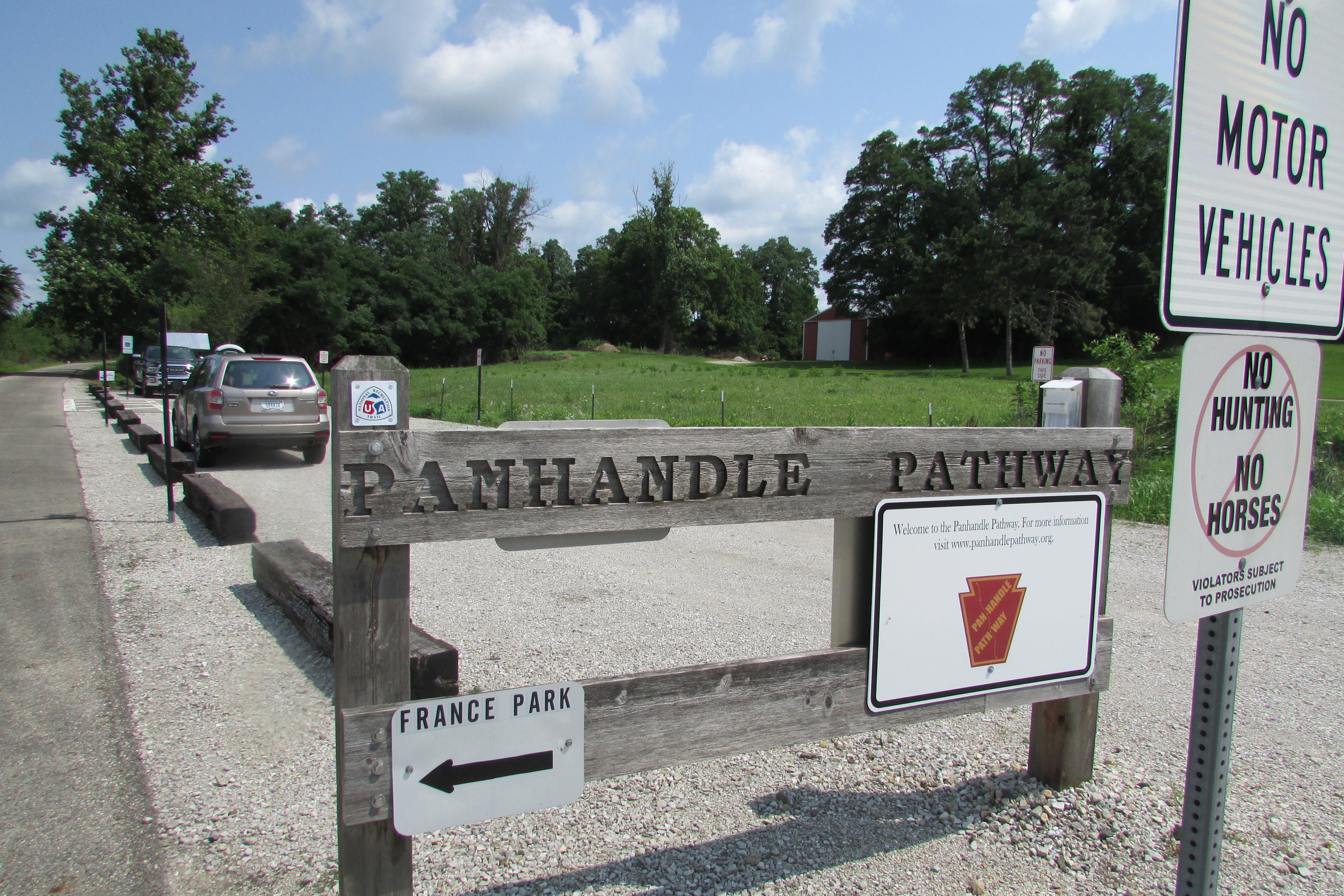
- Panhandle Pathway trailhead sign at Cass County Route 50 North in July 2021
- Length: 21.5 mi (34.6 km)
- Location: Indiana, United States
- Website: Panhandle Pathway site

The Panhandle Pathway is a rail to trail conversion in north central Indiana, United States. It is about 21 miles (34 km) long and runs along the former Pennsylvania Railroad Panhandle line. At the north, the trail begins in the town of Winamac, Indiana, and closely parallels U.S. Highway 35 toward its south terminus in Kenneth, west of Logansport. It connects to other rail trails at a few locations along its route. Construction of the trail was partially funded by Federal grant money awarded to the state of Indiana.

As of August 2015, the trail is accessible from parking areas in Winamac, Star City, and Royal Center. The pathway has a trailhead near its south terminus at Cass County roads 50 North & 600 West. There is overflow parking at the church nearby. The trailhead has a portable toilet, but no drinking water.

The south end of the trail terminates near the right-of-way for the Toledo, Peoria and Western Railway near Kenneth, Indiana. There are plans to extend the trail to France Park, but negotiations have stalled in part due to safety concerns for trail users crossing the railway. Officials with the City of Logansport are also seeking to build a connection with the Nickel Plate Trail.
