= Pennsy Trail =

Rail trail in Indiana, US

- Length: 15.5 miles (24.9 km)
- Location: Indiana
- Trailheads: Indianapolis; Greenfield
- Use: Hiking, biking, rollerblading
- Season: Year round
- Surface: Asphalt
- Right of way: Pennsylvania Railroad

The Pennsy Trail is a shared-use path and rail trail that parallels the Historic National Road between Greenfield, Indiana, and Ellenberger Park in the Irvington neighborhood of Indianapolis. The trail runs along a railbed of the Pennsylvania Railroad, from which the trail gets its name.

The trail is divided into two sections, a 6.7-mile (10.8 km) western section which runs through Indianapolis and Cumberland, and a 5.5-mile (8.9 km) eastern section that runs through Greenfield. As of 2025, the only remaining gap between the eastern and western sections is a 1-mile (1.6 km) stretch between county roads 300W and 150W in Hancock County.

== History ==
The first section of the trail was completed in 1998 between Center Street and Morristown Pike in Greenfield. The rest of the Greenfield section was completed between 2002 and 2009.

== See also ==
- List of rail trails in the United States
- Pleasant Run Greenway
- Transportation in Indianapolis
