= Goshen and Little North Mountain Wildlife Management Area =

Protected area of Virginia, United States

- IUCN category V (protected landscape/seascape)
- Location within Virginia Location within the United States
- Location: Rockbridge and Augusta counties, Virginia
- Nearest city: Staunton
- Coordinates: 38°02′14″N 79°21′24″W
- Area: 33,697 acres (136.37 km^{2})
- Governing body: Virginia Department of Game and Inland Fisheries

Goshen and Little North Mountain Wildlife Management Area is a protected area located in Rockbridge and Augusta counties, Virginia. At 33,697 acres (136.37 km^{2}), it is the largest Wildlife Management Area managed by the Virginia Department of Game and Inland Fisheries. The area comprises two parcels of land bisected by the Maury River; the lowest terrain is 1,326 feet (404 m) above sea level, while the highest is 3,400 feet (1,000 m). Three major mountains (Bratton, Forge, and Hogback) are found within the heavily forested area, in addition to a lesser amount of native herbaceous habitat.

Goshen and Little North Mountain Wildlife Management Area lies adjacent to George Washington National Forest and the Goshen Pass Natural Area Preserve. It is open to the public for hunting, trapping, fishing, hiking, horseback riding, and primitive camping. Access for persons 17 years of age or older requires a valid hunting or fishing permit, or a WMA access permit.

== See also ==
- List of Virginia Wildlife Management Areas
