= Dahlgren Railroad Heritage Trail =

Coordinates: 38°16′3″N 77°17′55″W

- Map of the Dahlgren Railroad Heritage Trail
- Length: 15.7 mi (25.3 km)
- Location: King George County, Virginia, United States
- Trailheads: State Route 605 (Bloomsbury Road)/ near State Route 614 (Owens Road)
- Use: Hiking, bicycling, horseback riding

The Dahlgren Railroad Heritage Trail (DRHT) is a trail that follows an old railroad bed in King George County, Virginia.

== History ==
The railroad line was built by the federal government during World War II to serve a United States Navy base in Dahlgren; the line was later sold to the Richmond, Fredericksburg and Potomac Railroad and subsequently CSX Transportation before being abandoned.

The trail opened with a ribbon-cutting ceremony on June 6, 2006. In 2018 the trail's owner, David Brickley, and the volunteer Friends of the Dahlgren Railroad Heritage Trail signed an agreement making the trail part of King George County’s park system while still owned by Brickley and maintained by the friend's group. The County continues to support Virginia’s acquisition of the Dahlgren Railroad Heritage Trail and have it connected as a linear trail extension of Caledon State Park.

== Trail description ==
The DRHT is a 15.7-mile (25.3 km) trail from the western edge of King George County to the Naval Surface Warfare Center, Dahlgren Division. Intended for use as a public "Rails-to-Trails" project, the trail winds through rural King George and accommodates non-motorized, recreational users including hikers, bikers, horseback riders, and runners.

The Dahlgren Trail has been designated a National Recreation Trail and part of the Potomac Heritage National Scenic Trail.
