= France Park =

Park in Logansport, Indiana

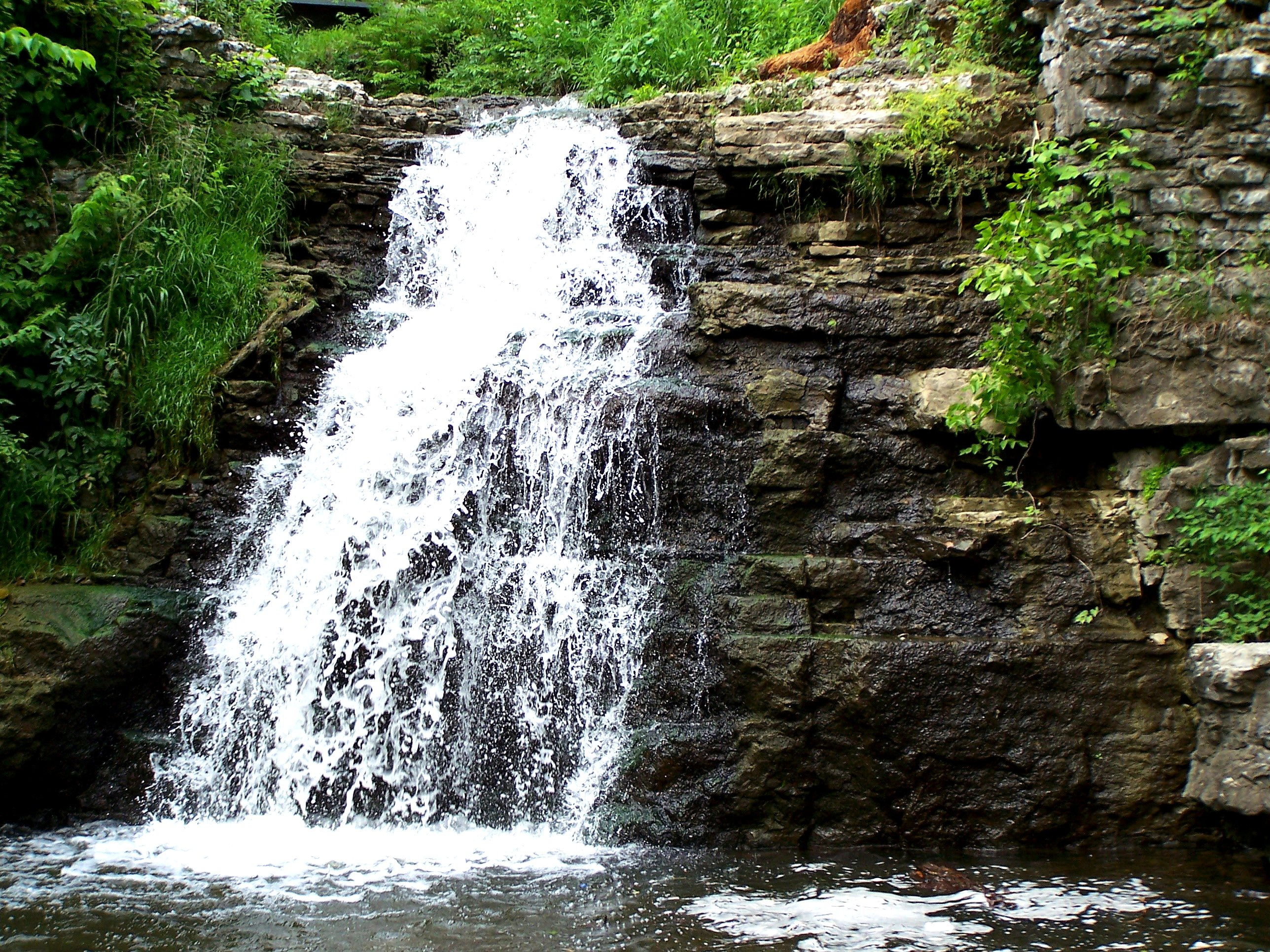
- A waterfall in France Park
- Interactive map of France Park
- Nearest city: Logansport, Indiana
- Coordinates: 40°45′21″N 86°27′37″W
- Area: 550 acres (220 ha)
- Operator: Cass County

France Park is a municipal park in Logansport, Indiana. It is operated by Cass County, and offers camping, hiking, swimming, disc golf, and fishing.

The abandoned quarry on the property is a common destination for SCUBA divers and offers many submerged structures to explore, such as a school bus, a plane, and several boats.
