= Goshen Pass =

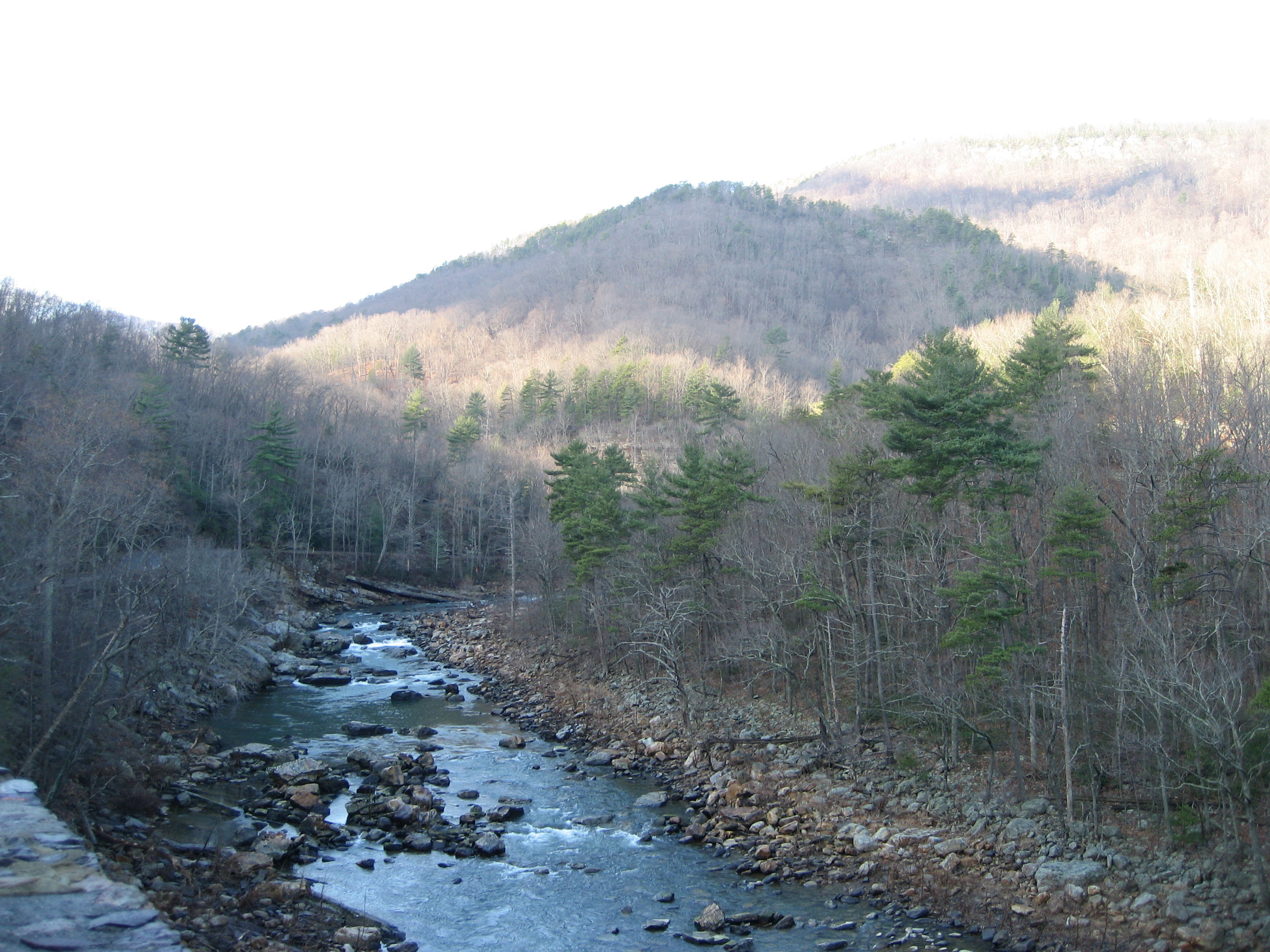
- Maury River at Goshen Pass
- Interactive map of Goshen Pass
- Elevation: 1,350 ft (410 m)
- Traversed by: SR 39

Third Approach
- Location: Rockbridge County, Virginia, United States
- Range: Ridge and Valley Appalachians
- Coordinates: 37°55′49″N 79°27′19″W

Goshen Pass is a water gap, or gorge, in the Little North Mountain, formed by the passage of the Maury River, approximately 20 miles (32 km) northwest of Lexington in Rockbridge County, Virginia. State Route 39 traverses the pass along the banks of the Maury River.

== Background ==
Goshen Pass is the site of the Matthew Fontaine Maury memorial overlooking the Maury River. After Maury's death, his body was taken from the Virginia Military Institute in Lexington to Hollywood Cemetery in Richmond. Along the way the coach stopped at the Goshen Pass, per Maury's request, to pick some of his favorite flowers, rhododendrons, and mountain-ivy before continuing onward to Richmond. Subsequently, a memorial to him was placed there, consisting of a vertical stone monument, showing Maury's face and an inscription a poem written by Mrs. Margaret Junkin Preston as cited on the webpage. In addition, high above the river below, a huge anchor and chain were placed, honoring Maury's naval service.

Matthew Fontaine Maury is buried between Virginian presidents John Tyler and James Monroe.

== Gallery ==
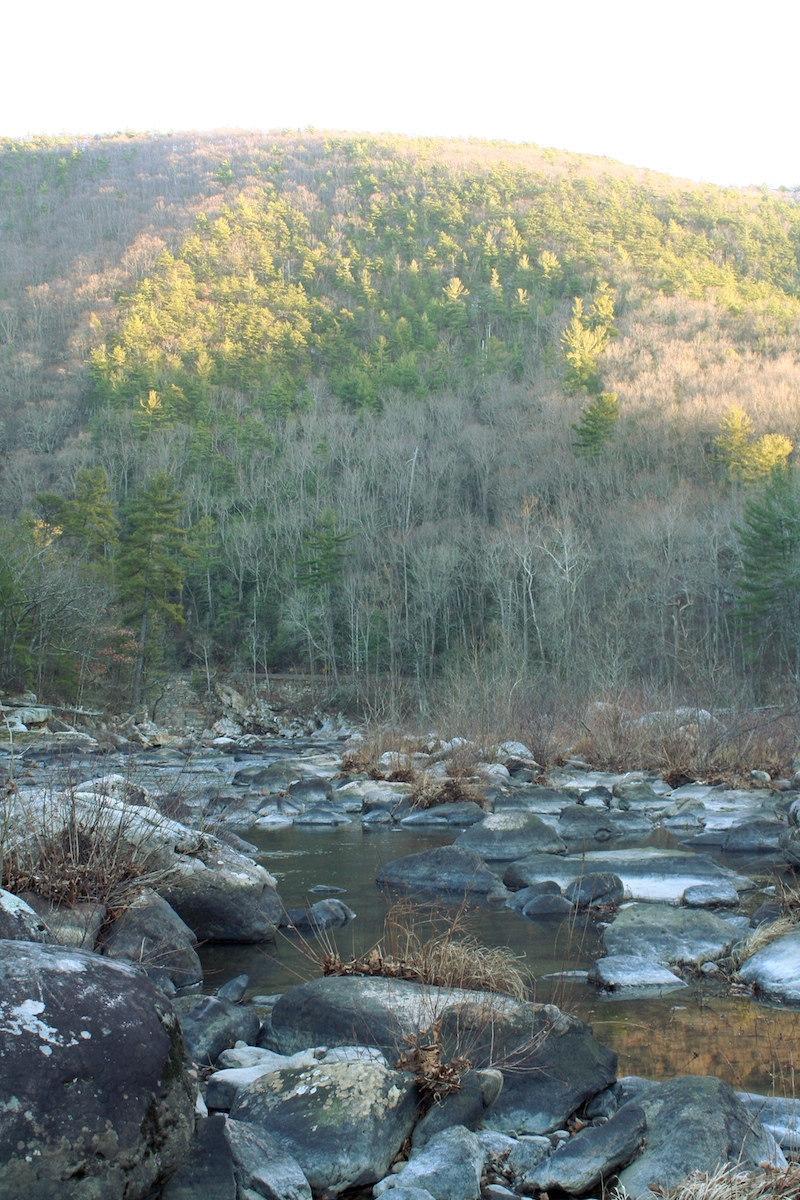
The Maury River cuts through the Appalachians, west of Wilson Springs, between Hogback Mountain and Jump Mountain

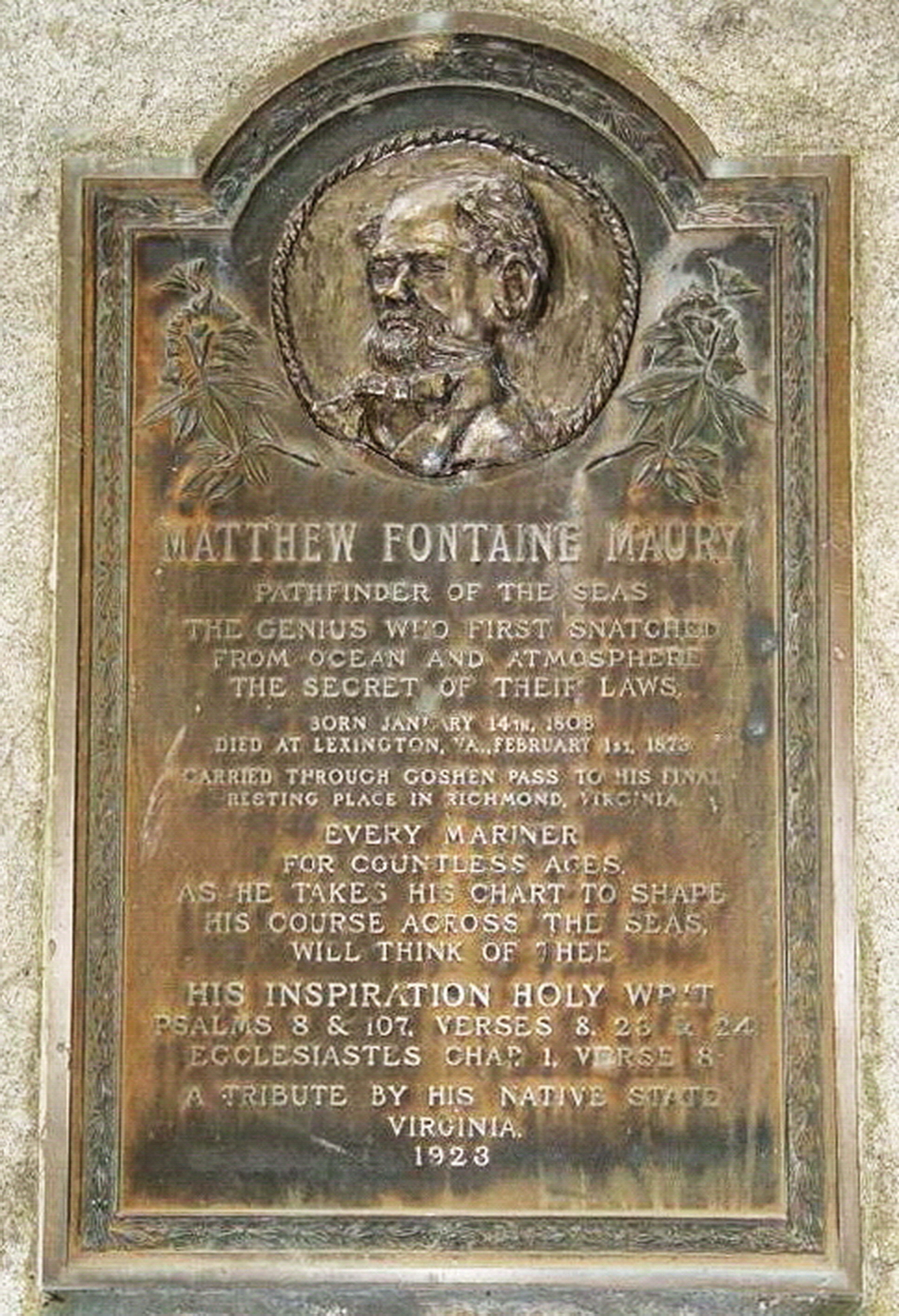
Maury Memorial at Goshen Pass overlooking the Maury River

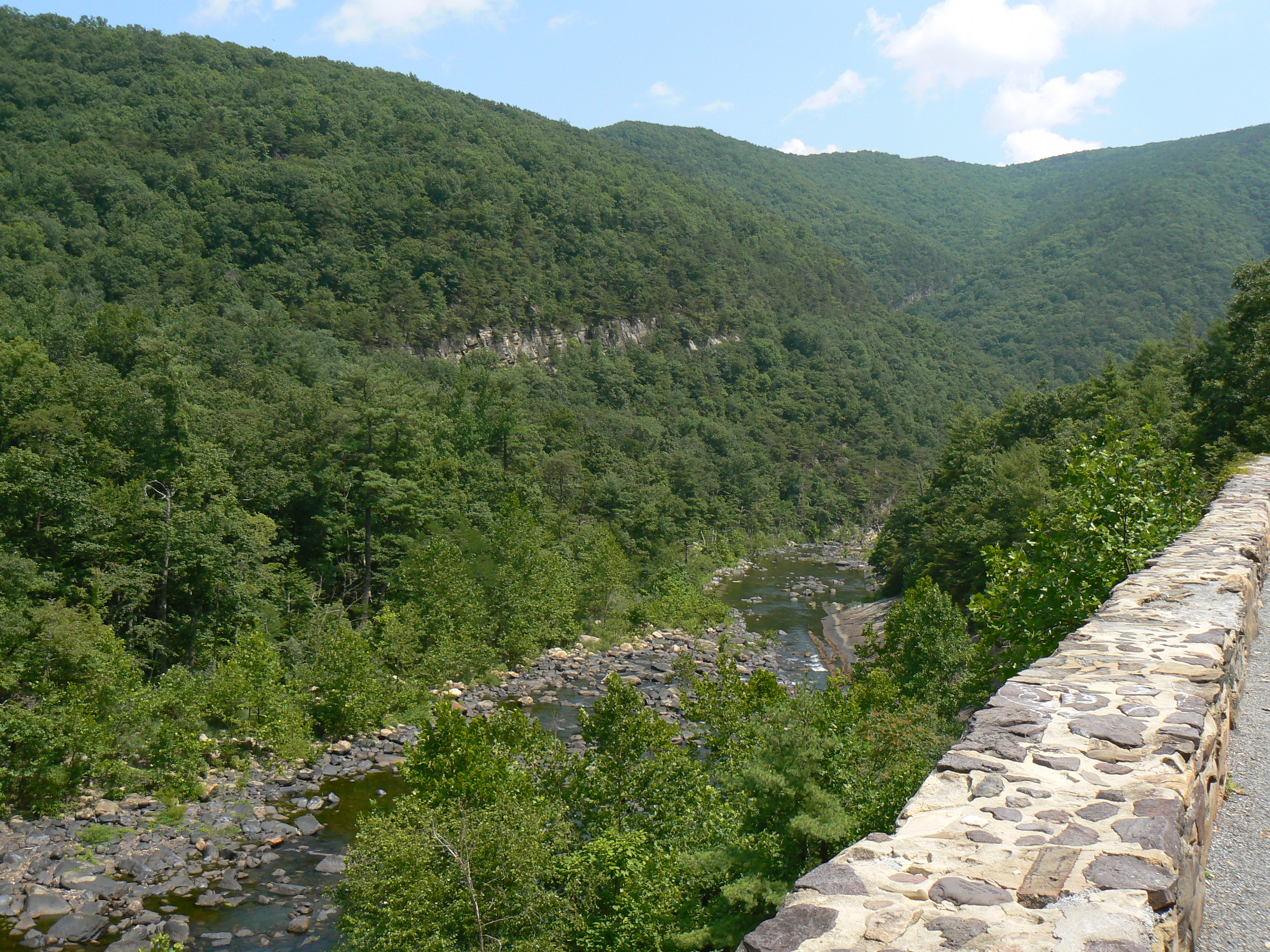
View to northeast from overlook

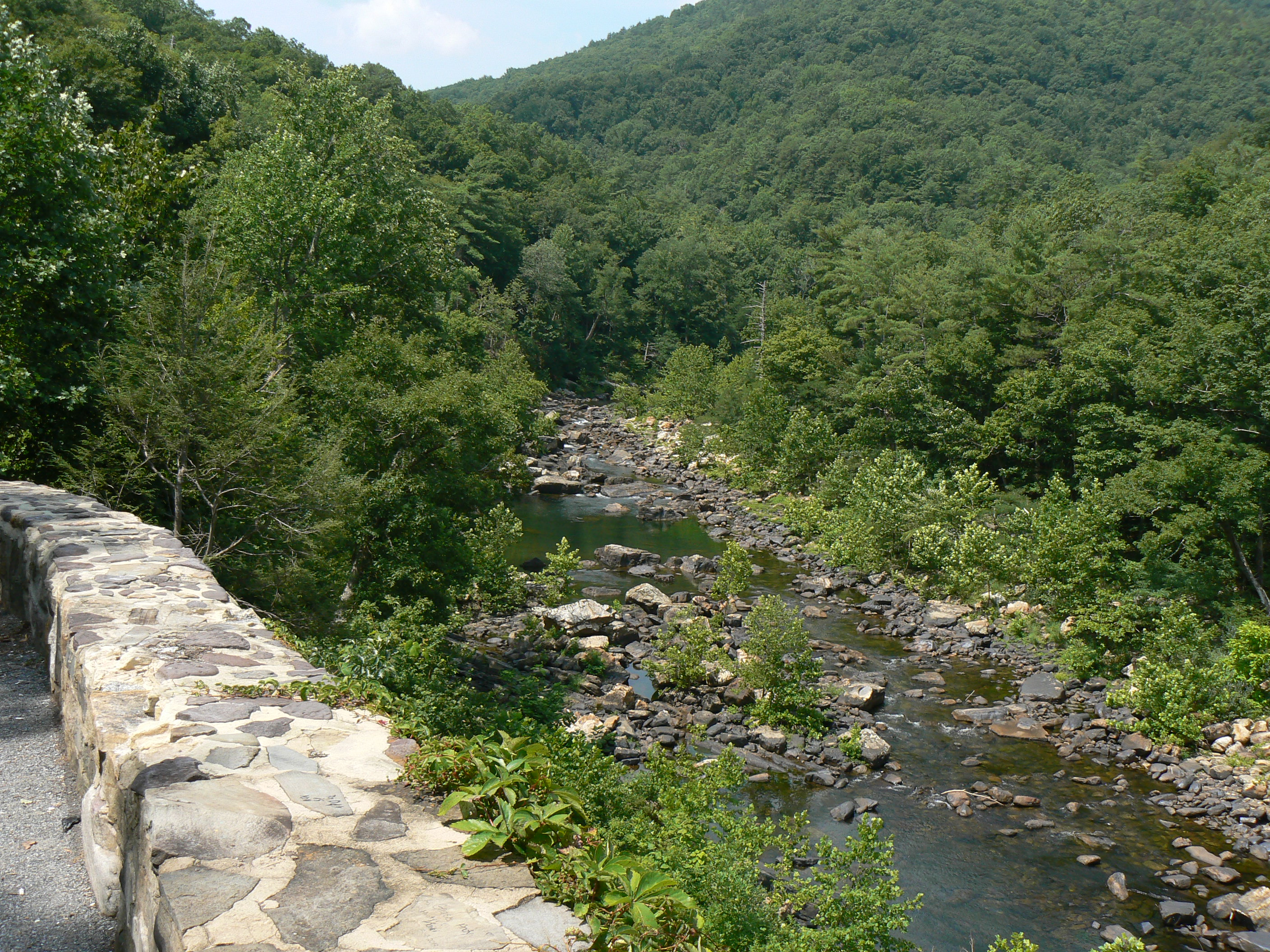
View to southwest from overlook

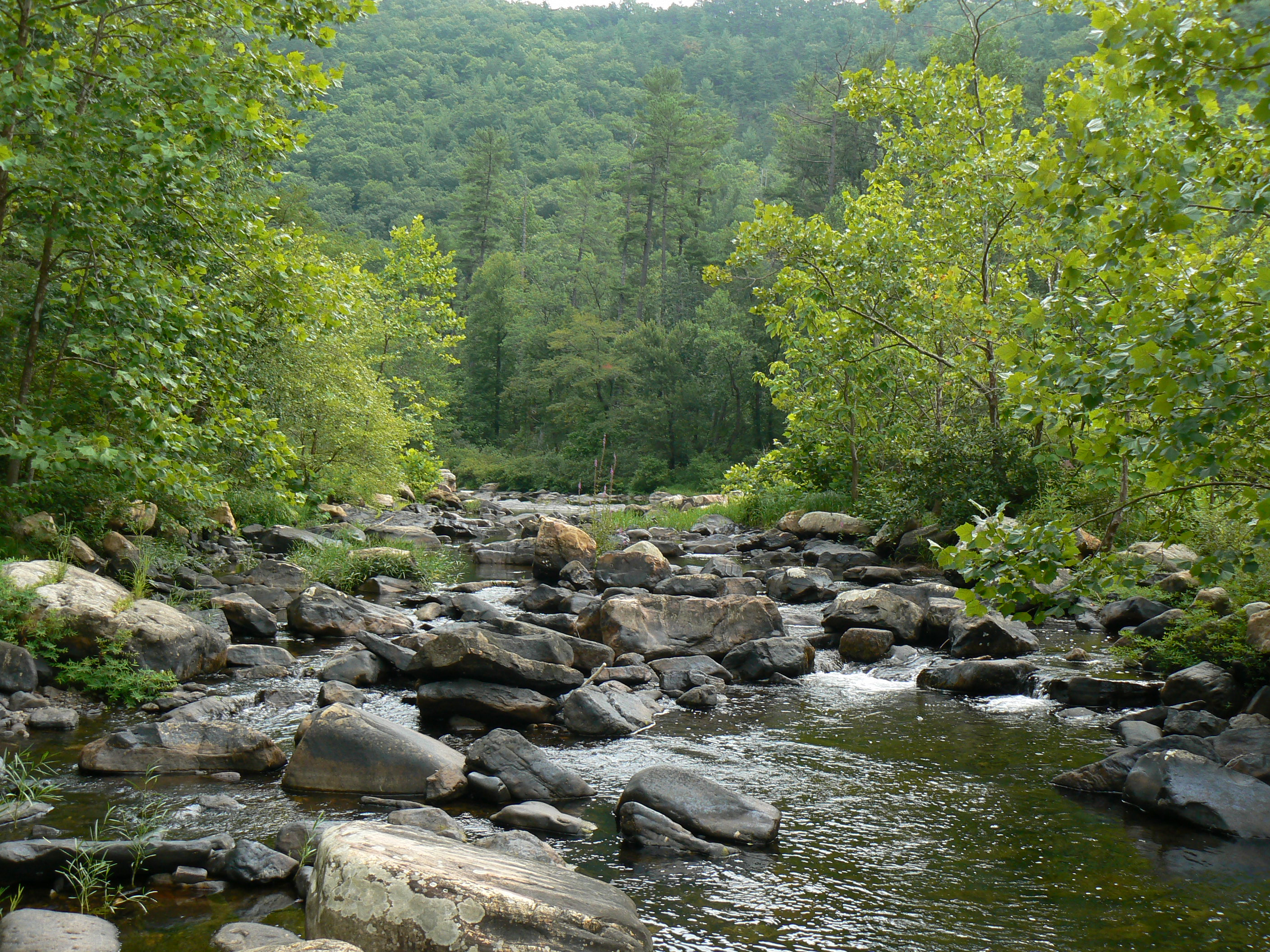
Maury River

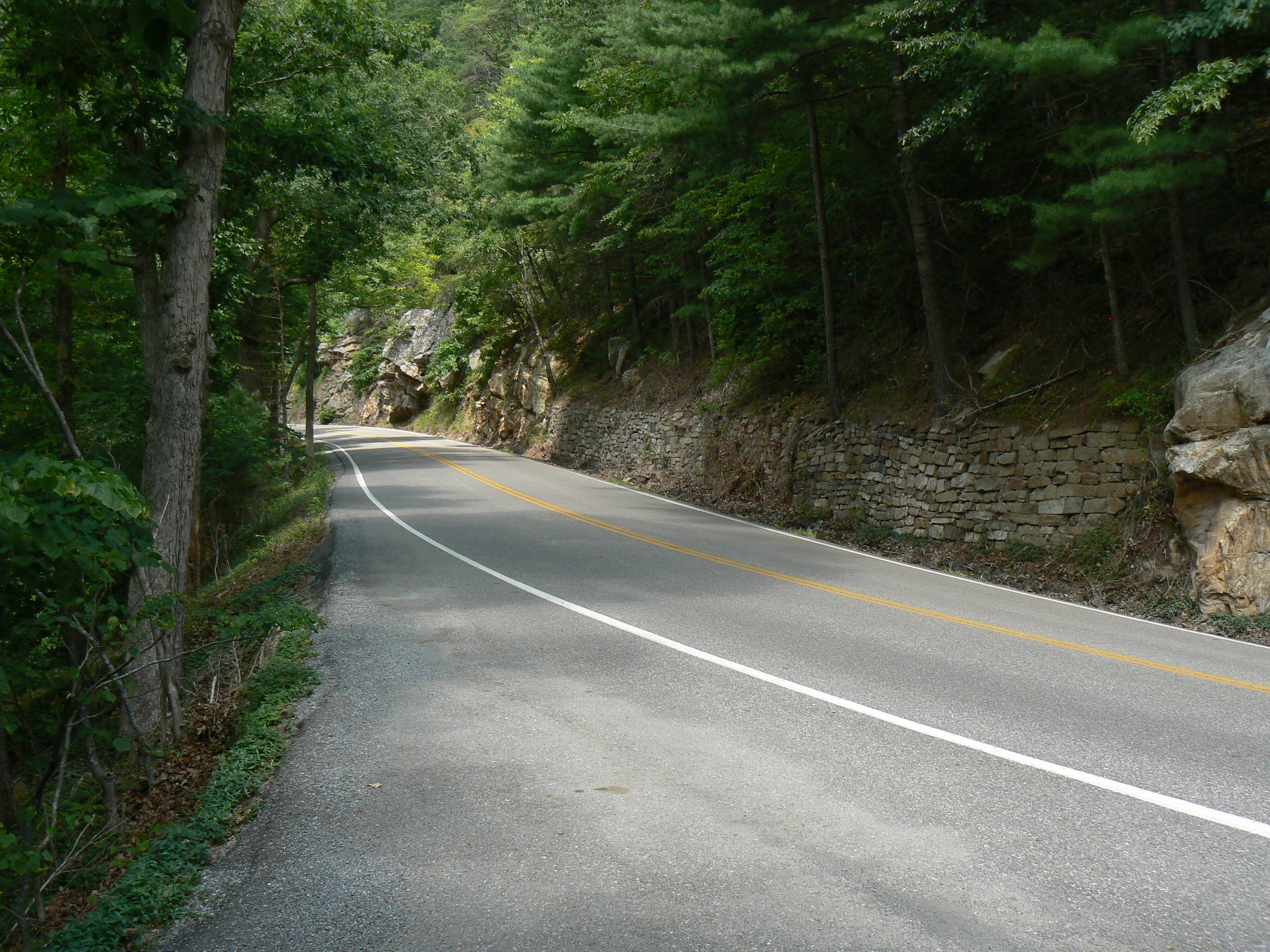
State Route 39 near west end of the pass

== See also ==
- Goshen Pass Natural Area Preserve
- Goshen Scout Reservation
