= Chessie Nature Trail =

Rail trail in Virginia

Coordinates: 37.783937°N 79.451003°W

The Chessie Nature Trail is a rail trail linking Buena Vista, Virginia with Lexington, Virginia along the Maury River. The six-mile (9.7 km) trail follows the roadbed of a former Chesapeake and Ohio Railway (C&O) branch line which extended from Glasgow, Virginia, to Lexington, primarily following the Maury River.

== History ==
During the 1800s, the Maury River was developed with a series of locks and dams which permitted packet boats to transport goods such as agricultural and iron products and passengers from Lexington to the James River at Glasgow and on to Richmond, Virginia if desired.

Like many of America's canals, the canal was soon replaced by the railroad, in this case a branch line through Buena Vista to Lexington from the C&O mainline through Glasgow. In 1969, a devastating flood in western Virginia from the remnants of Hurricane Camille destroyed much of this rail line. The C&O and competitor Norfolk and Western Railway (N&W) agreed to jointly rebuild only the N&W line which also paralleled the river between Buena Vista and Glasgow, with C&O being granted trackage rights from Glasgow to Loch Laird, a location on the west side Buena Vista. These trackage rights allowed the C&O to continue to serve several industries in Buena Vista. The C&O tracks beyond the Georgia Bonded Fibers plant near the US 60 crossing of the Maury River were abandoned. This right-of-way was later donated to the Virginia Military Institute Foundation for the purpose of creating a public walking trail; ownership of the trail was expected to be transferred from the VMI Foundation to VMI in late 2009. In 2013, the Friends of the Chessie Trail organization group formed as a communication hub for interested organizations and individuals.

== Trail description ==
The trail is a path at water level across fields, pastures, and woods along the Maury River. Historic canal and railroad structures are easily accessible. Initially, bikes were prohibited from the trail, but in 2011 "no bikes allowed" signs were removed. Horses are still prohibited except for special events. The trail can be reached in Lexington from US 11 to Route 631, east on Old Buena Vista Road one-half mile (0.8 km) to the parking lot. From Buena Vista, travel on US 60 west to Rt. 608 at the east end of the Russell Robey Bridge over the Maury River; parking is available near the gate.
