= Newton Blackmour State Trail =

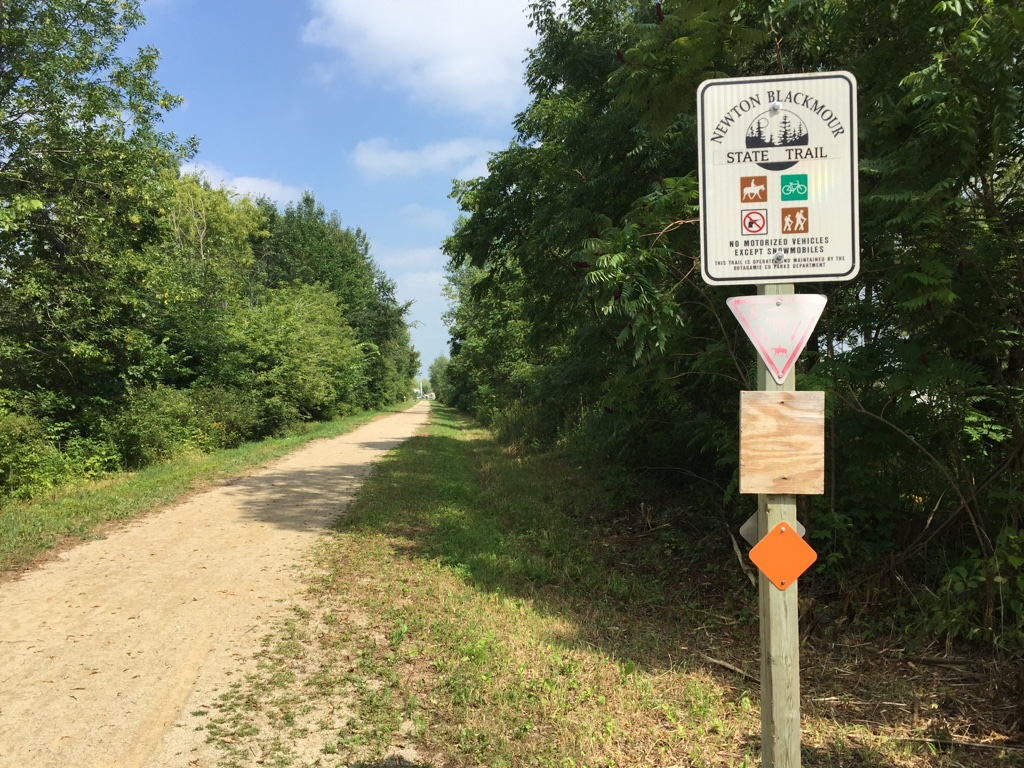
At Park Lane in Seymour

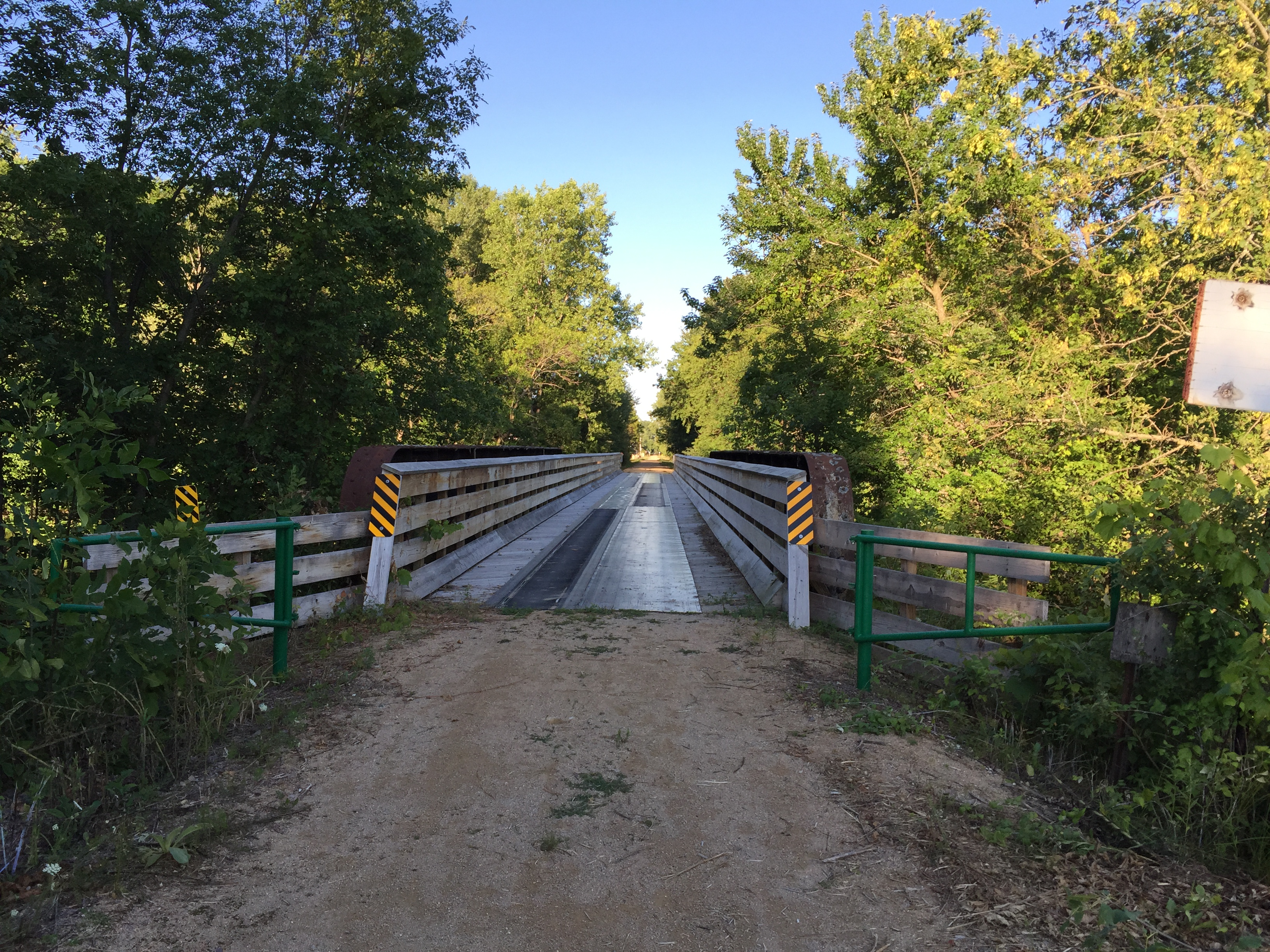
Bridge over Wolf River in Shiocton

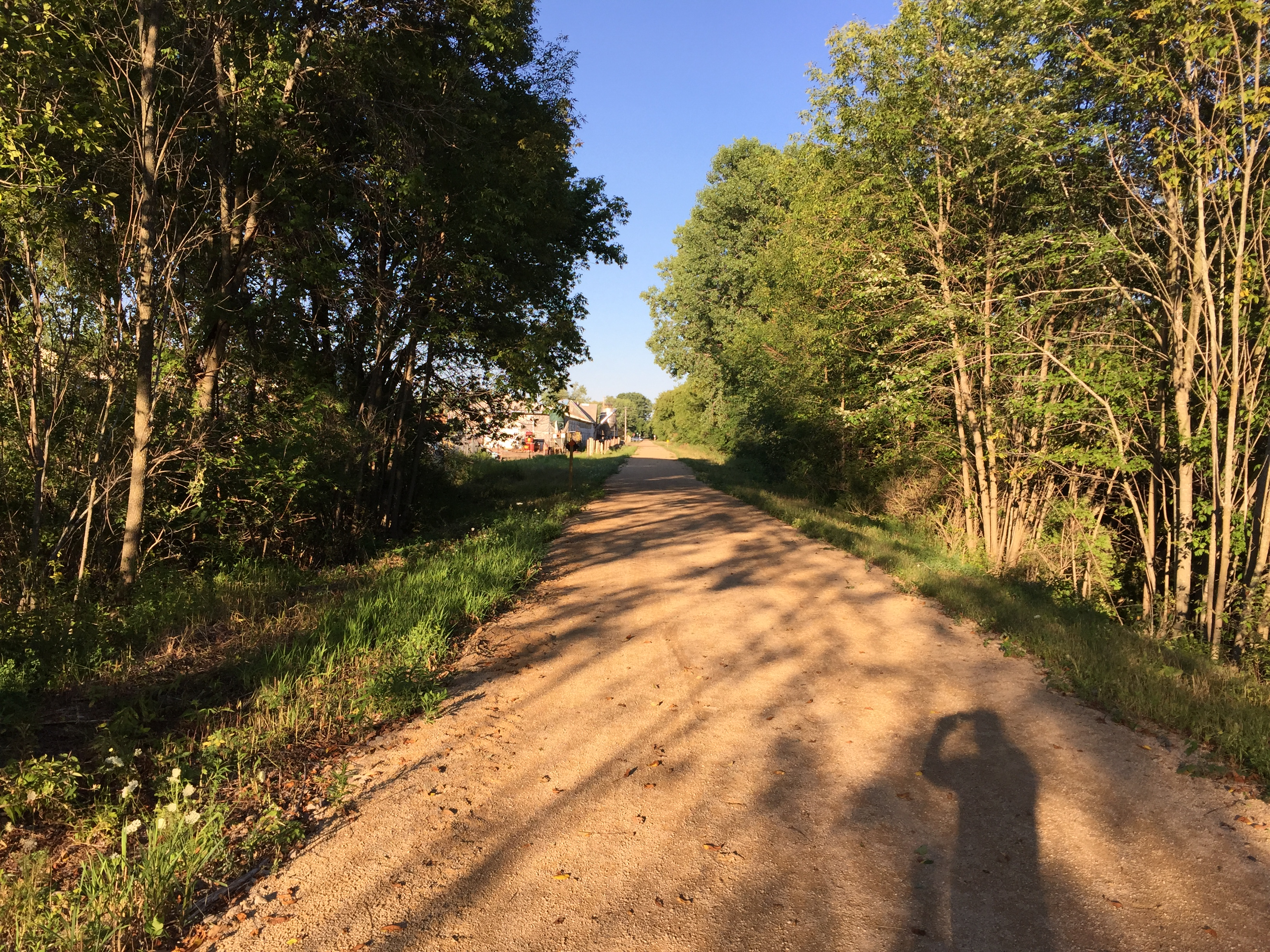
Trail going through Shiocton

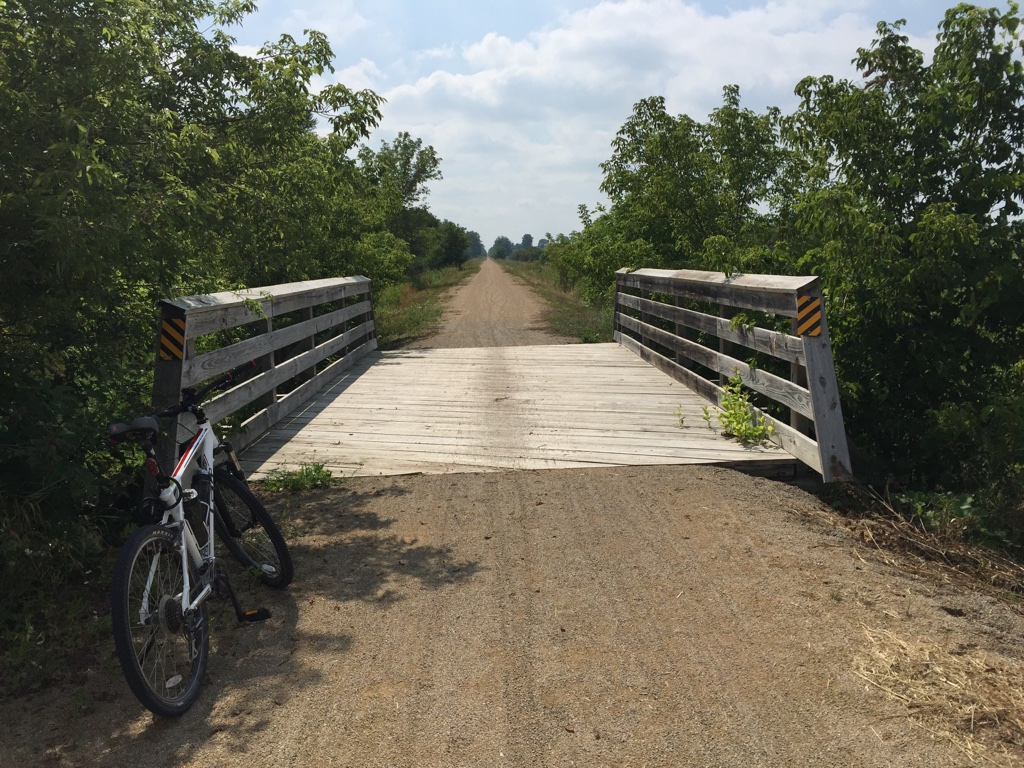
Small bridge between Black Creek and Seymour

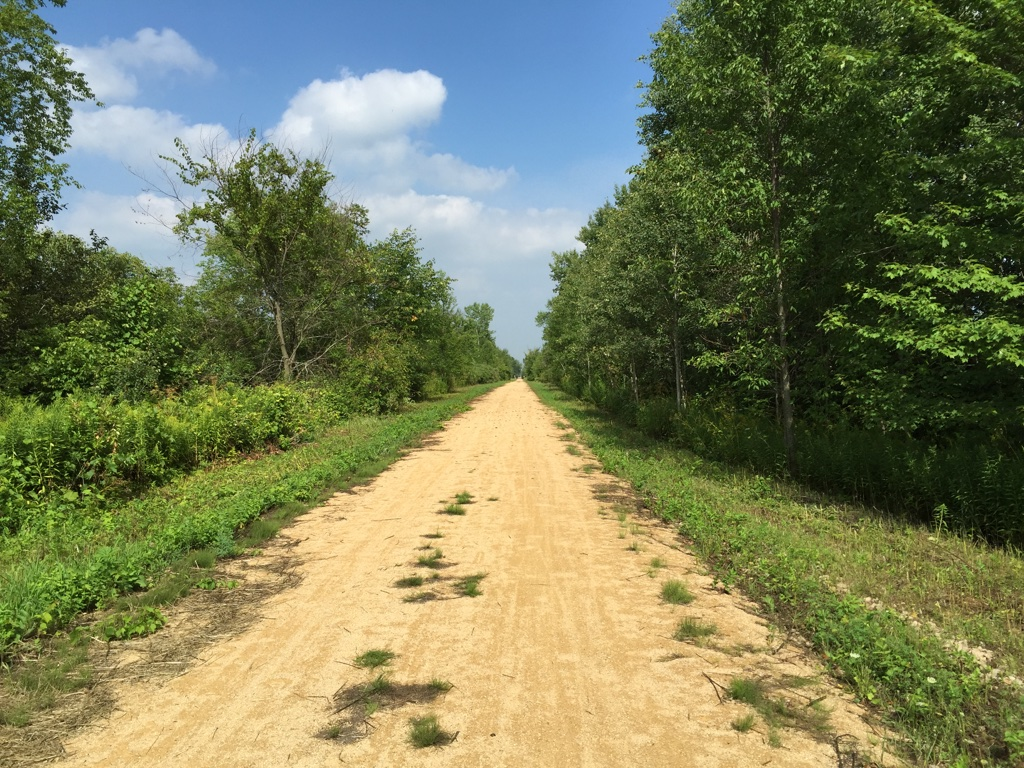
Looking east towards Black Creek

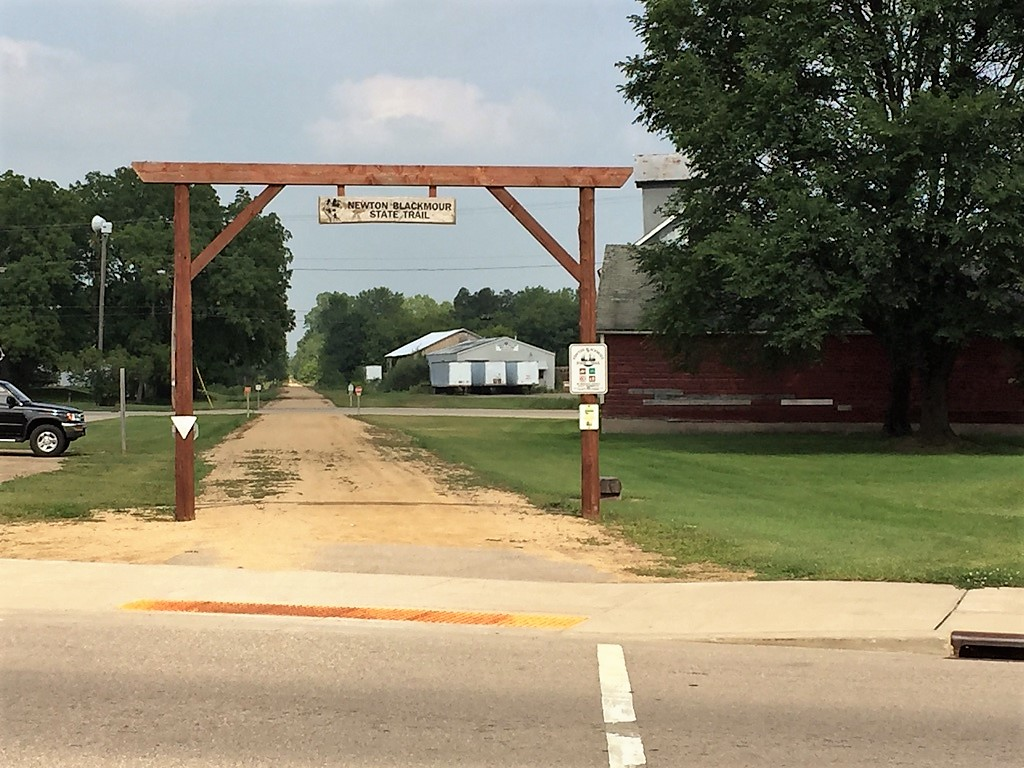
Arch entry on Main St (Hwy 47) in Black Creek

The Newton Blackmour State Trail is a crushed limestone trail in northern Outagamie County in Wisconsin, United States. The trail spans 24 miles (39 km) on a former rail corridor. Its name is derived from the four communities the trail passes through: New London, Shiocton, Black Creek and Seymour. The trail's eastern end in Seymour connects to the Duck Creek Trail, which travels east through the Oneida Nation of Wisconsin and ends in the Village of Oneida.

With the connection to the Duck Creek Trail, the combined trails are over 30 miles (48 km) long. The combined trails extend from the Village of Oneida to New London.

== History ==
The right of way that the trail occupies was originally chartered by the Green Bay & Lake Pepin Railway in 1866, aiming to link Green Bay with the Mississippi River. Rails were finally laid in 1871 after the company was able to secure financing for construction. In 1873, the company changed its name to the Green Bay & Mississippi Railway and stretched from Kewaunee on Lake Michigan, to Winona, Minnesota. However, the company struggled financially and declared bankruptcy twice- first in 1881, and again in 1896. The company emerged from the second bankruptcy as the Green Bay & Western Railroad which owned and operated the line until 1993 when Wisconsin Central Railroad bought the line. They were in turn purchased by Canadian National in 2001. The rails were torn up in 2008 and turned into the Newton Blackmour State Trail.

== Access ==
The trail is open to bicyclists, walkers, joggers, horseback riders, and pets on leashes. In the winter the trail is open to cross-country skiing, snowshoeing, and snowmobiling.

== Amenities ==
In the west end of the trail in New London there are hotels, campgrounds, and bike shops. Twenty minutes east of the trail in Ashwaubenon, there are also hotels and bike shops. In each of the communities the trail goes through, there are various restaurants, grocery stores, and gas stations very close to the path.

== Trailheads ==
On the west end, the trail begins at House Road in New London (44°24′17″N 88°43′05″W). Eventually the trail will continue to Pfeifer Park near downtown New London. In the east, the trail doesn't seem to end at all, as it becomes the Duck Creek Trail east of Vandenhueval Road in Seymour (44°30′35″N 88°18′37″W). However, if a hiker begins in Seymour, the downtown area at Nagel Park makes a good trail head. Nagel Park is located at Main and Depot Streets in downtown Seymour. The trail runs right through the park. The park has a community museum, a train museum located in an old depot, and an old general store. There is plenty of public parking. Nearby are a grocery store, gas station, and several restaurants.

== See also ==
- List of bike trails in Wisconsin
- List of hiking trails in Wisconsin
- List of rail trails
- Rails-to-Trails Conservancy
