= Watershed Trail =

The Watershed Trail is a 1.3-mile-long (2.1 km) rail trail in Edwardsville, Illinois, that follows an old section of Illinois Terminal Railroad tracks.

The eastern end of the trail is near downtown Edwardsville at West High Street just west of North 2nd Street. For much of its length, Watershed Trail follows along the south border of the Watershed Nature Center, a 40-acre (16 ha) protected wetland habitat in Edwardsville. The western end of the trail is at the junction with the Madison County Transit Goshen Trail. This intersection is near the Cahokia Creek Bridge, a Warren deck truss structure that sits at least 40 feet (12 m) above Cahokia Creek.

Watershed Trail is owned and maintained by Madison County Transit.
