= Duck Creek Trail =

Trail in Wisconsin, United States

Map

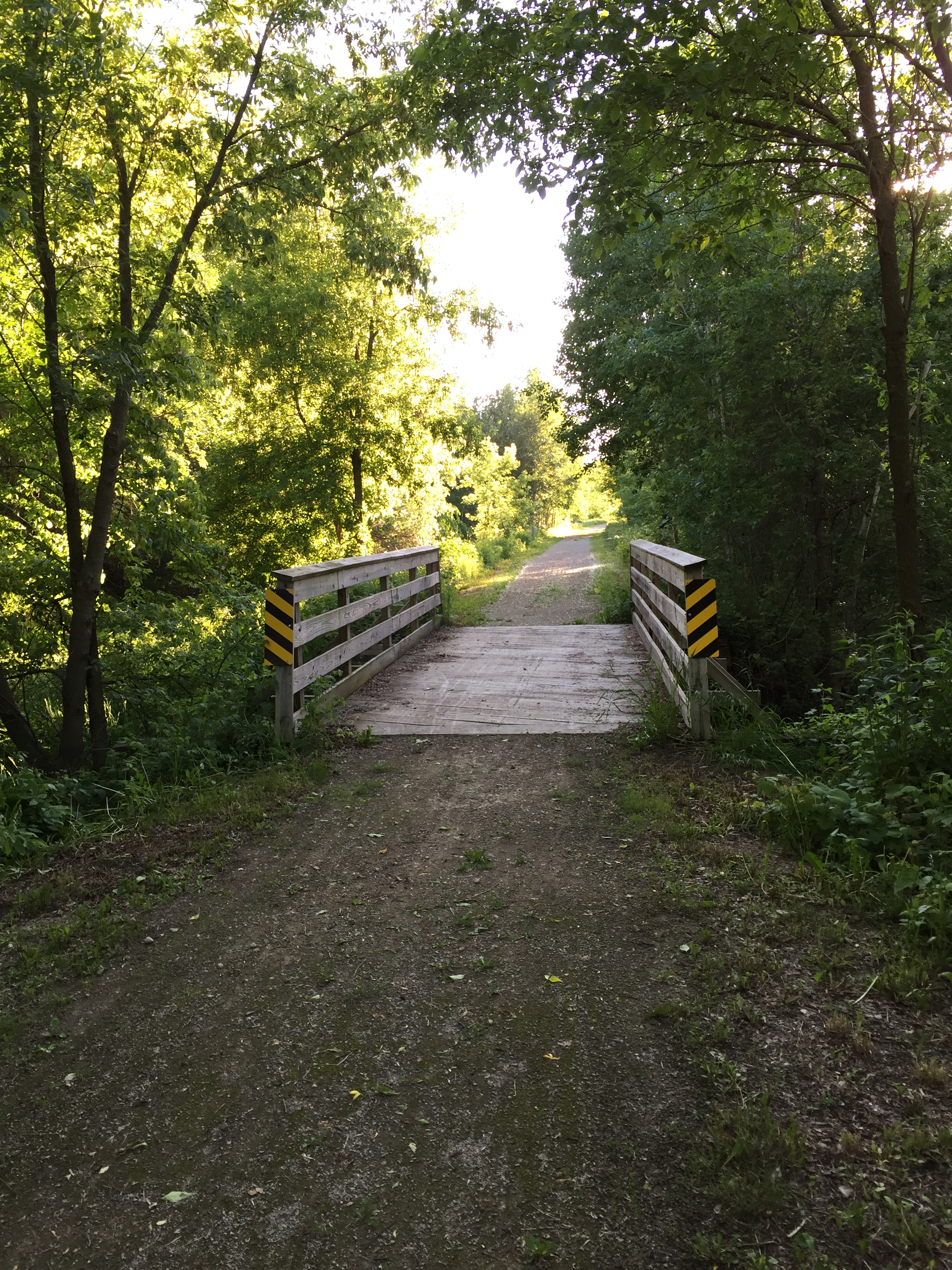
Duck Creek Trail between Seymour and Oneida.

The Duck Creek Trail is a crushed limestone trail in Outagamie and Brown Counties in northeast Wisconsin. The Duck Creek Trail spans seven miles (11 km), beginning at the eastern end of the Newton Blackmour State Trail, just east of Vanderheuvel Road in Seymour (44°30′35″N 88°18′36″W). The trail continues east through the Oneida Nation of Wisconsin in northern Outagamie County paralleling State Route 54, and continues to the Village of Oneida (44°30′27″N 88°11′03″W). The Duck Creek Trail will eventually extend to Pamperin Park in Green Bay.

With the connection to the Newton Blackmour State Trail, the combined trails are over 30 miles (48 km) long. The combined trails extend from Village of Oneida to New London.

== Access ==
The trail is open to bicyclists, walkers, joggers, horseback riders, and pets on leashes. In the winter the trail is open to cross-country skiing, and snowshoeing.

== Amenities ==
Ten minutes east of the trail in Ashwaubenon, there are hotels and bike shops. In the village of Oneida there is a convenience store/gas station. Continuing west, the trail connects with the Newton Blackmour State Trail. Continuing on that trail to downtown Seymour, there are various restaurants, a grocery store, and a gas station very close to the trail.

== See also ==
- List of bike trails in Wisconsin
- List of hiking trails in Wisconsin
- List of rail trails
- Rails-to-Trails Conservancy
