= Calfpasture River =

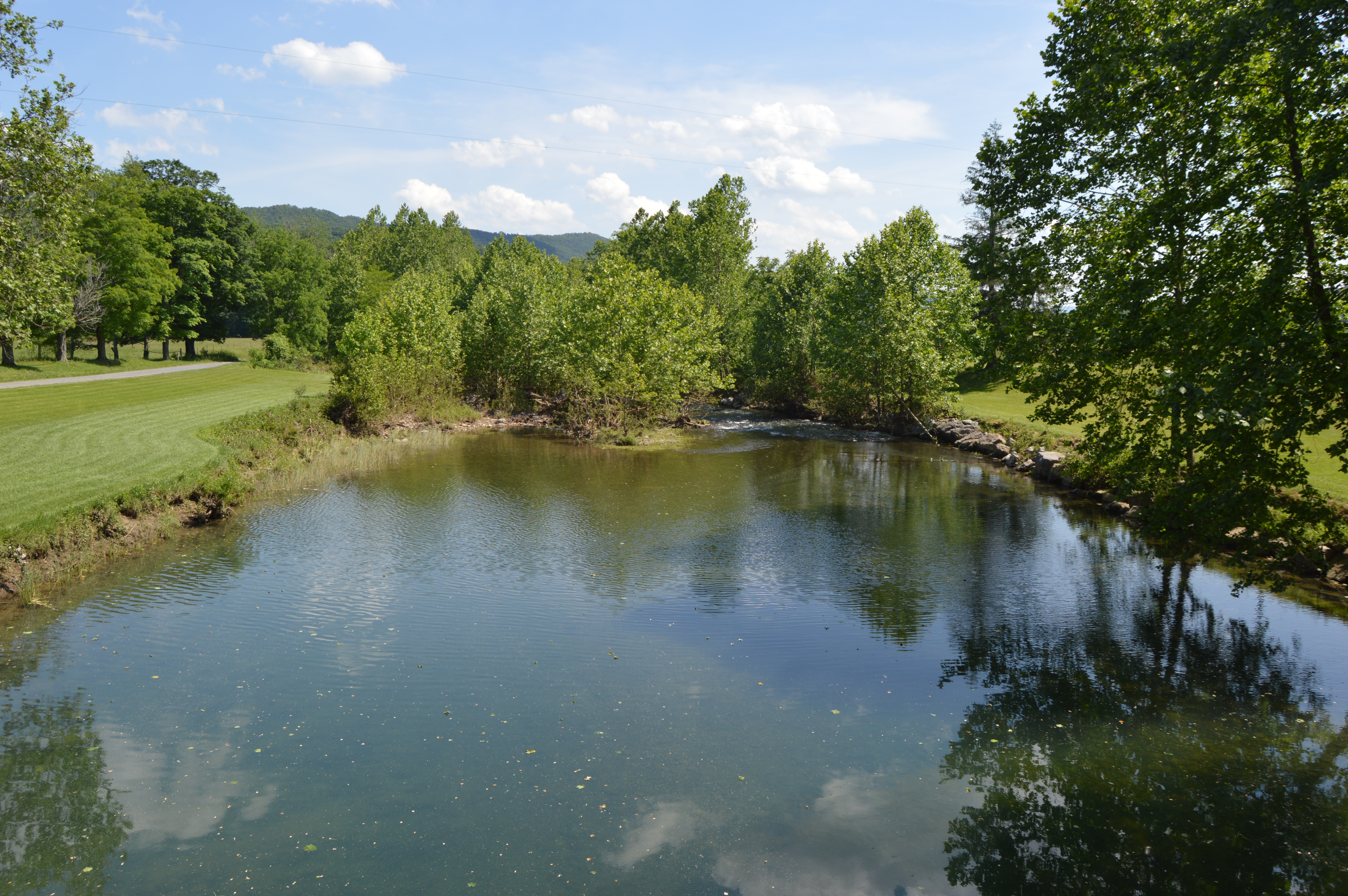
- Midway between Deerfield and Goshen

- Location of the mouth of the Calfpasture River in Virginia

Location
- Country: United States
- State: Virginia
- County: Rockbridge County, Augusta County

Physical characteristics
- Source: Gordons Peak
  - location: Allegheny Mountains, Augusta County, Virginia
  - coordinates: 38°20′32″N 79°18′15″W
  - elevation: 3,460 ft (1,050 m)
- Mouth: Maury River
  - location: Near Goshen, Rockbridge County, Virginia
  - coordinates: 37°56′57″N 79°27′34″W
  - elevation: 1,345 ft (410 m)
- Length: 41 mi (66 km)
- Basin size: 144 sq mi (370 km^{2})
- Discharge
  - location: Goshen
  - average: 169 cu ft/s (4.8 m^{3}/s)
  - minimum: 0 cu ft/s (0 m^{3}/s)
  - maximum: 21,900 cu ft/s (620 m^{3}/s)

Basin features
- Tributaries
  - left: Little Calfpasture River
  - right: Hamilton Branch, Brattons Run

The Calfpasture River is a river in the U.S. state of Virginia. It flows about 41.0 miles (66.0 km) from its source, Gordons Peak in the Allegheny Mountains, to its confluence with the Little Calfpasture River, forming the Maury River. Via the Maury, the Calfpasture's waters flow into the James River, thence Chesapeake Bay and the Atlantic Ocean.

According to the U.S. Board on Geographic Names, variant names of the Calfpasture River include the Big Calfpasture River, Calf Pasture River, Great Calfpasture River, and North River.

== Course ==
The Calfpasture River originates on the slopes of Gordons Peak, in Augusta County, near Shenandoah Mountain, in George Washington National Forest. Its headwater tributaries drain Bald Ridge. The river flows generally southwest for most of its course.

The tributary Braley Branch joins just before the Calfpasture River flows by the small settlement of West Augusta. U.S. Route 250 crosses the river at West Augusta. Continuing southwest, the river is joined by West Dry Branch from the east, then it enters Deerfield Valley, where the tributaries Tizzle Branch and Still Run join. Deerfield Valley is flanked by Shenandoah Mountain to the west and Great North Mountain to the east. The Calfpasture River flows by the small town of Little Baltimore, after which one of its main tributaries, Hamilton Branch, joins. The Calfpasture River then flows out of Deerfield Valley and through Fridley Cove, where Fridley Branch joins.

Below Fridley Cove, the Calfpasture River continues flowing southwest, through the valley between Walker Mountain to the west and Great North Mountain to the east. The river passes the small town of Marble Valley, then Clayton Mill Creek joins, after which the river leaves Augusta County and enters Rockbridge County.

Near the town of Goshen the Calfpasture River is joined by Mill Creek from the west and Goshen Branch from the east. State Route 42 crosses the river at Goshen, and State Route 39 follows the river from Goshen downstream to the Maury River.

Just south of Goshen the tributary Brattons Run joins the Calfpasture River, which then turns eastward, passing through a gap between Bratton Mountain and Knob Mountain. The Calfpasture River then joins the Little Calfpasture River. The confluence of the two marks the beginning of the Maury River.

== See also ==
- List of rivers in Virginia
