= Goshen, Virginia =

- Town
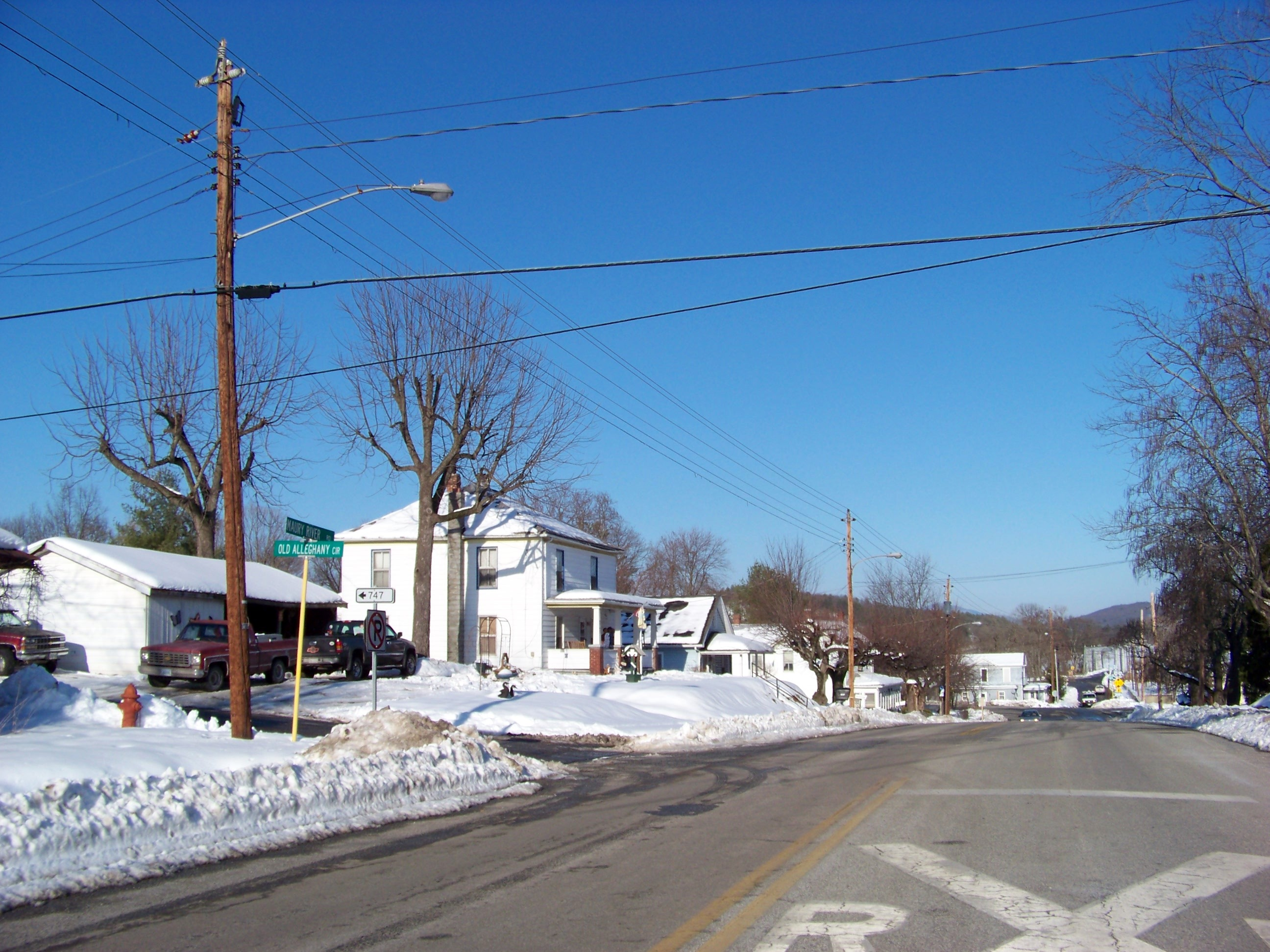
- Houses in Goshen in winter

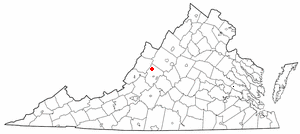
- Location of Goshen, Virginia
- Coordinates: 37°59′21″N 79°29′55″W
- Country: United States
- State: Virginia
- County: Rockbridge

Government
  - Type: Mayoral system with a local five member council
  - Mayor: Joey Sampson
  - Vice Mayor: Tom McCraw
  - Council members: Jessica Hinkle; John Hinton; Tom McCraw; Christopher Robertson; Shirley W. Rorer

Area
  - Total: 1.79 sq mi (4.63 km^{2})
  - Land: 1.73 sq mi (4.48 km^{2})
  - Water: 0.058 sq mi (0.15 km^{2})
- Elevation: 1,404 ft (428 m)

Population (2020)
  - Total: 338
  - Estimate (2019): 368
  - Density: 212.9/sq mi (82.22/km^{2})
- Time zone: UTC−5 (Eastern (EST))
  - Summer (DST): UTC−4 (EDT)
- ZIP code: 24439
- Area code: 540
- FIPS code: 51-31968
- GNIS feature ID: 1494961
- Website: Official website

Goshen is a town in Rockbridge County, Virginia, United States. As of the 2020 census, Goshen had a population of 338.

The town is known for hosting Goshen Scout Reservation, one of the largest Boy Scout camps in America.

== History ==
Goshen was once inhabited by Indian tribes such as the Cherokee and Shawnee. In the 18th century, European settler Alexander Dunlop and his wife Anna MacFarlane moved to the Calfpasture. A few of the first settlers include Bratton, Lockridge, Graham, Carter, and Davis. The first Goshen council was headed in 1744 by James Patton and John Lewis.

Goshen was based on farms, much like today, raising mainly corn. While Goshen was mainly farmland, in the 1800s, Goshen Pass and Panther's Gap was a bustling community with a school, a hotel, a post office, and foundries.

The Alleghany Hotel was built by the Goshen Improvement Company, the company which in the boom period of 1890 selected Goshen station as a site for laying of and the founding of a new city. The hotel was known as the "house of entertainment," but a few years before the fire, it was renamed the Alleghany Sanitarium, housing tuberculosis patients. On Thanksgiving Day, 1922, the Alleghany Hotel smoldered in flames and ash for 2 1/2 hours before the building was completely destroyed. During this time, Goshen was without a fire department to combat the flames.

The Goshen Land Company Bridge was listed on the National Register of Historic Places in 1978.

== Geography ==
Goshen is located at 37°59′21″N 79°29′55″W (37.989100, −79.498603).

According to the United States Census Bureau, the town has a total area of 1.7 square miles (4.5 km^{2}), all land.

The Calfpasture River flows through Goshen, just before joining the Little Calfpasture River to form the Maury River.

== Demographics ==
Historical population
| Census | Pop. | Note | %± |
|---|---|---|---|
| 1900 | 253 | | — |
| 1910 | 165 | | −34.8% |
| 1920 | 154 | | −6.7% |
| 1930 | 124 | | −19.5% |
| 1940 | 187 | | 50.8% |
| 1950 | 124 | | −33.7% |
| 1960 | 99 | | −20.2% |
| 1970 | 121 | | 22.2% |
| 1980 | 134 | | 10.7% |
| 1990 | 366 | | 173.1% |
| 2000 | 406 | | 10.9% |
| 2010 | 361 | | −11.1% |
| 2020 | 338 | | −6.4% |
U.S. Decennial Census

As of the census of 2000, there were 406 people, 179 households, and 107 families residing in the town. The population density was 233.5 people per square mile (90.1/km^{2}). There were 214 housing units at an average density of 123.1 per square mile (47.5/km^{2}). The racial makeup of the town was 96.31% White and 3.69% African American.

There were 179 households, out of which 27.4% had children under the age of 18 living with them, 39.7% were married couples living together, 16.2% had a female householder with no husband present, and 39.7% were non-families. 33.0% of all households were made up of individuals, and 13.4% had someone living alone who was 65 years of age or older. The average household size was 2.27 and the average family size was 2.90.

In the town, the population was spread out, with 23.6% under the age of 18, 8.4% from 18 to 24, 27.8% from 25 to 44, 23.4% from 45 to 64, and 16.7% who were 65 years of age or older. The median age was 38 years. For every 100 females, there were 84.5 males. For every 100 females age 18 and over, there were 80.2 males.

The median income for a household in the town was $23,958, and the median income for a family was $30,455. Males had a median income of $25,227 versus $18,250 for females. The per capita income for the town was $14,400. About 17.3% of families and 18.0% of the population were below the poverty line, including 20.2% of those under age 18 and 17.4% of those age 65 or over.

== Publications: print and web ==
- The News-Gazette (weekly newspaper)
- The Rockbridge Advocate (monthly magazine)
- The Rockbridge Report (weekly website and cable TV broadcast by students at Washington and Lee University)
- Rockbridge Weekly (weekly newspaper)

== Climate ==
The climate in this area is characterized by hot, humid summers and generally mild to cool winters. According to the Köppen Climate Classification system, Goshen has a humid subtropical climate, abbreviated "Cfa" on climate maps.
