= Powerline Trail =

Trail in Milwaukee County, Wisconsin

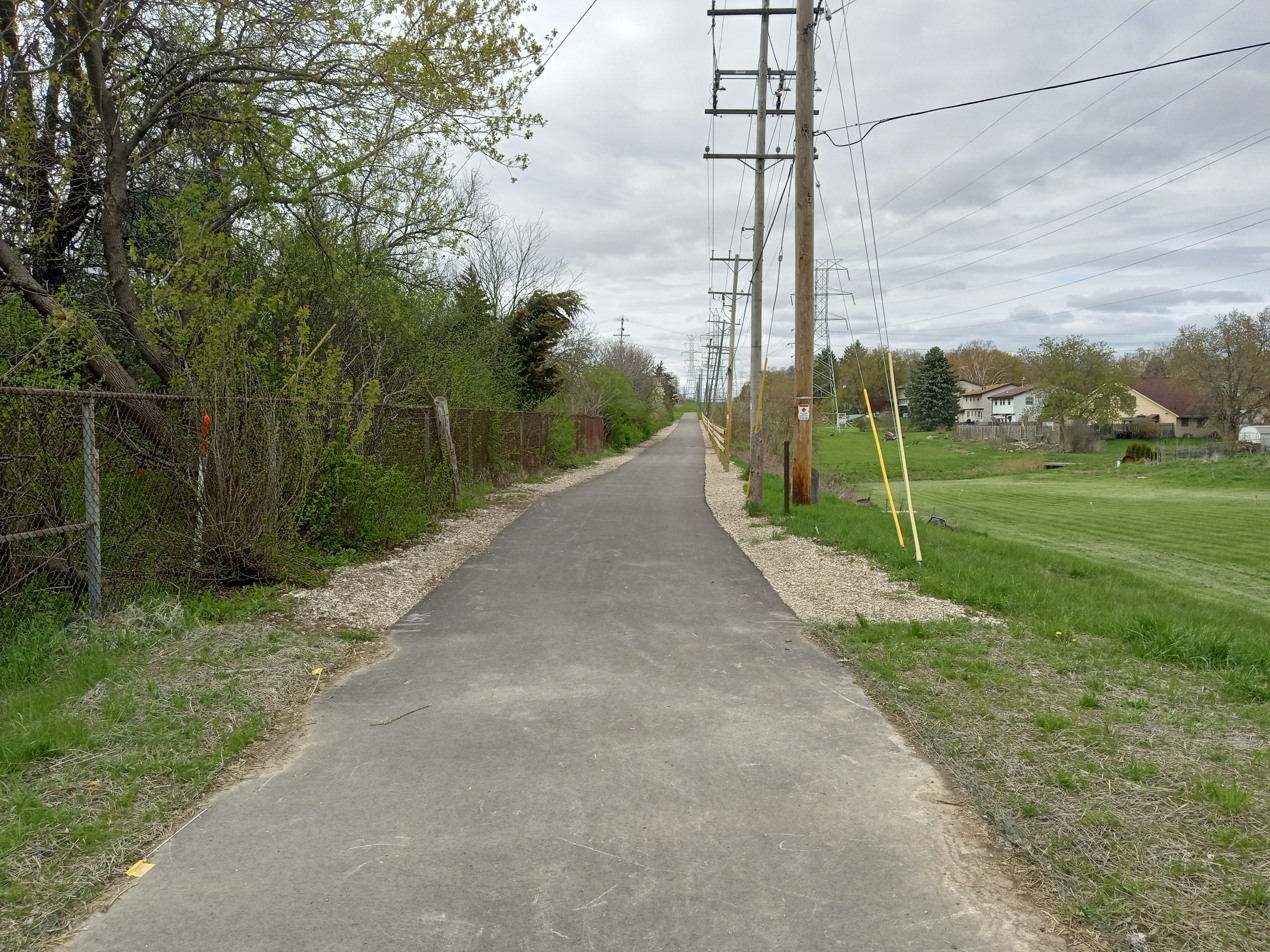
- The Powerline Trail at 100th Street, facing north, with utility poles stretching into the distance
- Length: 3 mi (4.8 km)
- Location: Milwaukee County, Wisconsin
- Established: 2022-10-05
- Use: Shared-use path
- Maintainer: City of Greenfield and City of Milwaukee
- Website: Powerline Trail

The Powerline Trail is a planned 9-mile (14 km) shared-use path in Milwaukee County, Wisconsin, of which a 3-mile (4.8 km) section has been built. The trail follows a We Energies-owned right-of-way.

== History ==
The right-of-way of the Powerline Trail was originally occupied by a railroad used for transporting coal to a St. Francis power plant.

A 2006 study performed by the Wisconsin Bike Fed for the City of Milwaukee recommended the creation of a trail on a We Energies-owned right-of-way between Interstate 894 in Greenfield and Packard Avenue in St. Francis. In 2020, the City of Greenfield received a US$1.2 million grant to design and construct a 3-mile (4.8 km) section of the trail between 105th Street and 60th Street. On October 5, 2022, this initial section was opened.

As of 2022, a second segment between 60th Street and Greenfield's Pondview Park is being planned, and the cities of Milwaukee, St. Francis, and West Allis are pursuing funding for future segments.

== Route ==
The trail begins with a connection to the Oak Leaf Trail's Root River Line near South 104th Street and travels east along the southern side of Cold Spring Road until I-894, where it bends north to meet a We Energies right of way. The trail briefly runs north along the east side of the highway, then travels east along the right-of-way until reaching its eastern terminus at 60th Street. Planned extensions would continue the trail to the lakefront, near St. Francis's Nojoshing Trail, and add spurs near the existing western terminus.

== See also ==
- Hank Aaron State Trail
- New Berlin Trail
