= Fürth (surname) =

Fürth, von Fürth or Furth is a surname. Notable people with this surname include:

- Charlotte Furth (1934–2022), American historian of China
- Ernestine von Fürth (1877–1946), Austrian-Jewish women's activist
- George Furth (1932–2008), American librettist, playwright, and actor
- Hans G. Furth (1920–1999), Austrian-American psychology professor
- Harold Furth (1930–2002), Austrian-American physicist
- Herbert Furth (1899–1995), Austrian-American economist
- Jacob Furth (1840–1914), Austrian–American entrepreneur
- Jaro Fürth (1871–1945), Austrian actor
- Meyer Fürth (fl. 19th century), German writer
- Otto von Fürth (1867–1938), Austrian physician, physiologist and biochemist
- Peter Furth, bike and transit researcher and professor
- Robin Furth, personal research assistant to Stephen King
- Victor Fürth (1893–1984), Czech architect
