= Lakeshore State Park =

State park in Milwaukee County, Wisconsin

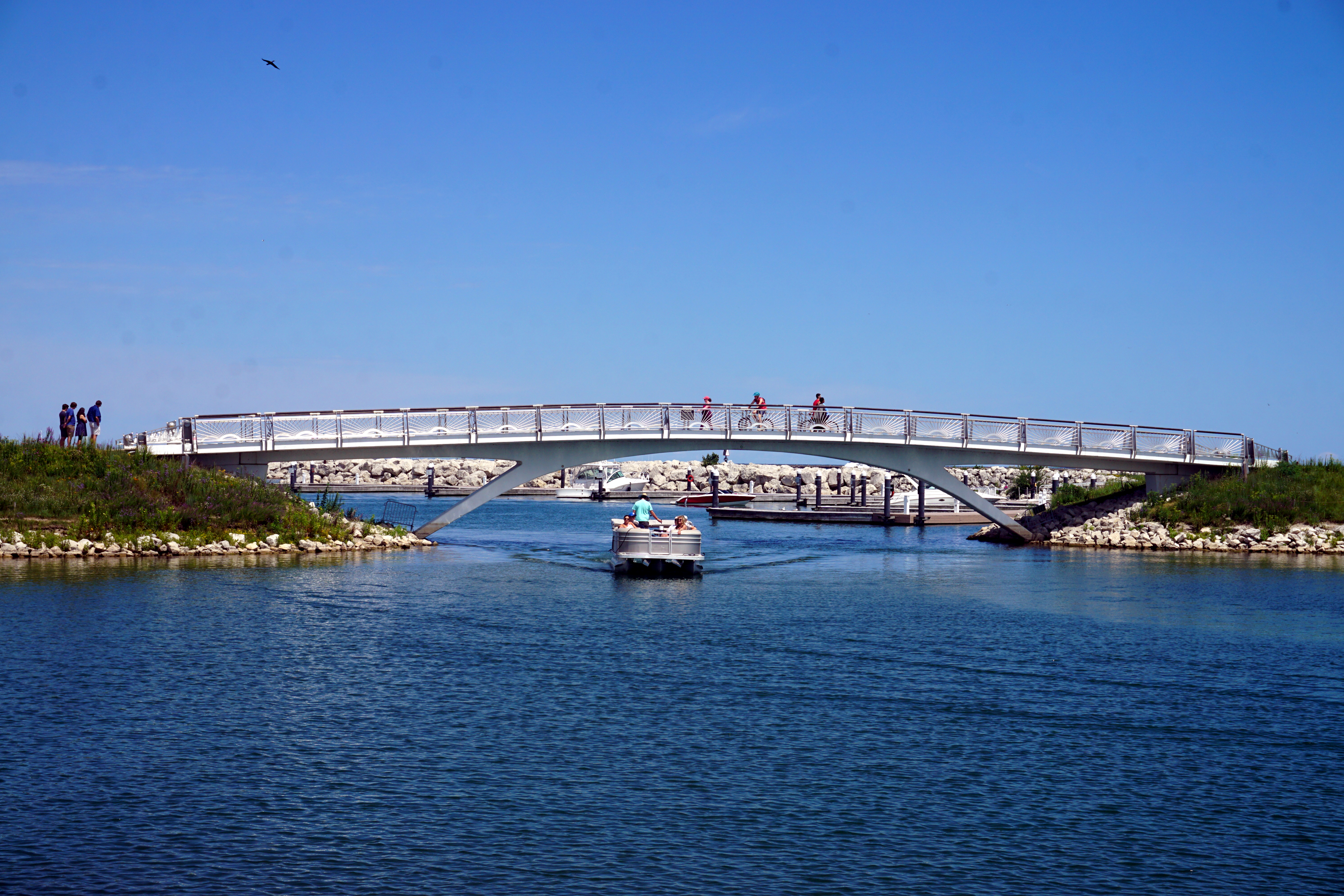

- Location within Wisconsin Location within the United States
- Interactive map of Lakeshore State Park
- Location: Milwaukee, Wisconsin, United States
- Coordinates: 43°1′56″N 87°53′44″W
- Area: 22 acres (8.9 ha)
- Established: 1998
- Administrator: Wisconsin Department of Natural Resources
- Website: Official website
- Wisconsin State Parks

Lakeshore State Park is a 22-acre (8.9 ha) Wisconsin state park located on the shores of Lake Michigan in the city of Milwaukee. It is situated adjacent to both Discovery World and Henry Maier Festival Park.

== Description ==
The park itself is perched atop an artificial bed of limestone rock material removed during the Deep Tunnel Project in the 1980s. It is the only urban state park in Wisconsin and features restored prairie and a pebble beach. In addition to the prairie, portions of the park are planted with Kentucky bluegrass.

The park has a paved trail that connects to both the Hank Aaron State Trail and the Oak Leaf Trail. The park features a fishing pier overlooking a basin, on the side opposite Lake Michigan. There are also boat slips at the north end of the park that can be occupied overnight.

== History ==
Originally known as Harbor Island, the land was built to protect Henry Maier Festival Park from erosion and to shelter boats in the lagoon from storms. It was set aside for "public use and enjoyment" by Milwaukee mayor John Norquist in October 1991. In 1998, the Wisconsin Department of Natural Resources made the island into a state park and set aside space for prairie restoration.

== See also ==
- Parks of Milwaukee
- Henry Maier Festival Park, located directly west across a lagoon
