= Kinnickinnic River Trail =

Trail in Milwaukee County, Wisconsin

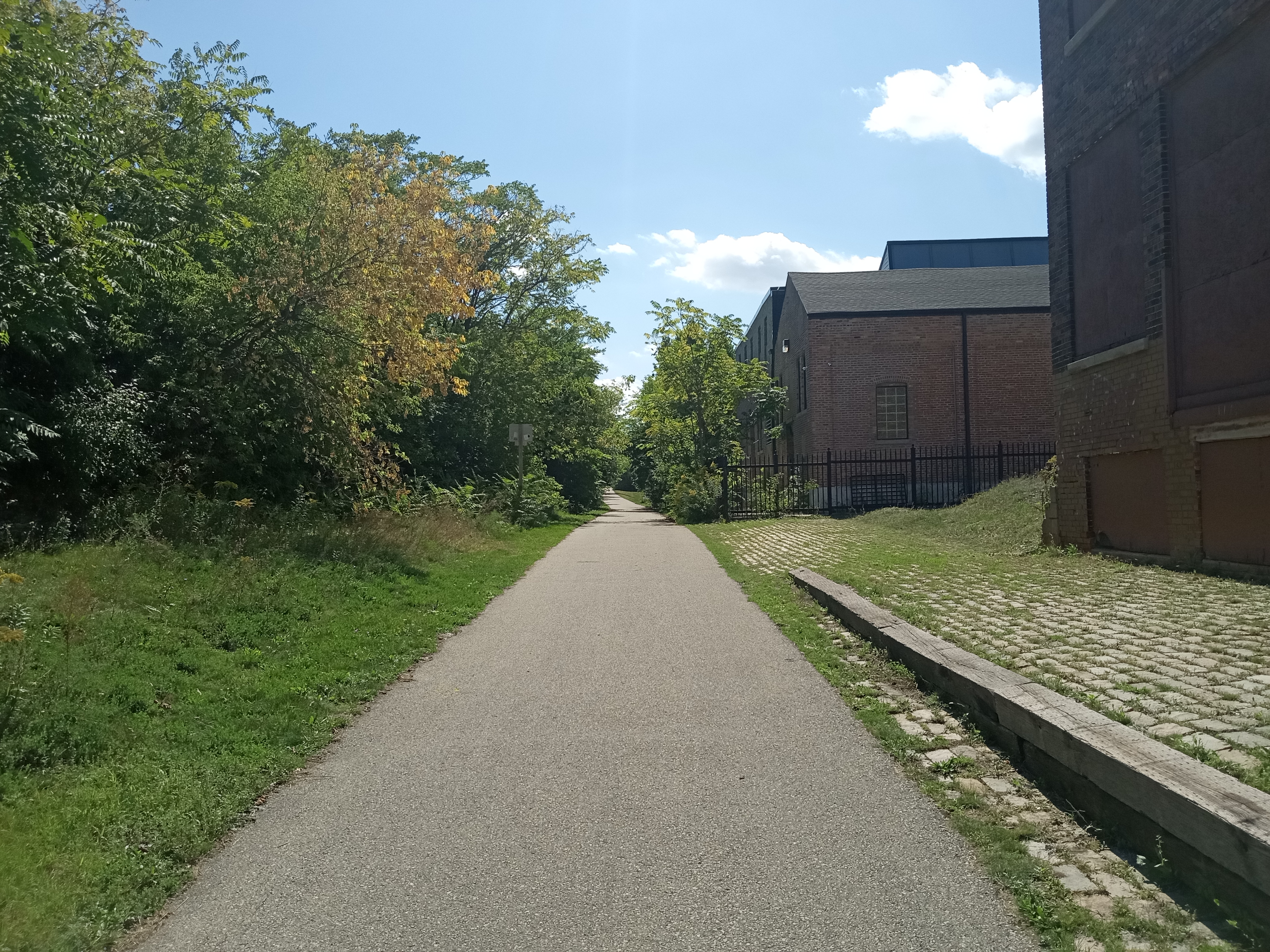
- The Kinnickinnic River Trail at East Washington Street, looking south
- Length: 2.5 mi (4.0 km)
- Location: Milwaukee, Wisconsin
- Established: October 12, 2013
- Use: Shared-use path
- Maintained by: City of Milwaukee
- Website: KK River Trail

The Kinnickinnic River Trail (Spanish: Sendero del Río Kinnickinnic), or KK River Trail, is a 2.5-mile (4.0 km) set of rail trails and bike lanes following the Kinnickinnic River in Milwaukee, Wisconsin.

== History ==
The trail was first proposed by then-mayor John Norquist in 1998 as a means for both commuting and recreation by bicycle, with an estimated five hundred users per day. An organization involved in designing the trail stated that the trail would, for the first time, provide public access to much of the area around the Kinnickinnic River.

In 2001, the City of Milwaukee purchased an abandoned railway for the trail. In October 2006, a meeting soliciting ideas for the trail was held. Construction was underway by June 2013. On October 12, 2013, the trail was officially open.

Following a 2020 grant, in 2022, the City of Milwaukee Department of Public Works began the design process for improving the connections among the off-street sections of the trail, the trail itself, and other nearby trails. The Milwaukee Metropolitan Sewerage District is separately planning a westward extension of the southern section of the trail from South 6th Street to South 16th Street, and the northern end of the southern section is expected to be extended from East Lincoln Avenue to East Becher Street as part of the redevelopment of a former industrial site.

== Route ==
From its northern terminus at Water Street and Pittsburgh Avenue, connecting with an on-street portion of the Hank Aaron State Trail, the trail travels southeast along Water Street as an on-street bike lane, then bends southwest with the street south of Bruce Street. At National Avenue, after crossing a railway, the trail becomes a two-way cycle track bordering the eastern side of Water Street. After a westward street crossing at Washington Street, the trail turns south and becomes a rail trail. This off-street portion of the trail continues until Maple Street, where, after crossing Kinnickinnic Avenue, the trail once again becomes an on-street bike lane headed south on 1st Street. After a street crossing at Lincoln Avenue, the trail once again becomes off-street, curving westward with the Kinnickinnic River until terminating at 6th Street south of Cleveland Avenue, where it connects with an on-street portion of the Oak Leaf Trail Kinnickinnic Line.

As of 2023, the northern section of the trail sees over 96,000 users per year, and the southern section sees over 20,000.

== See also ==
- Beerline Trail
- Cycling in Milwaukee
