= Shared lane marking =

Street marking for cycling/driving mixed use

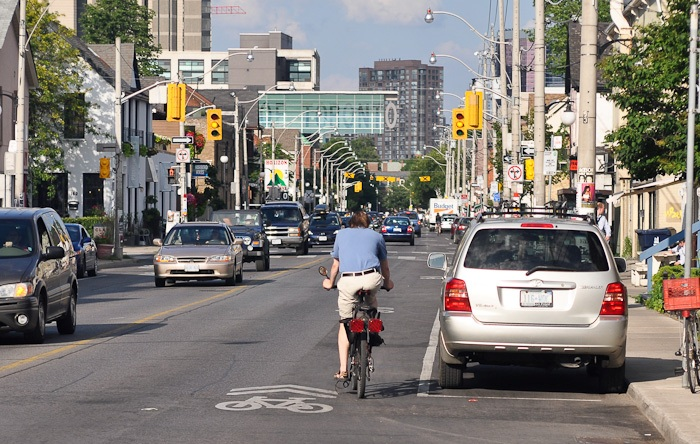
A shared-lane marking in Toronto, Ontario, Canada

A shared lane marking, shared-lane marking, or sharrow is a street marking installed by various jurisdictions worldwide in an attempt to make cycling safer.

== Description ==
These markings are used in New Zealand, Australia, Canada, Spain, the United States and other countries. This marking is placed in the travel lane to indicate where people should preferably cycle.

In US usage, the wide shape of the arrow, combined with the bike symbol, gave rise to unofficial names such as "bike in a house" or "sharrow". In the UK roughly the same function is served by a bicycle symbol without arrows. However, this tends to be used more as an indication of a formal cycle route rather than as an encouragement to share the road.

== History ==
The original "bike in a house" or "man jumping barrels at home" marking was developed by James Mackay and included in the 1993 Denver Bicycle Master Plan. While Mackay had considered a "connect the dots" pavement markings approach for bicycle route definition and cyclist lane positioning reinforcement (during his time as the Bicycle Facilities Engineer for the North Carolina Department of Transportation), the City of Denver's unwillingness to commit to bike lane markings meant that shared lane markings were the only pavement marking treatment for bicyclists that the City would implement. The hollow arrow surrounding the cyclist was intended to reinforce the correct direction of travel for bicyclists (who were frequently observed riding the wrong way, against traffic, in Denver).

In 2004, the city of San Francisco, California, began experimenting with the shared lane marking, and developed a revised symbol consisting of a bicycle symbol with two chevron markings above the bicycle. In the process, the name sharrow was coined by Oliver Gajda, of the City and County of San Francisco Bicycle Program, and is a portmanteau of share and arrow. (Note: Compare Feb 2004 report, which uses shared lane marking, and minutes of July 2004 meeting, which uses sharrow.)

In a 2009 paper, Northeastern University researcher Peter G. Furth proposed the "Bicycle Priority Lane", which combines sharrows with dotted lines inside the usual lane markings. This marks a five-foot-wide zone in the center of the lane which bicyclists are encouraged to use. The city of Boston, Massachusetts, began experimenting with these markings in 2013.

== Effectiveness ==
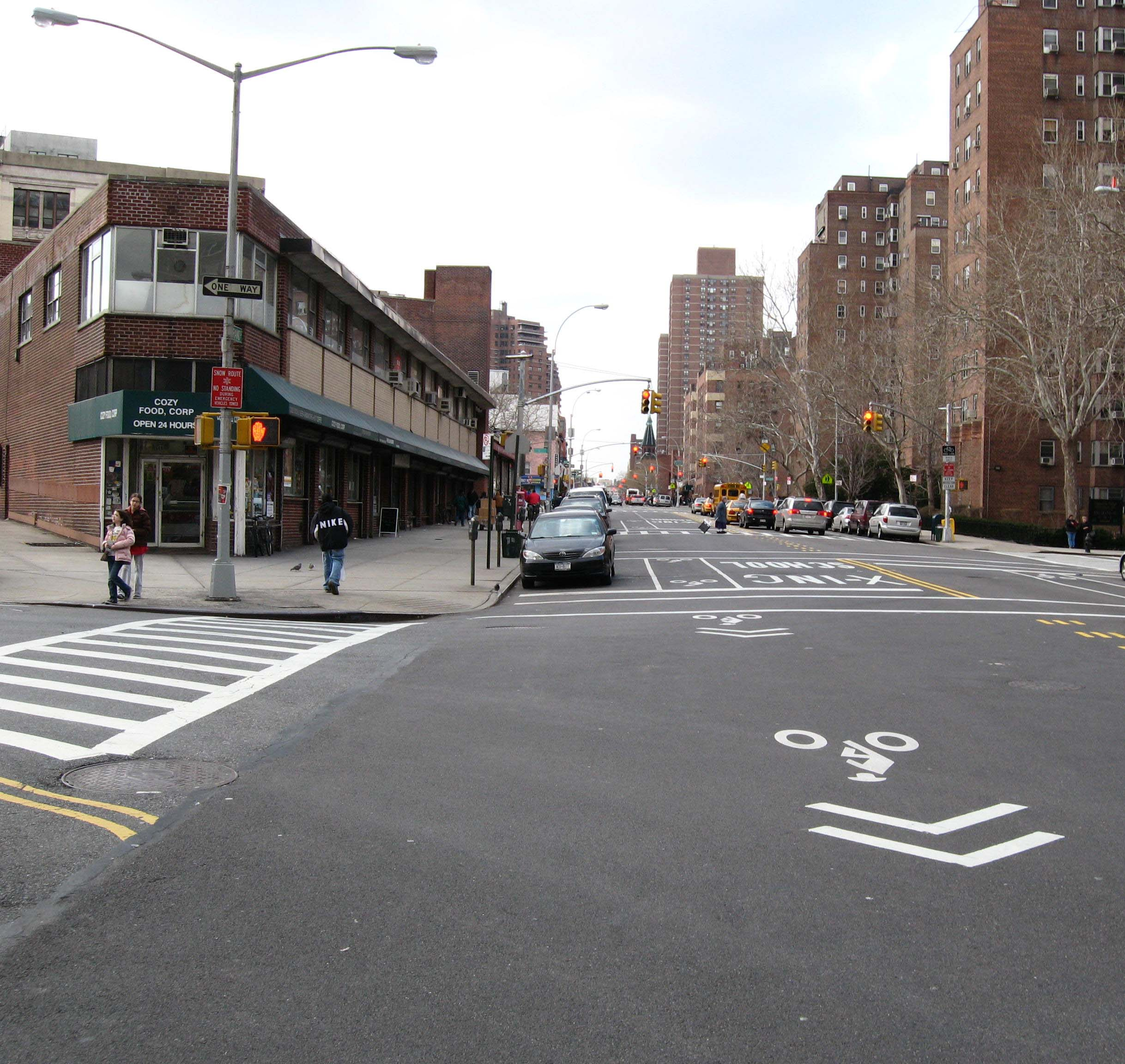
Shared-lane markings alternating with full bike lanes in Grand Street (Manhattan)

Behavioral studies prepared for the Federal Highway Administration and the city of San Francisco have shown that streets with shared lane arrows increase separation between motor vehicles and cyclists, encourage cyclists to ride outside of the door zone, and may reduce wrong way cycling and sidewalk cycling, which are associated with increased crash risk.

However, another study published in the journal Injury Prevention based on hospital records shows no statistically significant reduction in injuries, and possibly a small increase.

A 2016 study commissioned by the Transportation Research Board conducted a comprehensive longitudinal analysis of census block groups in Chicago. Block groups were categorized in one of three categories: block groups with bike lanes installed, block groups with sharrows only, and block groups with no cycling infrastructure. The authors found that blocks with bike lanes experienced a significantly larger increase in bicycle commuters than block groups with sharrows, which were only a bit better than those without infrastructure. Block groups with only sharrows installed were significantly less effective at reducing injuries per year per commuter than both block groups with bike lanes and even as block groups with no infrastructure. The study concludes that these findings raise concerns on the effectiveness of sharrows as a safety measure and as an incentive to bicycle commuting. In the discussion on this study it was criticized that block groups were compared instead of streets.

== Usage ==
=== North America ===
The US Manual on Uniform Traffic Control Devices says shared-lane markings may be used to:

A. Assist cyclists with lateral positioning in a shared lane with on-street parallel parking in order to reduce the chance of a bicyclist impacting the open door of a parked vehicle;

B. Assist cyclists with lateral positioning in lanes that are too narrow for a motor vehicle and a bicycle to travel side by side within the same traffic lane;
C. Alert road users of the lateral location bicyclists are likely to occupy within the traveled way;
D. Encourage safe passing of bicycles by motor vehicles;
E. Reduce the incidence of wrong-way bicycling in the roadway; and

F: Assist bicyclists with lateral positioning in mixing zones.

Based on the San Francisco experimental data, in August 2004, the California Traffic Control Devices Committee (CTCDC) approved the use of this marking in California. In the 2009 edition of the Manual on Uniform Traffic Control Devices, shared lane markings were approved for general use. The city of Seattle, Washington, included extensive use of shared lane markings in its Bicycle Master Plan of early 2007. The concept has since been implemented by cities throughout the United States.

Shared lane marking has been adopted in Canada, being used in localities ranging from Montreal to Vancouver.

=== Worldwide ===
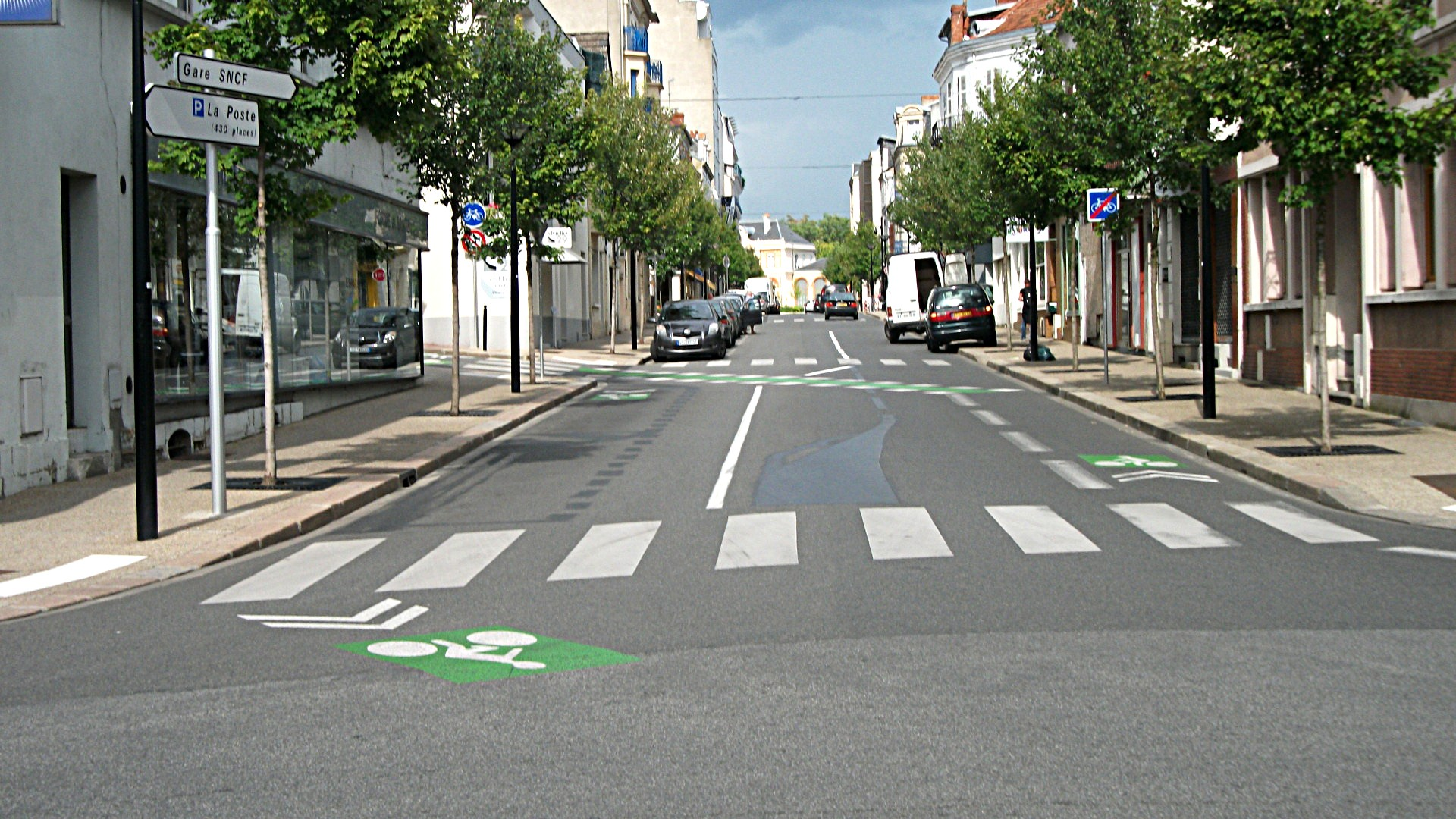
Advisory lane (on the right) and shared lane (on the left) in Vichy, France

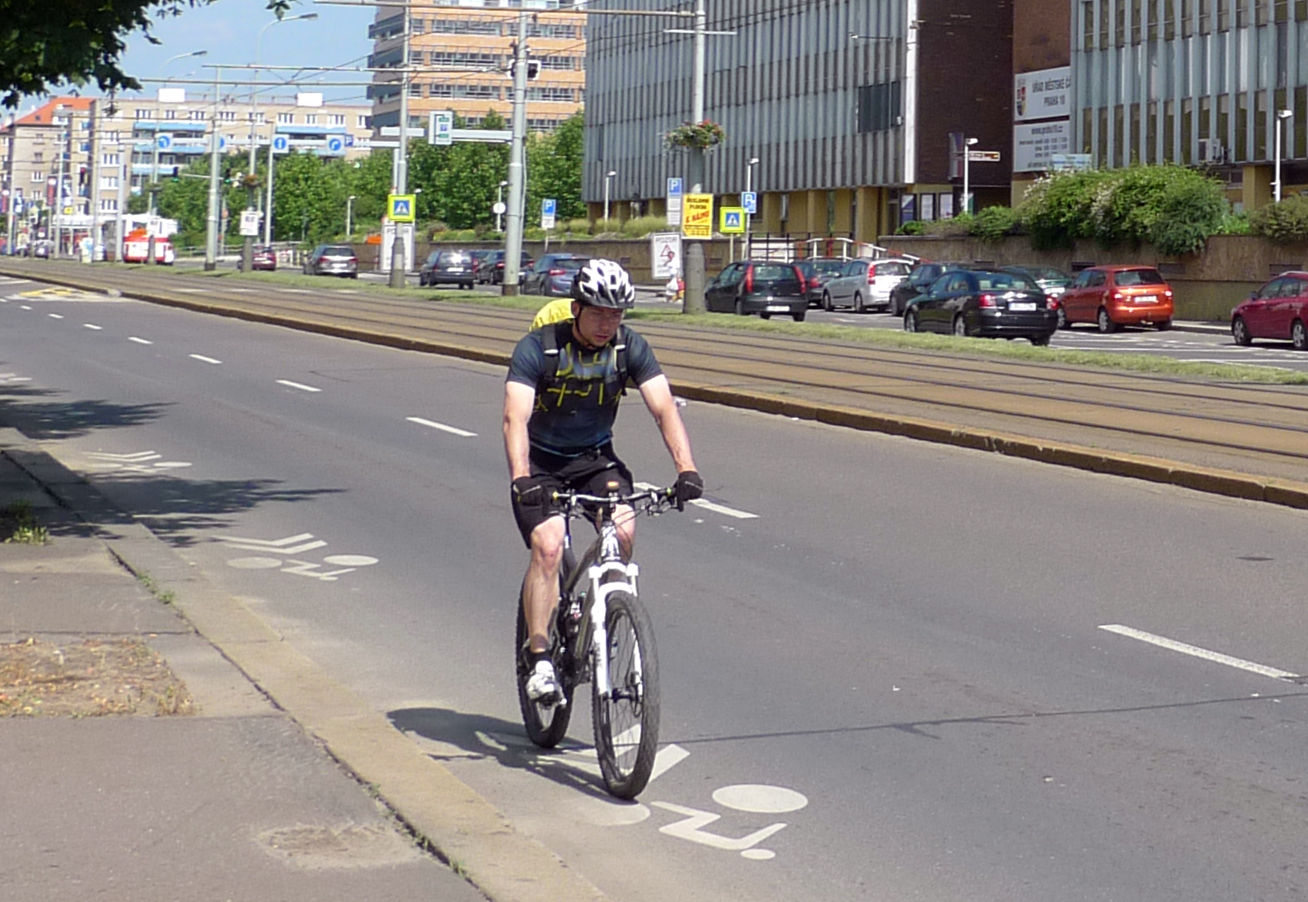
Cyklopiktokoridor in Prague

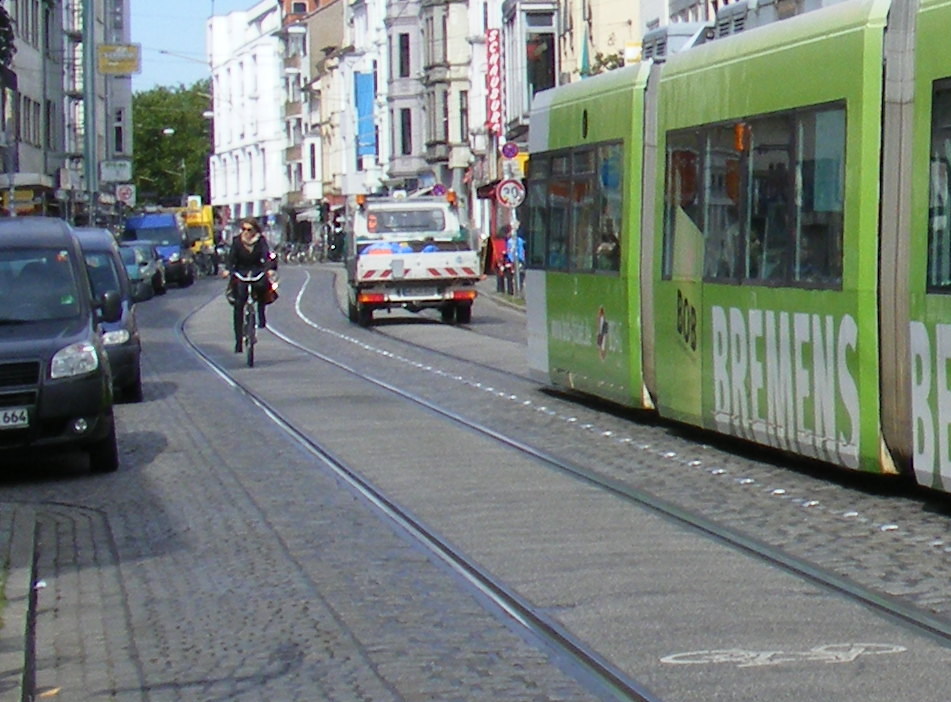
Bike logos between tram rails in Bremen

For several years, the traffic rules of France have allowed shared lanes, they are called voies partagées, in addition to two types of dedicated bike lanes. One of those is obligatory, the other one is not obligatory, but also reserved for bicycles. All have the same pictograms on the street surface, but are distinguished by roadside signs.

In the Czech Republic, a series of sharrows on shared lanes are called Cyklopiktokoridor which translates as "cycle pictogram corridors". For cycle lanes with marked limits, a strict type and a soft type exist (as in France), and are distinguished by different pictograms.

The concept of shared lane markings has also appeared in Spain and New Zealand.

In Germany, the concept is not yet established officially, but some local authorities use simple bike logos for the same purpose, without having a specific term for them.

In Latvia, a single street in its capital Riga has markings indicating the lanes as "recommended cycle lanes", however legally this marking is not defined and consequently there are no differences to any other road with shared traffic.

== See also ==
- Bicycle boulevard
- Complete streets
- Cycling infrastructure
- Lane splitting
- Shared space
