= Raphael Levi Hannover =

German mathematician and astronomer

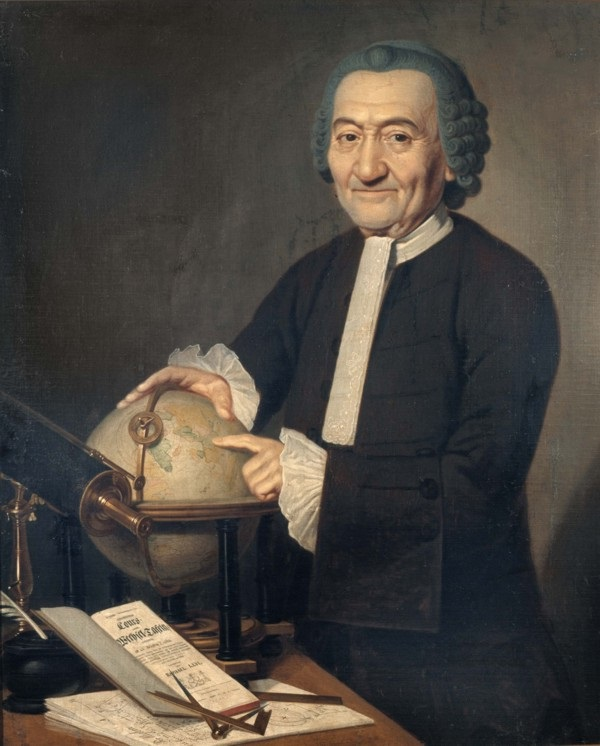
Raphael Levi Hannover

Raphael Levi Hannover (1685 – May 17, 1779) was a German Jewish mathematician and astronomer. The son of Jacob Joseph, Hannover was born at Weikersheim, Franconia in 1685. He was educated at the Jewish school of Hanover and at the yeshivah of Frankfurt am Main, and became bookkeeper in the firm of Simon Wolf Oppenheimer in Hanover. Here he attracted the attention of Leibniz, and for a number of years was one of his most distinguished pupils and lived by him for three years (including last secretary), and afterward teacher of mathematics, astronomy, and natural philosophy. He also corresponded with Moses Mendelssohn.

Raphael Levi Hannover wrote: "Luḥot ha-'Ibbur," astronomical tables for the Jewish calendar; "Tekunat ha-Shamayim," on astronomy and calendar-making, especially commenting on the Talmudical passages on these topics, with glosses of Moses Tiktin. An enlarged revision of the latter work, with two other astronomical works of his, is in manuscript. The "Luḥot ha-'Ibbur" has been published with M. E. Fürth's "Yir'at Shamayim," on Maimonides' "Yad," Ḳiddush ha-Ḥodesh. He died in Hanover in 1779.

== Jewish Encyclopedia bibliography ==
- Fürst, Bibl. Jud. i. 362;
- Steinschneider, Cat. Bodl. col. 2127;
- Zeitlin, Bibl. Post-Mendels, p. 135;
- Orient, 1846, pp. 256 et seq.;
- Blogg, Sefer ha-Ḥayyim, p. 324, Hanover, 1867, where a copy of Hannover's epitaph is given.
