= Bicycle boulevard =

Street designed as a bicycle route

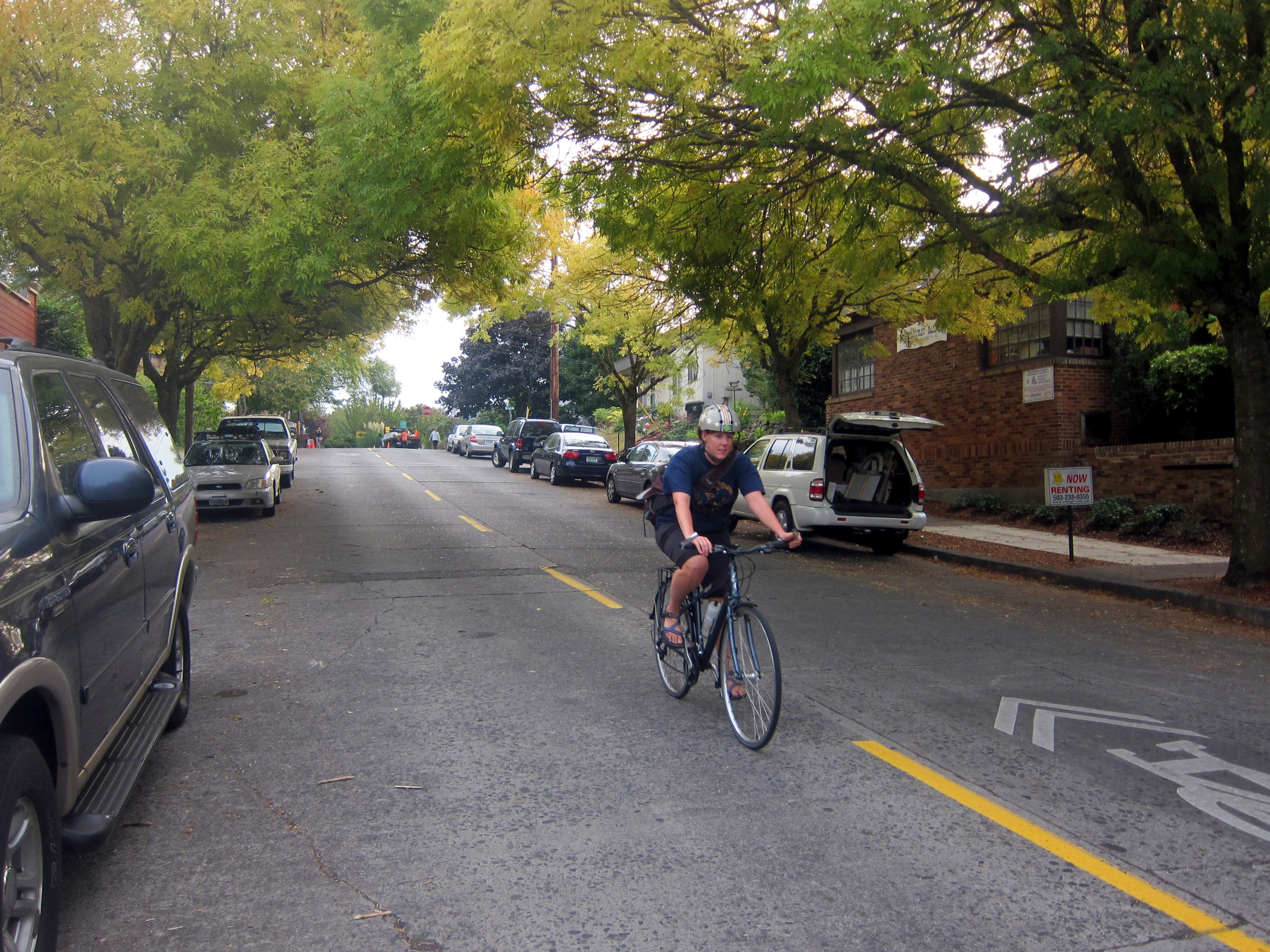
Bicycle boulevard on Ankeny Street in Portland, Oregon

A bicycle boulevard, sometimes referred to as a neighborhood greenway, neighborway, neighborhood bikeway or neighborhood byway is a type of bikeway composed of a low-speed street which has been "optimized" for bicycle traffic. Bicycle boulevards discourage cut-through motor-vehicle traffic but may allow local motor-vehicle traffic at low speeds. They are designed to give priority to bicyclists as through-going traffic. They are intended as a low-cost, politically popular way to create a connected network of streets with good bicyclist comfort and/or safety.

Bicycle boulevards attempt to achieve several goals:

- discouragement of non-local motor vehicle traffic;
- low speed limits;
- low motor-vehicle traffic volumes;
- free-flow travel for bikes by assigning the right-of-way to the bicycle boulevard at intersections wherever possible;
- traffic control to help bicycles cross major arterial roads;
- a distinctive look and/or ambiance such that cyclists become aware of the existence of the bike boulevard and motorists are alerted that the street is a priority route for bicyclists; and,
- enhanced environment due to the promotion of bicycle usage.

These bikeway design elements are intended to appeal to casual, risk-averse, inexperienced and younger bicyclists who would not otherwise be willing to cycle with motor vehicle traffic. Compared to a bike path or rail trail, a bicycle boulevard is also a relatively low-cost approach to appealing to a broader cycling demographic.

== Features ==
A bicycle boulevard is generally marked with a sign at the beginning and the end of the bicycle boulevard. Also necessary for the road to be called a bicycle boulevard is coloring; in the Netherlands, the parts of the road where the cyclists ride on is marked in red (same color as used for segregated cycle facilities in the Netherlands). These sections of the road are called rabatstroken. Motorists also ride on this section, yet also have a non-colored part of the road which they can drive on with one half (two wheels) of the car when they wish to pass a cyclist.

Bicycle boulevards may use a variety of traffic calming elements to achieve a safe environment. This makes it difficult for motorists to use the street at a high speed. However, they do not block access to motor vehicles completely (i.e. using bollards) which would designate the route as segregated cycle facilities rather than a bicycle boulevard.

Some bicycle boulevards have higher road surface standards than other residential streets, and encourage riders to use the full lane, encouraging parity between bicycles and motor vehicles.

=== Discouraging non-local motor vehicle traffic ===
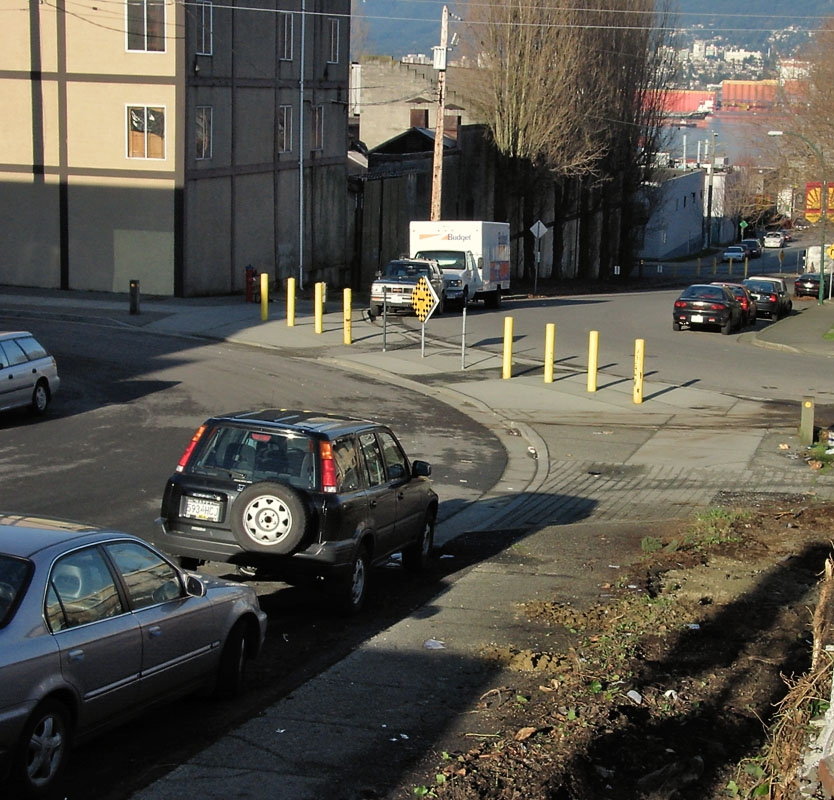
This diverter forces motor vehicles to turn, and allows through passage for bicyclists and pedestrians.

Permeable barriers such as bollards are sometimes used to allow cycling traffic to continue through while diverting motorized traffic from using the street as a through street.

== Locations ==
Road designs of bicycle boulevards can be found in the United States, Canada (Vancouver, Saskatoon, Winnipeg), the Netherlands, Germany, Belgium, Denmark, France, Spain and New Zealand

=== United States ===
Bicycle boulevards can be found in a growing number of United States cities, including:

- Arizona: Tucson
- California: Palo Alto, Berkeley, Emeryville, San Jose, San Luis Obispo, Long Beach
- Florida: Gainesville
- Kansas: Manhattan
- Michigan: Kalamazoo
- Minnesota: Minneapolis, Saint Paul
- Missouri: Columbia
- New Mexico: Albuquerque
- North Carolina: Wilmington
- Oregon: Portland, Eugene, and Bend
- Oklahoma: Tulsa
- Washington: Seattle
- Wisconsin: Madison, Milwaukee

Palo Alto established the first bicycle boulevard in the United States. It was named for Ellen Fletcher, a Holocaust survivor and one of America's first bike activists. It was an overall success minus a few complaints from local residents that were clarified through city council meetings and test pilots.

In Berkeley, boulevards are mostly residential streets, but some sections pass through commercial areas. Generally, there are few cars on these streets, in large part because of the pre-existing traffic calming devices that slow and/or divert traffic. Bicycle boulevards may or may not have bicycle lanes.

In Minneapolis, a grant from the federal government within the Non-Motorized Pilot Program helped to build a bike boulevard on Bryant Avenue and the planning of others.

Similarly in Columbia, the Non-Motorized Pilot Program project helped fund the first bike boulevard in Missouri along Ash and Windsor Streets. At least one other was planned.

In Wilmington, help from a Fit Community 2009 grant through the North Carolina Health and Wellness Trust Fund enabled the City of Wilmington to construct North Carolina's first bicycle boulevard. The Ann Street Bicycle Boulevard runs from South Water Street to South 15th Street and serves as part of the much longer River to the Sea Bikeway, which connects downtown Wilmington to Wrightsville Beach.

In Portland, a $600 million 20-year plan (2010–2030) has the goal of making 25 percent of trips in the city be by bicycle through the establishment of 700 miles (1,100 km) of new bikeways; one of the projects within the plan is to combine the work on street features that reduce stormwater runoff with the construction of curb extensions and other components of bicycle boulevards.

In Albuquerque, a city with more than 400 miles (640 km) of on-street bicycle facilities and multi-use trails, the grand opening of the first bicycle boulevard in New Mexico was held on April 14, 2009. The bicycle boulevard runs from San Mateo Blvd SE, west along Silver Ave SE/SW to 14th St SW. It then continues north on 14th St to Mountain Rd NW. The last leg continues west on Mountain Rd NW to the Paseo del Bosque Recreation Trail which parallels the Rio Grande.

In Madison, the first full bicycle boulevard spans East Mifflin Street in Madisons Tenney-Lapham Neighborhood, a second spans the entire length of Kendall Avenue in University Heights and the Regent Neighborhood.

In Milwaukee, a bicycle boulevard was constructed on Wright Street and Fratney Street which both lead to the Beerline Trail.

In Seattle, the city is implementing a city-wide network of "Neighborhood Greenways". The work is being carried out with the aid and cooperation of the non-profit "Seattle Neighborhood Greenways".

==== US naming conventions ====
The City of Berkeley, California, is credited with coining the phrase bicycle boulevard in the late 1980s, but not every jurisdiction has adopted this term. In November 2011, the City of Boston began to use the term neighborways instead of bicycle boulevards. This added to a growing list of terms for bicycle boulevards since Portland has been calling them neighborhood greenways; Seattle has followed the same convention.

Other terms for bicycle boulevards in the US include:

- Cyclestreets
- Bike boulevards
- Quiet streets
- Neighborhood byways
- Bicycle-friendly streets
- Bicycle-friendly corridors
- Bicycle parkways
- Neighborhood parkways
- Bicycle greenways

=== Netherlands ===
In the Netherlands, fietsstraten ('cycle streets') have a similar road design — although most residential streets in the Netherlands which do not have on-road bike lanes or segregated bike lanes would fit the American definition of bicycle boulevards. A fietsstraat can link dedicated bike-only paths, service roads, and other types of bike-friendly street configurations to complete a route. (Extensive information has been compiled about these facilities at the Pedal Portland blog and the Northeastern University webpage.)

In Amsterdam for example, by 2005 about 40% of journeys were by bicycle and transport planners at the Dienst Infrastructuur Verkeer en Vervoer (Infrastructure Traffic and Transport Directorate) have adopted a bicycle policy that blends many different bike-friendly street designs such as segregated bicycle lanes, on-road bicycle lanes and fietsstraten. The general concept is that cyclists can integrate relatively safely with vehicular traffic that is travelling at, or below, 30 km/h (19 mph) but that segregated bike lanes should be installed along roads with a higher speed limit. With these, and many other, bike-friendly policies in place, Amsterdam has the highest rate of cycling of any capital city in the world. Cycle streets are also on the rise in other cities within the country, including Utrecht.

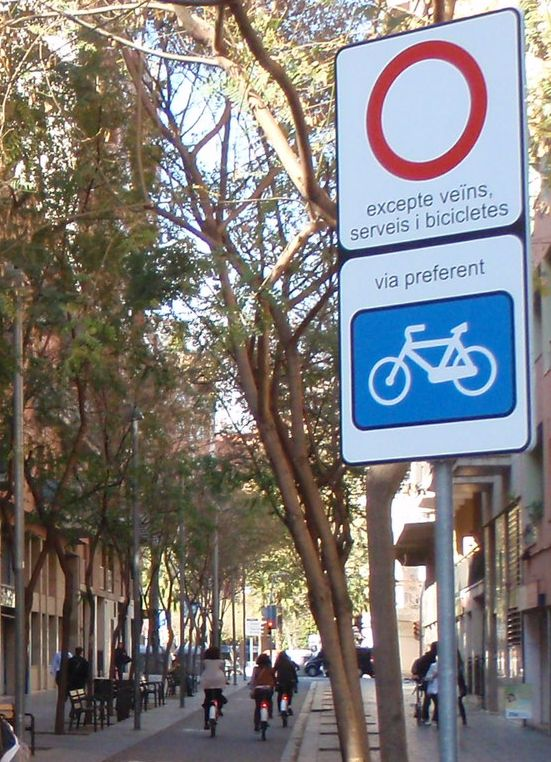
Bicycle boulevard in Barcelona, Spain

=== Germany ===
In Germany a comparable road design is called Fahrradstraße ('bicycle road'), introduced into the Highway Code in 1997. Any other vehicles are prohibited unless marked with an additional sign.

=== Belgium ===
In Belgium, the Fietsstraat (in Dutch/Flemish) or rue cyclable (in French), was introduced into the Highway Code with effect from 13 February 2012. One had earlier been introduced in the Visserij in Ghent (Gent) in the summer of 2011. The first one in Brussels appeared in 2013 on a service road alongside Avenue Louise.

The OpenStreetMap wiki and also the several locations on this subject may be of interest to reader.

=== Denmark ===
In Denmark, the first cykelgade ('cycle street') was opened in 2011 in Aarhus. Since then cycle streets have been implemented in several cities across the country.

Almost all Danish cycle streets allow motorized vehicles to drive on them, although some might be one way only. The speed limit is 50 km/h although the law states that drivers should limit their speed to that of cyclists, normally under 30 km/h

=== France ===
In France, the equivalent road design is called vélorue ('bike street') or rue cyclable ('cycle street'). The cities of Strasbourg (2017), Bordeaux (2018), Dijon (2019), Rennes (2023), Paris (2023), Lille (2023) and Lyon (2024) are among the first to test it out.

=== Spain ===
In Spain, cycle streets are known as ciclocalles.

=== Sweden ===
In Sweden cycle streets are known as Cykelgata and was introduced in december 2020.

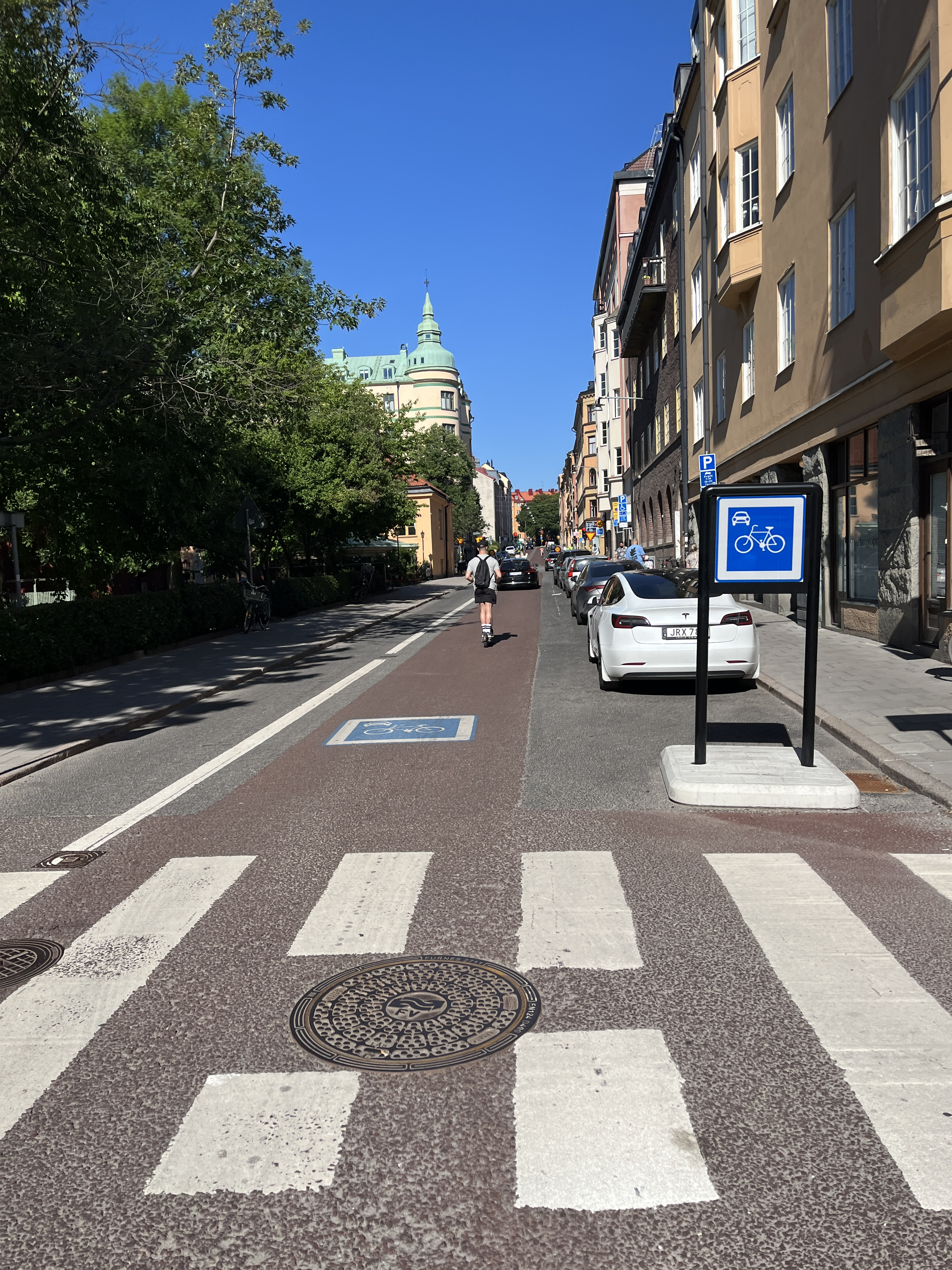
A cycle street in Stockholm, Sweden

=== New Zealand ===
In New Zealand, bicycle boulevards are generally designated as 'neighbourhood greenways', although Auckland refers to them as local paths to avoid confusion with its off-road greenways network. Christchurch was the first city to implement a number of neighbourhood greenway sections as part of its Major Cycle Routes programme, including the Rapanui–Shag Rock Stage 1 through Linwood.

=== United Kingdom ===
British cycle-infrastructure design regulations (LTN 1/20) do not yet define an equivalent facility, although there are similar provisions, called Home Zone and Quiet Lane, where motor traffic is deprioritised. “England's first Cycle Street” is being planned in Adams Road, Cambridge for spring 2026.

== See also ==
- Outline of cycling
- Cycling infrastructure
- Shared lane marking
