= Furth =

Furth or Fürth may refer to:

- Fürth (surname)
- Fürth, northern Bavaria, Germany
- Fürth (district), Bavaria, Germany
- Fürth (electoral district). Bavaria, Germany
- Furth, Lower Bavaria, Bavaria, Germany
- Fürth, Hesse, Germany
- Furth, part of Gloggnitz, Lower Austria
- Furth, part of Maria Anzbach, Lower Austria
- Furth (mountain), a British classification of hills
- Furth im Wald, Bavaria, near the Czech Republic
- SpVgg Greuther Fürth, a German football club based in Fürth, Bavaria
