= Greenfield Park (West Allis) =

County park in West Allis, Wisconsin

Coordinates: 43.010°N 88.062°W

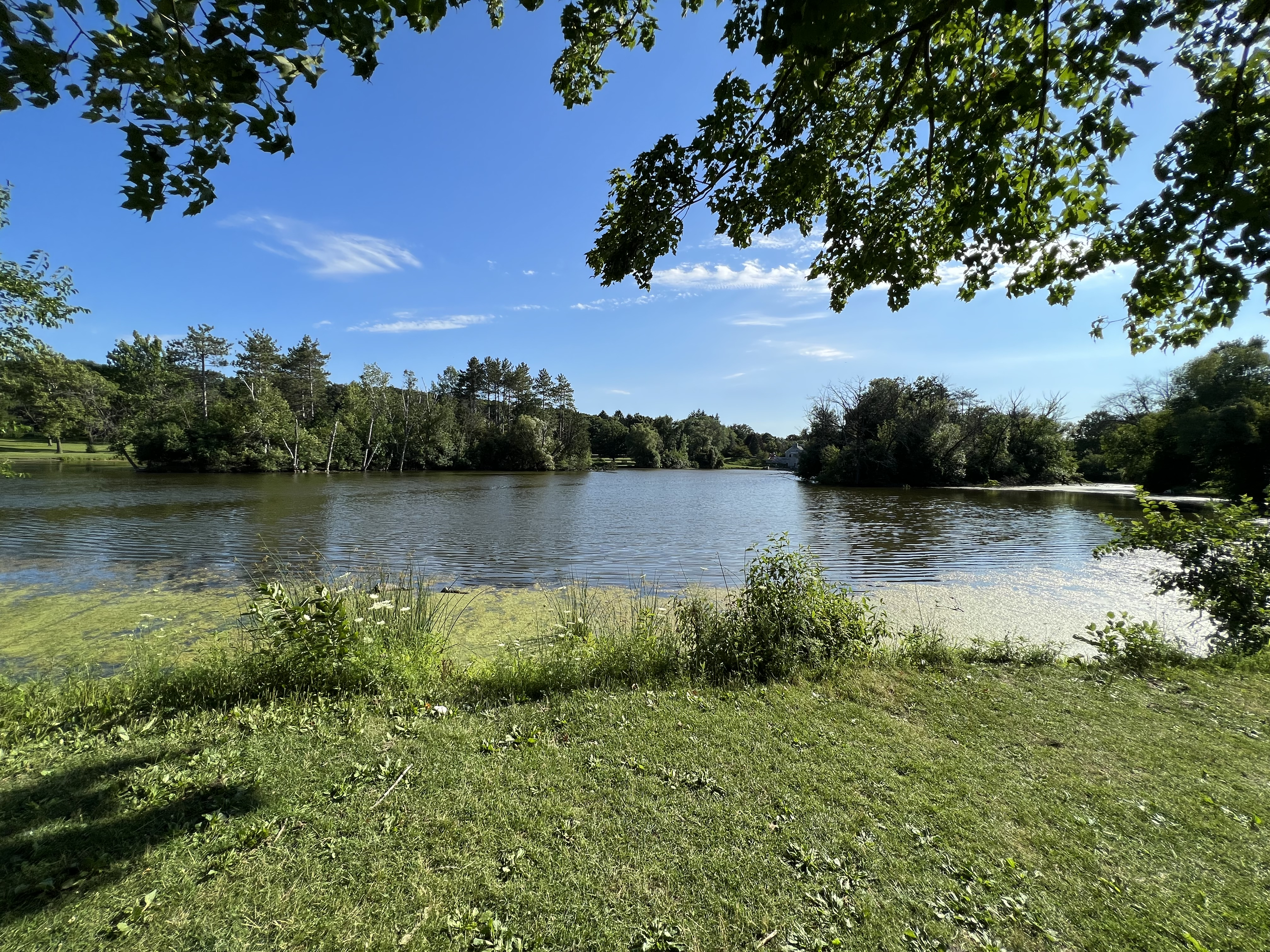
Greenfield Park lagoon

Greenfield Park (1921) is a park in West Allis, Wisconsin, Milwaukee County in the United States. The park features a lake, aquatic recreation areas and a golf course which was added in 1923. The park was added to the Wisconsin Architecture and History Inventory in 2011.

== History ==
The land which makes up Greenfield Park was purchased by Milwaukee County, Wisconsin in 1921. Fifteen years later the park land included 278 acres. The park was surveyed in 2011 and added to the Wisconsin Architecture and History Inventory. The park is on the western county line bordering Waukesha County, Wisconsin. In 1923 a golf course which was added to the park: it was updated in 2015.

On March 19, 1928, the park's golf clubhouse was destroyed by a fire. The Park Commission stated that the building insurance nearly covered the loss, and they planned to build a new clubhouse which would be ready for the 1929 golf season.

== Description ==
The park now includes 282.3 acres and features a lagoon with a 0.6 mile circumference, a golf course and a P-50 tornado siren. The golf course covers 6,000 yards (5,500 m). The park also features an aquatic park with pools and splash pads.

The lagoon/lake is six acres with a depth of 15 feet (4.6 m) and fish in the lake include: largemouth bass and other panfish.

The Oak Leaf Trail Root River Line runs through the park, intersecting with the New Berlin Trail and West Allis Cross-Town Connector near the center of the park.

== See also ==
- Parks of Milwaukee
