= New Berlin Trail =

Trail in Waukesha County, Wisconsin

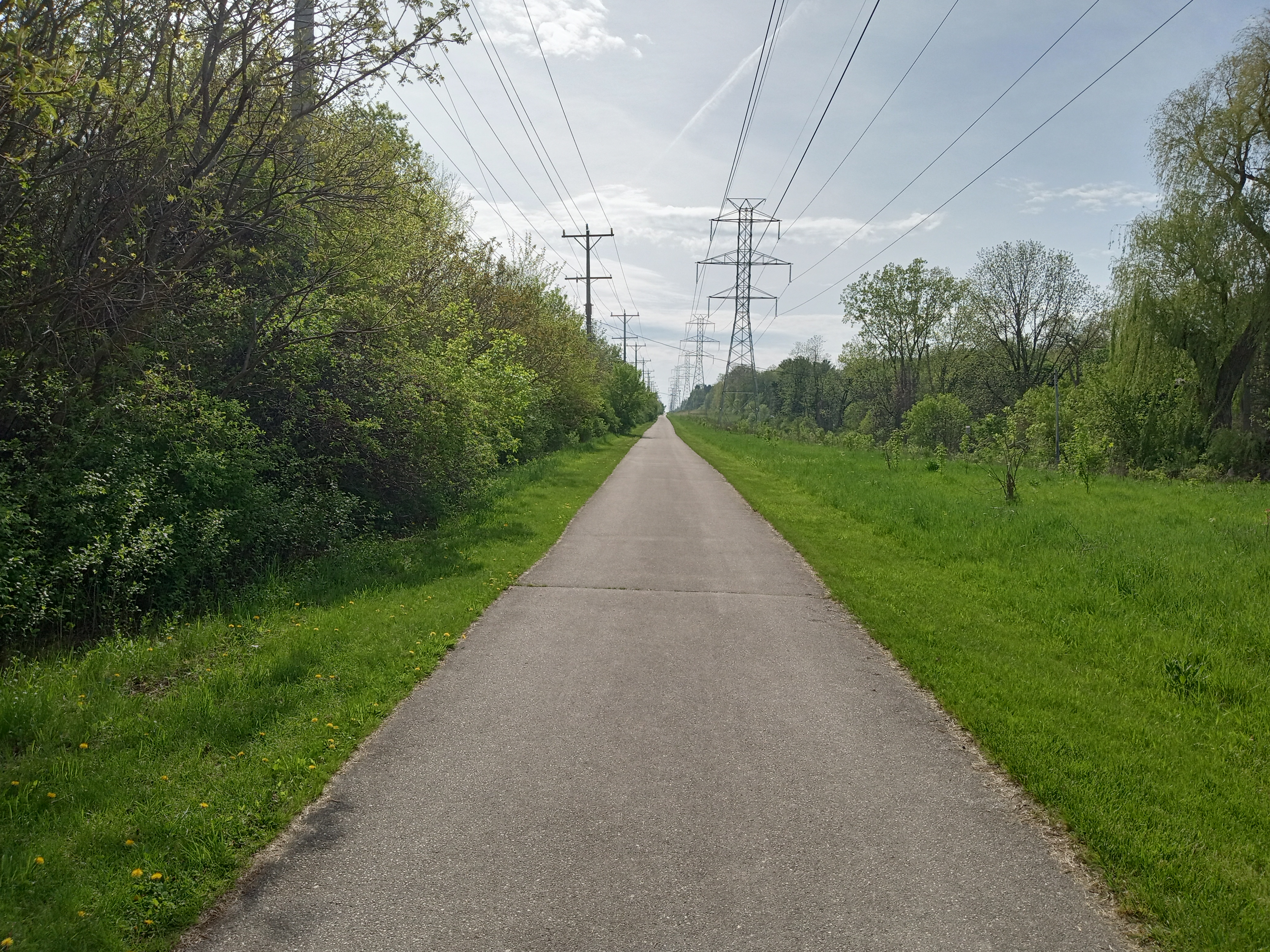
- The New Berlin Trail near its eastern end, looking west
- Length: 7 mi (11 km)
- Location: Waukesha County, Wisconsin
- Established: May 19, 1984
- Designation: U.S. Bicycle Route 30
- Use: Shared-use path
- Maintained by: Waukesha County Park System
- Website: Waukesha County Park System Trails

The New Berlin Trail (or New Berlin Recreation Trail) is a 7-mile (11 km) shared-use path in Waukesha County, Wisconsin. It follows a former interurban route and a set of We Energies power lines.

== History ==
The railroad lining the trail was constructed in 1898 by The Milwaukee Electric Railway and Light Company as part of a Milwaukee-Waukesha interurban route, then fell into disuse in 1951.

Planning for the trail began in 1973, though construction did not begin until the fall of 1983. Original plans called for the use of city streets in New Berlin to connect the trail with Greenfield Park, but this connection was substituted with the creation of a bridge over 124th Street after the New Berlin Common Council dropped its support for the idea in December 1981. The trail was dedicated on May 19, 1984, with an initial length of six miles from 124th Street to Springdale Road.

In the fall of 1998, a one-mile extension from Springdale Road to Lincoln Avenue was added. The trail was paved in June 2006.

In 2020, the trail was designated part of U.S. Bicycle Route 30.

=== Eastward continuation ===
In 2004, the City of West Allis began planning the Cross-Town Connector Route, which would have stretched from Greenfield Park to the Hank Aaron State Trail via a United States Department of Veterans Affairs-owned property. It opened the first segment of the West Allis Cross-Town Connector in 2013, acting as an eastward continuation of the New Berlin Trail from Greenfield Park to Wisconsin Highway 100. By 2018, plans to extend the Connector further eastward were delayed by bids for a bridge over Highway 100 being overbudget and the Union Pacific Railroad resisting efforts to allow bicycle traffic to cross two spur lines. These reasons, additional engineering concerns, pressure from the Wisconsin Department of Transportation, and the Wisconsin Legislature banning eminent domain for bike trail purposes led to the City considering abandoning the project. The built section of the West Allis Cross-Town Connector totals 0.9 miles (1.4 km).

=== Westward continuation ===
A separate trail acting as a westward continuation of the New Berlin Trail into the City of Waukesha was built in two phases: the Barstow to Frederick Street connector in 2018, and a connection between the connector and the New Berlin Trail through an Eaton Corporation-owned facility in 2022. These connections total 1.3 miles (2.1 km).

== Route ==
The trail runs from Lincoln Avenue in the City of Waukesha (43.0101°N 88.2066°W) in the west to 124th Street at the Waukesha County-Milwaukee County border (43.0104°N 88.0641°W) in the east. At its eastern end, it connects with the Oak Leaf Trail and the West Allis Cross-Town Connector. At its western end, it connects with the Glacial Drumlin State Trail and the Barstow to Frederick Street connector.

== See also ==
- Hank Aaron State Trail
