= A Place to Sit =

Artwork by Kathryn E. Martin in Milwaukee, USA

- Artist: kathryn e. martin
- Year: 2009
- Type: Public Art, Sculpture
- Dimensions: 240 cm × 61 cm × 61 cm (96 in × 24 in × 24 in)
- Location: Art Look of the Hank Aaron State Trail, Milwaukee; 43°1′56.667″N 87°55′48.104″W

A Place to Sit is a public artwork by American artist Kathryn E. Martin, located along the Art Look of the Hank Aaron State Trail, situated on the south side of the Menomonee River, in the city of Milwaukee, Milwaukee County, Wisconsin. The work was dedicated on October 8, 2009.

== Historical information ==
A Place to Sit is a site-specific public artwork located in the Hank Aaron State Trail art loop. It consists of high-back chairs on which you can actually sit. "kathryn e. martin was selected for this installation through a Request for Proposal and juried process by the Art Committee of the Friends of the Hank Aaron State Trail."

"The high-back chairs of A Place to Sit honor the spirit and people of Wisconsin's American Indian tribes."

Before the onset of industry and European settlement, the Menomonee Valley was a vast marsh that extended from Lake Michigan to Miller Park. This was fertile ground for the harvesting of wild rice by American Indians. On an annual basis, various tribes came together peacefully to harvest rice, to carry them through the long winter. The arrival of Europeans disrupted Native American life. As Europeans began to settle in the area, American Indians were displaced and the marsh was filled to provide land for industry. Local historian John Gurda describes the turmoil as a "game of musical chairs. In the end, it was the Indians who had nowhere to sit."

=== Location history ===
A Place to Sit was made specifically for the Art Loop of the Hank Aaron State Trail thanks to Melissa Cook, Wisconsin Department of Natural Resources manager of the Valley's Hank Aaron State Trail, and Annemarie Sawkins, chair of the Friends of the Hank Aaron State Trail public art committee

== Artist ==
kathryn e. martin is an instructor at the University of Wisconsin–Milwaukee (UWM) where she teaches to Foundation and upper level Sculpture students. martin, who does not capitalize her name, received a BFA in Sculpture and Art History from MIAD, and an MA and MFA from UWM in InterMedia Studies. This was her first permanent, public sculpture. She is also known under the name Katie Martin-Meurer.
