= Hank Aaron State Trail =

Shared use path in Milwaukee County, Wisconsin

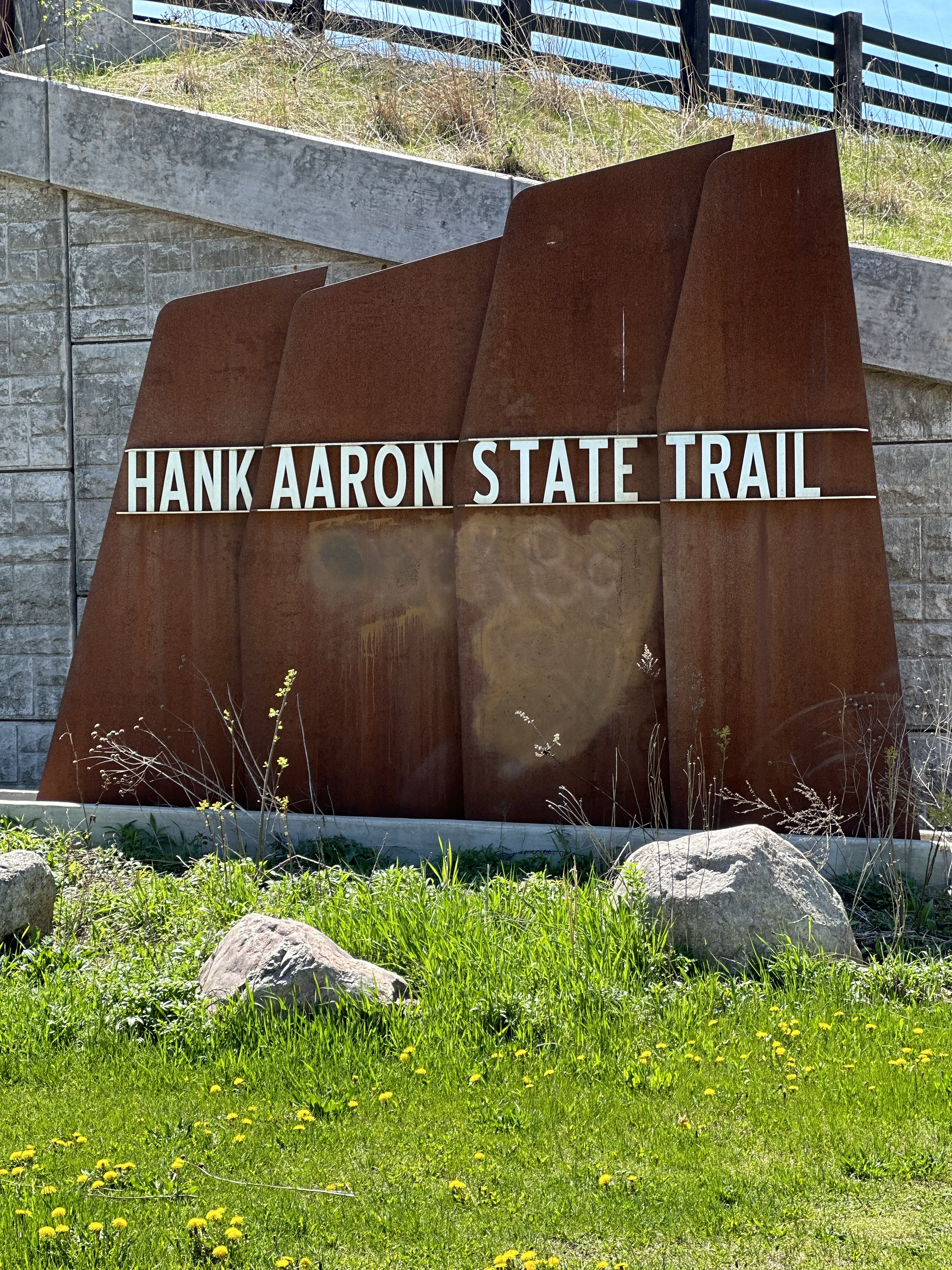
- Hank Aaron State Trail sign on Hawley Road in West Allis, Wisconsin
- Length: 15.2 mi (24.5 km)
- Location: Milwaukee County, Wisconsin, United States
- Established: August 19, 2000
- Designation: U.S. Bicycle Route 30
- Trailheads: Lakeshore State Park; Underwood Parkway, Wauwatosa, Wisconsin
- Use: Shared-use path
- Elevation gain/loss: +272 feet (83 m) going westward
- Website: dnr.wisconsin.gov/topic/parks/hankaaron

The Hank Aaron State Trail is a 15.2-mile (24.5 km) shared-use path in Milwaukee County, Wisconsin, United States. It was named after former Milwaukee Braves and Milwaukee Brewers right fielder Hank Aaron, the trail travels east-west between Lakeshore State Park in Milwaukee and Underwood Parkway in Wauwatosa via the Menomonee Valley. It is composed of rail trail, Menomonee River-following, and on-street segments. The trail sees approximately 200,000 users each year.

== History ==
Planning for the project began in 1991 when the Wisconsin State Legislature directed the Department of Natural Resources (DNR) to study the feasibility of creating a park next to Milwaukee County Stadium. At the time, the proposed park was referred to as Henry Aaron State Park. Input from local stakeholders, such as a recommendation by then-mayor John Norquist's Bicycle Task Force to develop an east-west trail through the Menomonee Valley, led to the project focus changing toward creating a multi-mile urban greenway along the Menomonee River. This greenway was originally named the Menomonee River Greenway, then renamed the Henry Aaron State Park Trail. A report by the DNR suggested that developing the trail would help remediate over a century of industrial pollution of the river, meet demand for more public open spaces, and reverse the effects of inner-city abandonment. The trail was envisioned to follow the southern edge of the river from South 2nd Street to Doyne Park, where it would meet the Milwaukee County 76 Bike Trail (now Oak Leaf Trail). The plan was approved by then-governor Tommy Thompson in 1997.

The trail opened in 2000 as the Hank Aaron State Trail with a length of only one-third of a mile (0.54 km), near American Family Field, though a segment between 13th Street and 25th Street was added shortly after. Original plans called for the trail bordering the southern side of the Menomonee River between 26th Street and American Family Field, crossing the Canadian Pacific Railway Muskego Yard, but in 2003, officials began to consider having the trail border an extension of Canal Street in this section. By August 2006, the trail stretched from Lakeshore State Park in the east to American Family Field in the west, with a length of roughly five and a half miles (8.9 km).

In 2010, a four-mile (6.4 km) westward extension to 94th Place was completed via a former railroad right-of-way, setting the total trail length to ten miles (16 km). In November 2011, the trail was expanded from 94th Place to Underwood Parkway, though this section was composed of compacted gravel instead of being paved as the other sections had been. In 2012, construction began on a one-mile (1.6 km) spur connecting to Mitchell Park Horticultural Conservatory; by next year, it, along with the then-new Three Bridges Park it passes through, were open. In 2014, a connection between the trail at 6th Street and Freshwater Way was added, giving users coming from the south a non-motorized route for reaching the trail. In 2018, the compacted gravel section of the trail west of 94th Place was paved as part of reconstructing of the Zoo Interchange. In 2019, a connection to Wisconsin Highway 100 near the Milwaukee County Zoo was added.

In 2020, the trail was designated part of U.S. Bicycle Route 30. As of 2023, according to the Wisconsin Department of Natural Resources, approximately 200,000 people use the trail annually.

== Route ==
Hank Aaron State Trail western trailhead

The trail is open to walkers, joggers, bicyclists, and in-line skaters. Much of the trail is accessible to people with disabilities.

The trail begins on the shore of Lake Michigan in Lakeshore State Park, near Henry Maier Festival Park. It travels west on city streets through Milwaukee until reaching West Pittsburgh Avenue, where a ramp leads up to the Sixth Street South Viaduct. Going north, at the intersection with West Canal Street, the trail borders the roadway westward until approaching South 37th Street, where it becomes a rail trail. It continues west, traveling through the Milwaukee Soldiers Home (Old Main) and Wisconsin State Fair Park and passing near the Milwaukee County Zoo before ending at an intersection with the Oak Leaf Trail at Underwood Parkway in Wauwatosa, Wisconsin. The elevation increases by 272 feet (83 m) when traveling westward.

An eastward spur connects to Mitchell Park by way of Three Bridges Park, a former rail yard which was converted into a 24-acre (9.7 ha) green space in 2013, while a northwestward spur provides access to American Family Field. Scenic loops branch from the mainline trail to follow and provide access to the Menomonee River.

== Artwork ==
Several works of art adorn the trail. Some works are three-dimensional sculptures or interactive pieces. A Place to Sit recognizes the Native Americans that had been displaced from the Menomonee Valley. Bird Bike is an interactive stationary bicycle that powers a mechanical bird's wings. History of West Allis highlights West Allis's historical roles in manufacturing, the Manhattan Project, hosting the Wisconsin State Fair, the railroad industry, and providing for veterans. People of the Road is a set of five metal sculptures honoring the workers of the Milwaukee Road, depicting employees performing tasks in the shops that formerly occupied the site. Three copper streetcar shelters, originally constructed by the City of Milwaukee in 1929 and used on the 16th Street Viaduct, were refurbished at a cost of $120,000 to become resting areas and information kiosks.

Other works are two-dimensional paintings or murals. The Civil Rights River Loop Murals share quotations from Chief Joseph and Benito Juárez while teaching about the open housing racial justice protests led by James Groppi nearby in the late 1960s. The Kelmann Restoration mural is a 130-foot (40 m) long painting that mixes native elements of the southeastern Wisconsin landscape with scenes of building restorations. March On depicts silhouettes marching in front of a sunset, celebrating the 40-year anniversary of the open housing protests. The Valley Passage Mural mixes a depiction of what is on the other side of the tunnel it is painted on with what used to be there in the past.

== Recognition ==
Before the trail was formally dedicated in 2000, the White House Millennium Council designated it a Millennium Legacy Trail due to "its respectful celebration of the past, its connection to the community, and its far-reaching vision for the future."

At the dedication ceremony, Hank Aaron spoke to how honored he was to have the trail named after him and hoped future generations would see how much being welcomed by the people of Milwaukee meant to "a young baseball player so many, many years ago." When informed about progress on developing the trail, he expressed pleasure at the number of children and diverse neighborhoods that would have access to it. He regularly traveled to Milwaukee to be at trail-related events over the years until his death in 2021.

The route of the trail through Three Bridges Park won an Honor Award from the American Society of Landscape Architects in 2011 for how it accommodated the large age range of students at the nearby Urban Ecology Center without unnecessarily dividing the park.

== See also ==
- Kinnickinnic River Trail
- New Berlin Trail
