= Waukesha County Park System =

System of parks in Wisconsin, United States

- Type: Public park system
- Location: Waukesha County, Wisconsin
- Nearest city: Waukesha, Wisconsin
- Area: 8,500 acres (3,400 ha)
- Open: Daily, sunrise – 10 p.m.
- Website: waukeshacounty.gov/parksystem

Waukesha County Park System is located in Waukesha County, Wisconsin. It is composed of nine different parks throughout the county: Fox Brook Park, Fox River Park, Menomonee Park, Minooka Park, Mukwonago Park, Muskego Park, Naga-Waukee Park, and Nashotah Park. "From swimming to camping to hiking and cross-country skiing, each park has its own personality." The park system also has five lake accesses: Ashippun Lake, Nagawicka Lake, Nemahbin, Pewaukee Lake, and School Section; two golf courses: Naga-Waukee War Memorial, and Moors Down; two ice arenas: Naga-Waukee and Eble; Retzer Nature Center; and the Waukesha County Expo Center. Dogs are permitted at all parks with the exception of Retzer Nature Center. Minooka Park, Mukwonago Park and Nashotah Park offer the community fenced in dog parks.

| Park | Coordinates | Photo |
|---|---|---|
| Fox Brook Park | | |
| Fox River Park | | |
| Menomonee Park | | |
| Minooka Park | | |
| Mukwonago Park | | |
| Muskego Park | | |
| Naga-Waukee Park | | |
| Nashotah Park | | |
| Ryan Park | | |
