= Hans G. Furth =

Austrian developmental psychologist

- Born: Hans Gerhard Fürth; December 2, 1920; Vienna, First Austrian Republic
- Died: November 7, 1999 (aged 78); Takoma Park, Maryland, U.S.
- Education: University of Ottawa; Portland State University
- Scientific career
- Fields: Developmental psychology
- Workplaces: Catholic University of America

British internment camp for Jewish refugees in Huyton

Hans G. Furth (born Hans Gerhard Fürth (Austrian German: [fʏrt]; December 2, 1920 – November 7, 1999) was an Austrian developmental psychologist who was professor emeritus in the Faculty of Psychology of the Catholic University of America in Washington, D.C.

== Early life in Europe ==
Hans Gerhard Fürth was born to Jewish parents in Austria and baptized into the Catholic Church at the age of 16. As a child, he was trained in classical piano and active in Austrian Boy Scouts. Shortly after the 1938 Anschluss of Austria into Germany, Furth fled the Nazis; first to Croatia, as a dependent of his mother who had married an elderly Croatian acquaintance to gain entry into that country. Upon achieving the age of majority, Fürth would have been evicted from Croatia, so he obtained a visa to travel to Belgium. En route, he jumped off his train in Switzerland, and lived illegally with a Swiss family. From Switzerland, he obtained a visa to travel to the United Kingdom by volunteering to work in the Australian outback. After arriving in England, he abandoned the Australian venture, and lived with a professor of music. He graduated from the Royal Academy of Music in London in 1940 hoping to become a concert pianist and, after being interned as an enemy alien, performed at internment camps for Jewish refugees in various locations throughout Britain (pictured), as well as Hutchinson Camp on the Isle of Man. He spent the next decade as a monk in the Carthusian order and then emigrated to North America.

== Career in North America ==
Fürth received a master's degree in clinical psychology from the University of Ottawa in 1954 and a doctorate degree in psychology from Portland State University in 1960. In the same year, he became a professor of psychology at Catholic University of America, in Washington, D.C.

Fürth wrote ten published books on child development between 1966 and 1999. One of them, Piaget and Knowledge: Theoretical Foundations (published by Prentice-Hall in 1969) became a bestseller. After retiring from full-time teaching in 1990, Fürth focused on writing about his past and completed a manuscript entitled "Society Faces Extinction: The Psychology of Auschwitz and Hiroshima." He wrote the essay "One million Polish rescuers of hunted Jews?" published in the Journal of Genocide Research.

Hans G. Fürth specialized in developmental psychology. His earliest book, Thinking Without Language: Psychological Implications of Deafness, was an examination of the silent language of the deaf and its teaching methods. Fürth found that deaf children had cognitive skills comparable to hearing children, even when they had neither verbal nor sign language. He argued in favor of educating deaf children in sign language rather than mainstreaming, which was the prevailing method at the time.

Fürth popularized the philosophy of Swiss child development psychologist Jean Piaget, with whom he worked at the University of Geneva in the mid-1960s. His books utilized Piaget's largely abstract concepts, including the notion that children left unattended continually rethink their understanding of the world and, as such, do not wait for educators to fill them with structured knowledge. A longtime colleague of Fürth's, James Youniss, said Fürth's "intensity" inspired leading developmental psychologists to embark on similar careers.

== Later interests ==
Fürth and his wife, Madeleine Steen Furth (d. 2011), were active in the civil rights movement, offering their home in Washington, D.C., to protesters who marched with Martin Luther King Jr. in August 1963. Fürth had seven children: Sonia, Peter, Julie, Daniel, David, Paul, and Cathy, and left a score of grandchildren.

In the last decade of his life, Hans G. Fürth often performed at area nursing homes, playing works of Bach, Beethoven, and Mozart. He was an avid hiker and cyclist, a member of the Wanderbirds Hiking Club. He had a heart attack that killed him while hiking in Shenandoah National Park.

== Selected works ==
- Furth, H.G. 1966. Thinking without Language. Psychological Implications of Deafness. New York: The Free Press.
- Furth, H.G. 1969. Piaget and Knowledge: Theoretical Foundations. Chicago: University of Chicago Press. 2nd ed., 1981. [cc]
- Furth, H.G. 1969. Intelligenz und Erkennen. Die Grundlagen der genetischen Erkenntnistheorie Piagets. Frankfurt am Main: Suhrkamp.
- Furth, H.G. and Harry Wachs, 1975. Thinking Goes to School. Piaget's Theory in Practice. ISBN 978-0-19-501927-8
- Furth, H.G. 1987. Knowledge As Desire: An Essay on Freud and Piaget. New York: Columbia University Press. ISBN 0-231-06458-6
- Furth, H.G. 1996, 2007. Desire For Society (hardcover). ISBN 0-306-45342-8
