= Beerline Trail =

Trail in Milwaukee County, Wisconsin

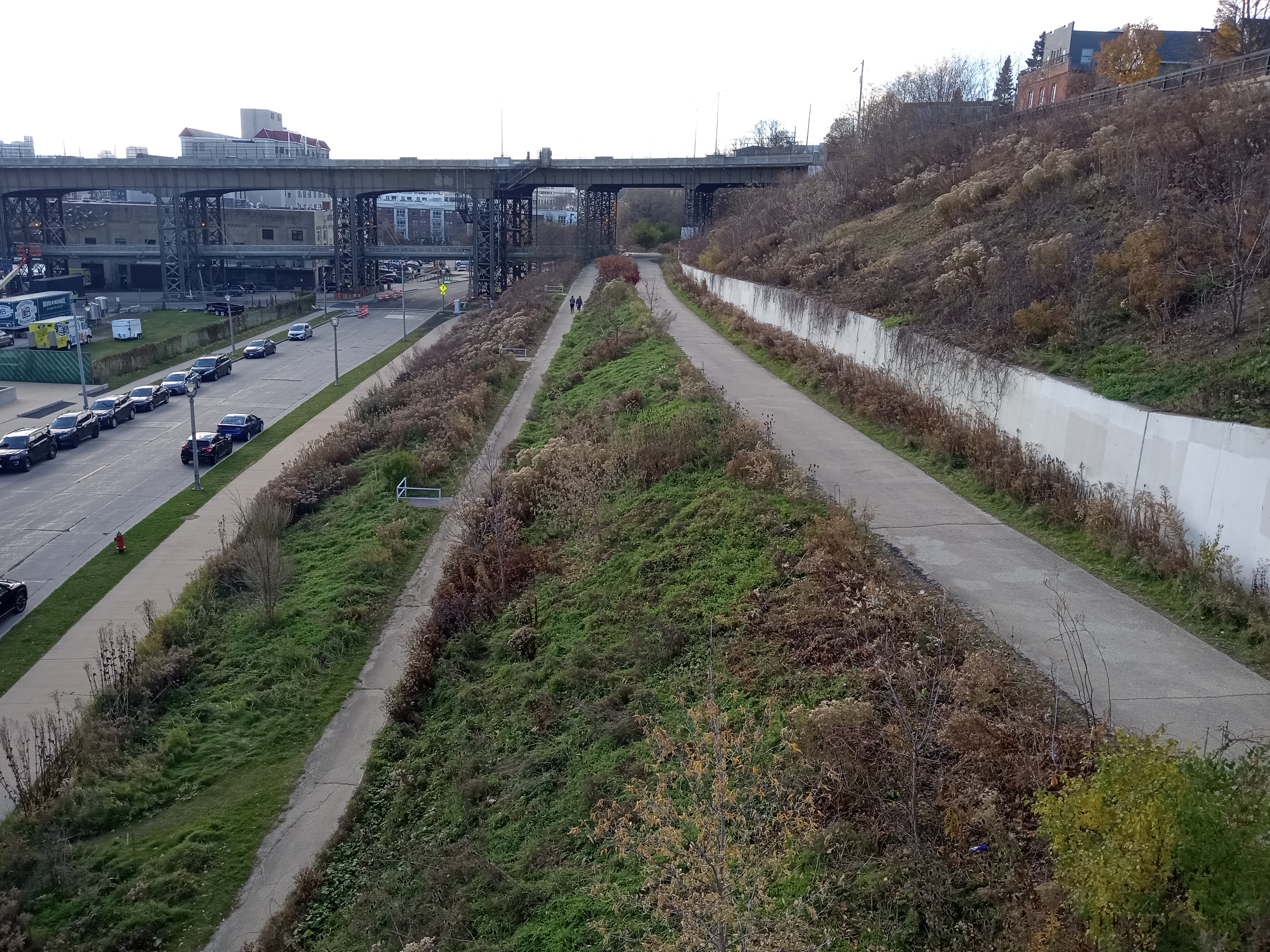
- The Beerline Trail near the intersection of North Commerce Street and North Booth Street, facing west
- Length: 3.7 mi (6.0 km)
- Location: Milwaukee, Wisconsin
- Established: 2007
- Use: Shared-use path
- Maintained by: City of Milwaukee and Milwaukee County
- Website: Beerline Trail

The Beerline Trail is a 3.7-mile (6.0 km) rail trail in Milwaukee, Wisconsin, located near the sites of former breweries. Portions are owned separately by the City of Milwaukee and Milwaukee County.

== History ==
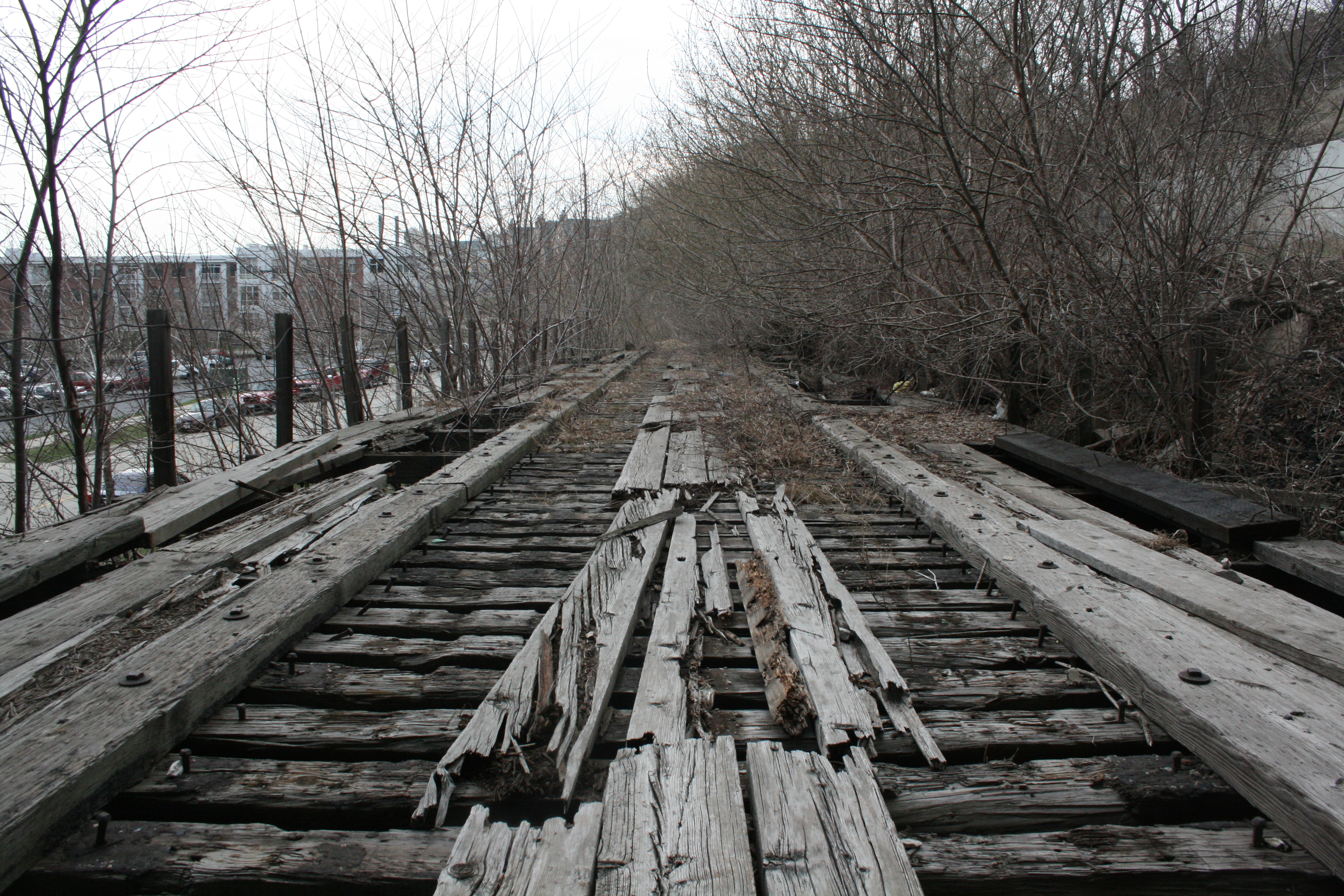
A portion of the abandoned right-of-way in 2008, before conversion into the southern section of the trail

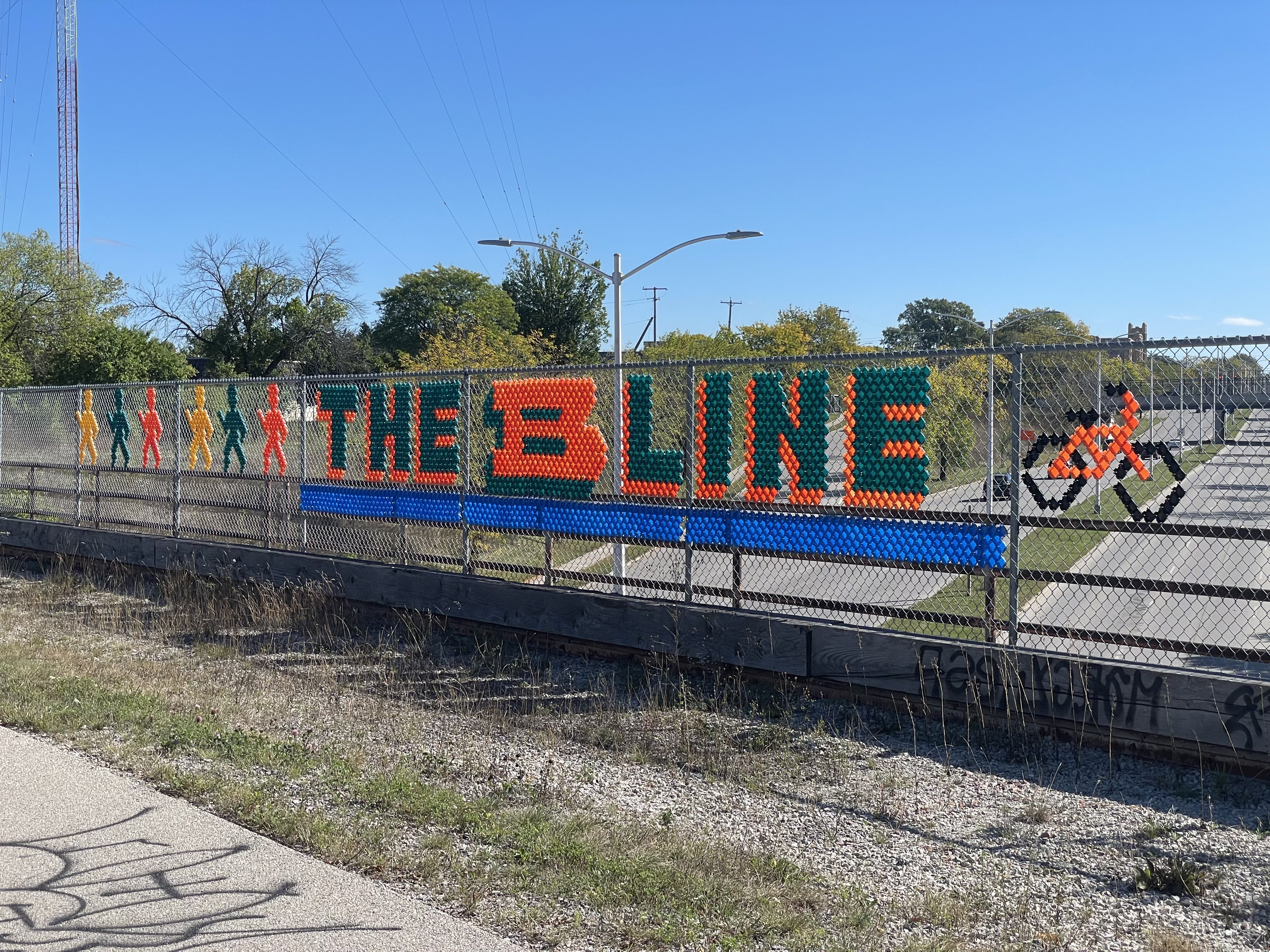
A mirrored picture showing how passing drivers see an art installation at the trail's crossing of Capitol Drive.

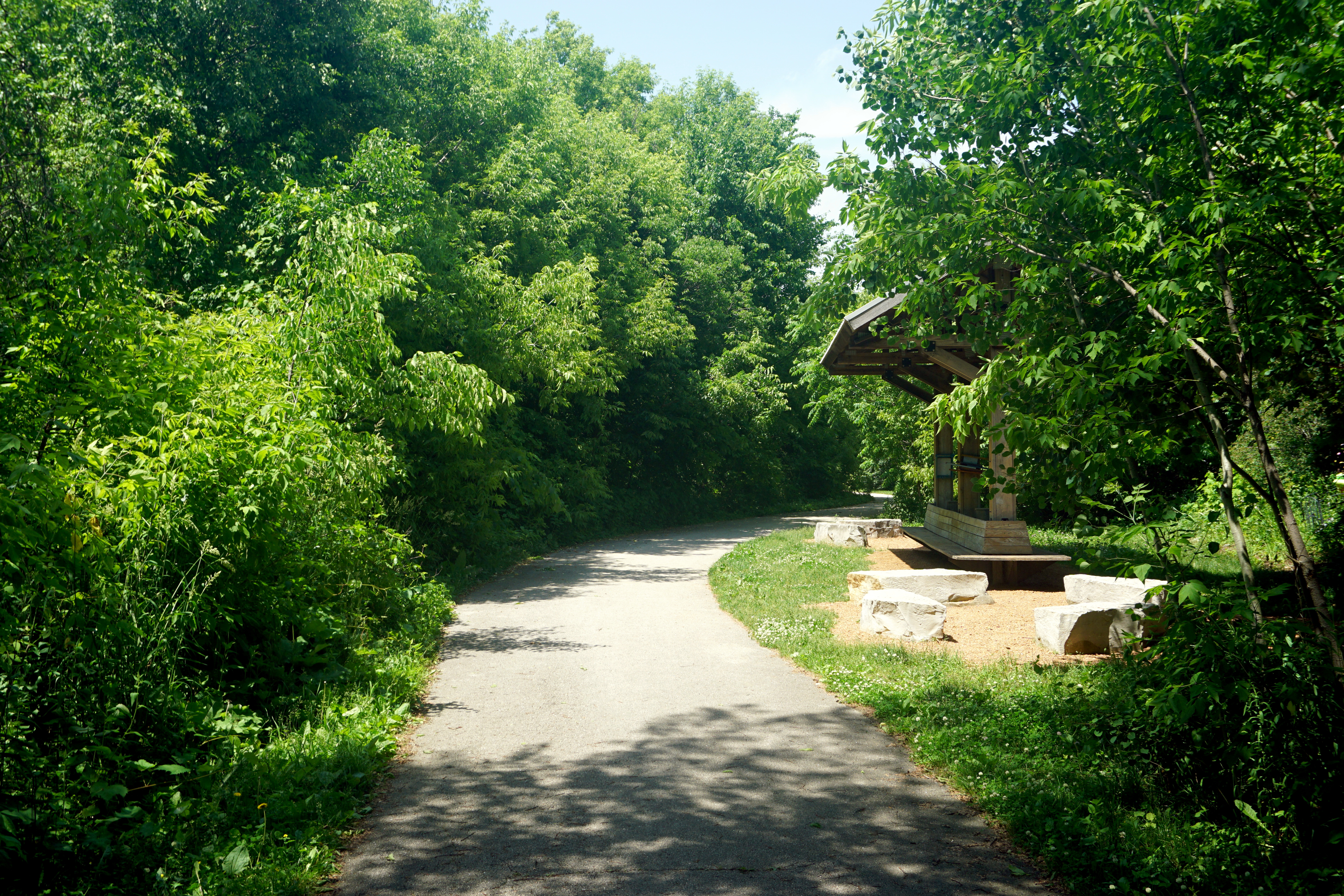
Beerline Trail in June 2025

The railroad formerly occupying the trail area was first built in 1854 by the La Crosse & Milwaukee Railroad Company; by 1858, the railroad stretched to what was then the village of North La Crosse via Portage and New Lisbon. The section in Milwaukee was known as the Chestnut Street line. Through a series of mergers and acquisitions, the railroad became owned by the Milwaukee & St. Paul Railway, later known as the Milwaukee Road. In 1864, a new mainline with a shorter route was built between Milwaukee and Portage via Watertown, and by 1869, the Chestnut Street line had become an industrial branch line.

Major industrial customers on the line included the Schlitz, Blatz, and Pabst breweries, resulting in it being referred to as the Beerline. Traffic on the Beerline included shipments of beer, bottling and distribution materials, coal for power plants, hops, and grain. In this era, the Beerline was 6 miles (9.7 km) long, but in 1975, the Milwaukee Road began to remove portions of the line due to the decline of the breweries and other industrial customers. In the 1990s, the Wisconsin and Southern Railroad purchased what was left of the Beerline, but the remnants were only used for storage.

The trail's first segment, from Bremen Street to Buffum Street, was created in 2007 following the removal of part of the now-abandoned railway. In October 2010, a segment from Riverboat Road to Gordon Park was added as part of an effort to restore green space around the Milwaukee River, connecting the Beerline Trail with the Oak Leaf Trail. The trail was connected with the Milwaukee Riverwalk in 2012. In August 2015, a segment from the intersection of Richards Street and Keefe Avenue to Capitol Drive was added; the area was previously used for dumping waste.

In 2021, planning began for a northwestern extension that would pass underneath Interstate 43.

== Route ==
Starting from its northern terminus at West Capitol Drive (Wisconsin Highway 190), the trail travels southeast and functions as a linear park and community event space. At North Richards Street, the trail becomes discontinuous, alternating between on-street and off-street portions until reaching North Bremen Street, where it temporarily ends. At the northwest corner of Gordon Park, the trail resumes near a connection with the Oak Leaf Trail. It follows the Milwaukee River until reaching the North Humboldt Avenue viaduct, where it then follows the northwestern edge of North Commerce Street until terminating at East Pleasant Street. Access to Kilbourn Reservoir Park and the Marsupial Bridge are provided by a switchback up a hill.

As of 2023, the connection at the Marsupial Bridge sees approximately 154,000 annual users, and the linear park portion near West Capitol Drive sees approximately 32,000.

== See also ==
- Beer in Milwaukee
- Cycling in Milwaukee
