= Oak Leaf Trail =

Trail in Milwaukee County, Wisconsin

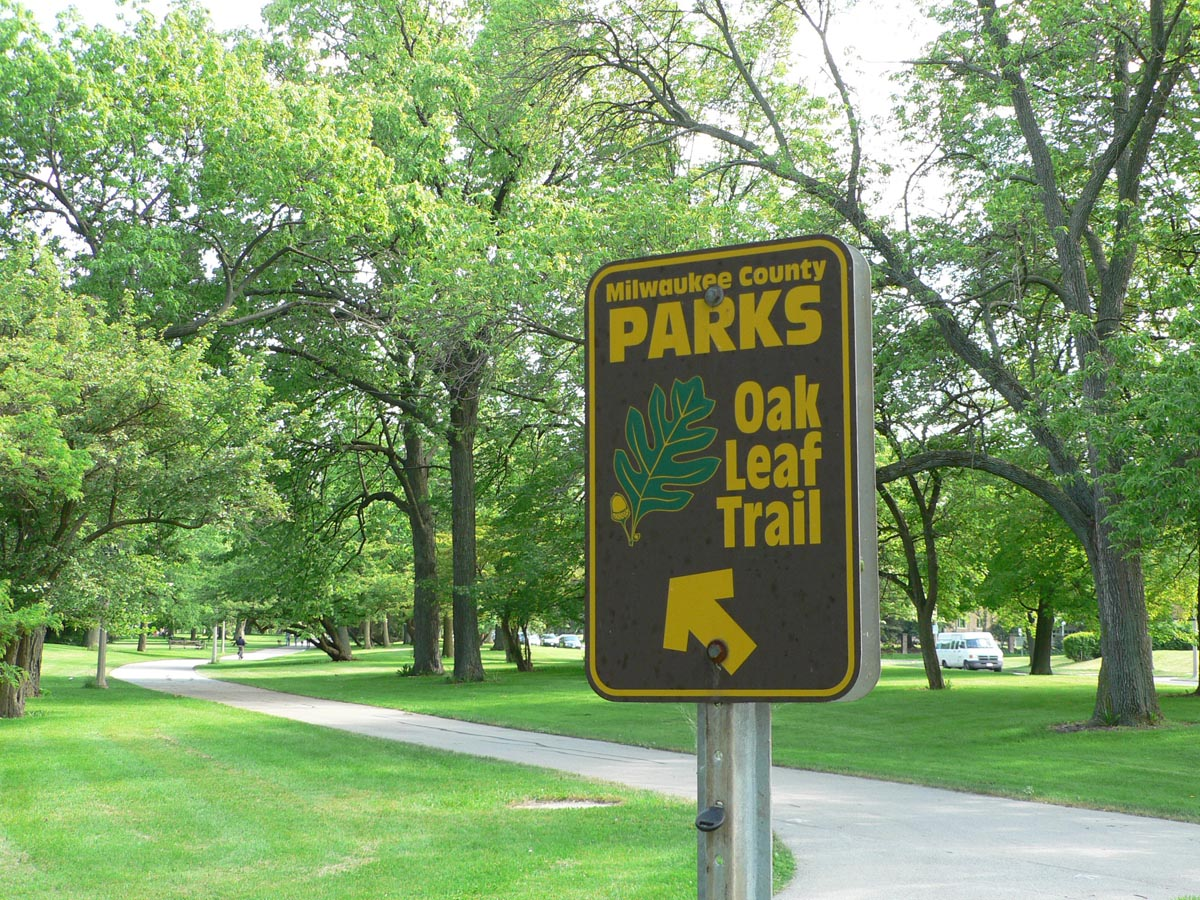
- A sign for the Oak Leaf Trail in Lake Park on Milwaukee's East Side neighborhood
- Length: 135 mi (217 km)
- Location: Milwaukee County, Wisconsin
- Established: 1966
- Use: Shared-use path
- Maintainer: Milwaukee County Parks
- Website: Oak Leaf Trail

The Oak Leaf Trail (formerly 76 Bike Trail) is a mostly paved 135-mile (217 km) multi-use recreational trail system that encircles Milwaukee County, Wisconsin.

Clearly marked trail segments connect all of the major parks in the Milwaukee County Park System.

== History ==
In 1939, early bicycling advocate Harold "Zip" Morgan first conceived and laid out a 64-mile (103 km) trail. The route made its way around the edge of the county and through natural resource corridors found along the rivers and lakefront.

In 1966, three decades later, the trail was officially established by the Milwaukee County Park Commission, and construction of the parkland trails began.

In 1976, the trail became known as the 76 Bike Trail.

In 1995, the trail was briefly renamed to the 76 Multi-Use Trail.

In 1996, the trail was finally renamed to the Oak Leaf Trail.

In 2005, the system of inter-connecting trails consisted of 48 miles (77 km) of asphalt paths and 31 miles (50 km) of parkway, along with 27 miles (43 km) of municipal streets that had designated bicycle lanes and sidewalks.

In September 2018, to improve wayfinding, sections of the trail were assigned colors and branch line names.

== Description ==
The trail system is composed of several intersecting lines. Scenery along the Oak Leaf Trail varies from woodland parks, nature reserves, and a wildlife corridor along the lakefront, to urban industrial settings in Milwaukee's downtown area.

=== Menomonee Line ===
The Menomonee Line is 14.75 miles (23.74 km) long. It stretches from Doyne Park in the south to Dretzka Park in the north.

=== Kinnickinnic Line ===
The Kinnickinnic Line is 15 miles (24 km) long. Following the Kinnickinnic River for most of its length, it turns north at each end to connect to the Milwaukee Art Museum in the east and Hart Park in the west. The Kinnickinnic River Trail intersects with the line at multiple points.

In 1988, the line was originally established as the 76 East-West Trail, spanning 14.3 miles (23.0 km) and following much of the same route that it does today.

In 2021, Milwaukee County Parks received a grant to construct a one-mile (1,600-meter) segment of trail on the line between 16th Street and 27th Street.

=== Root River Line ===
The Root River Line is 19 miles (31 km) long. It stretches from the Milwaukee County Sports Complex in the south to Hoyt Park in the north, connecting with the New Berlin Trail, Brookfield Greenway, Powerline Trail, and Hank Aaron State Trail along the way. Part of this line is included in U.S. Bicycle Route 30.

In 2006, the line was first established as the 2.1-mile (3.4 km) Root River Trail Extension.

=== Oak Creek Line ===
The Oak Creek Line is 8 miles (13 km) long. It branches from the South Shore Line in Abendschein Park in the north, then continues south until bending west to follow part of the Root River.

Portions of the line follow the former Chicago North Shore and Milwaukee Railroad right-of-way.

=== South Shore Line ===
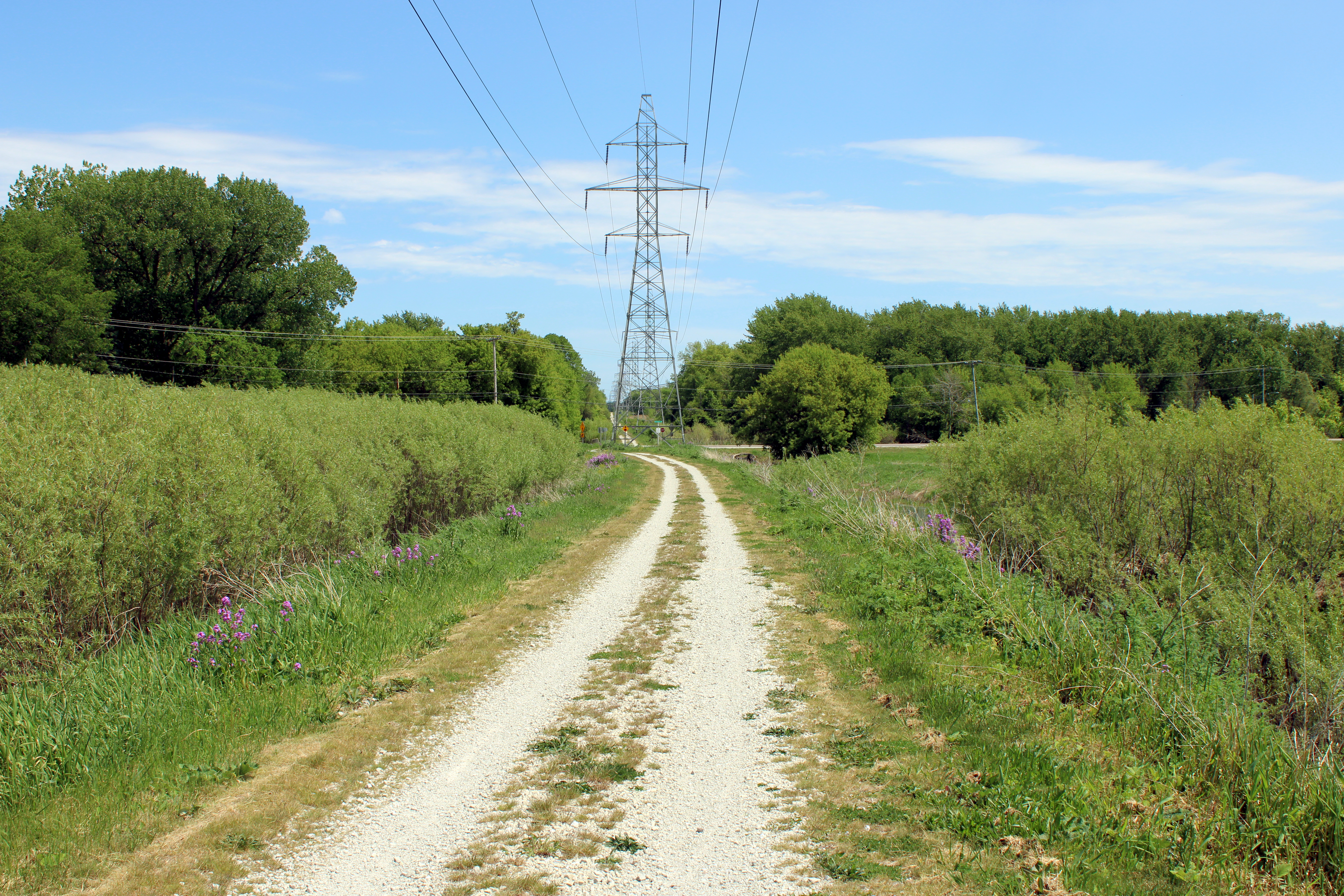
The South Shore Line of the Oak Leaf Trail

The South Shore Line is 16 miles (26 km) long. It stretches from Cupertino Park in the north to Bender Park in the south. It includes sections on the road, separate paved sections, and even a gravel section from Drexel at Abendschein Park south to where it intersects with 5th Avenue in Oak Creek, before turning up 5th Avenue toward Lake Vista Boulevard on the way to Bender Park. The gravel section is expected to eventually be paved, pending completion of a gas main upgrade project.

As of 2024, the line has about 1.4 million users per year.

=== Milwaukee River Line ===
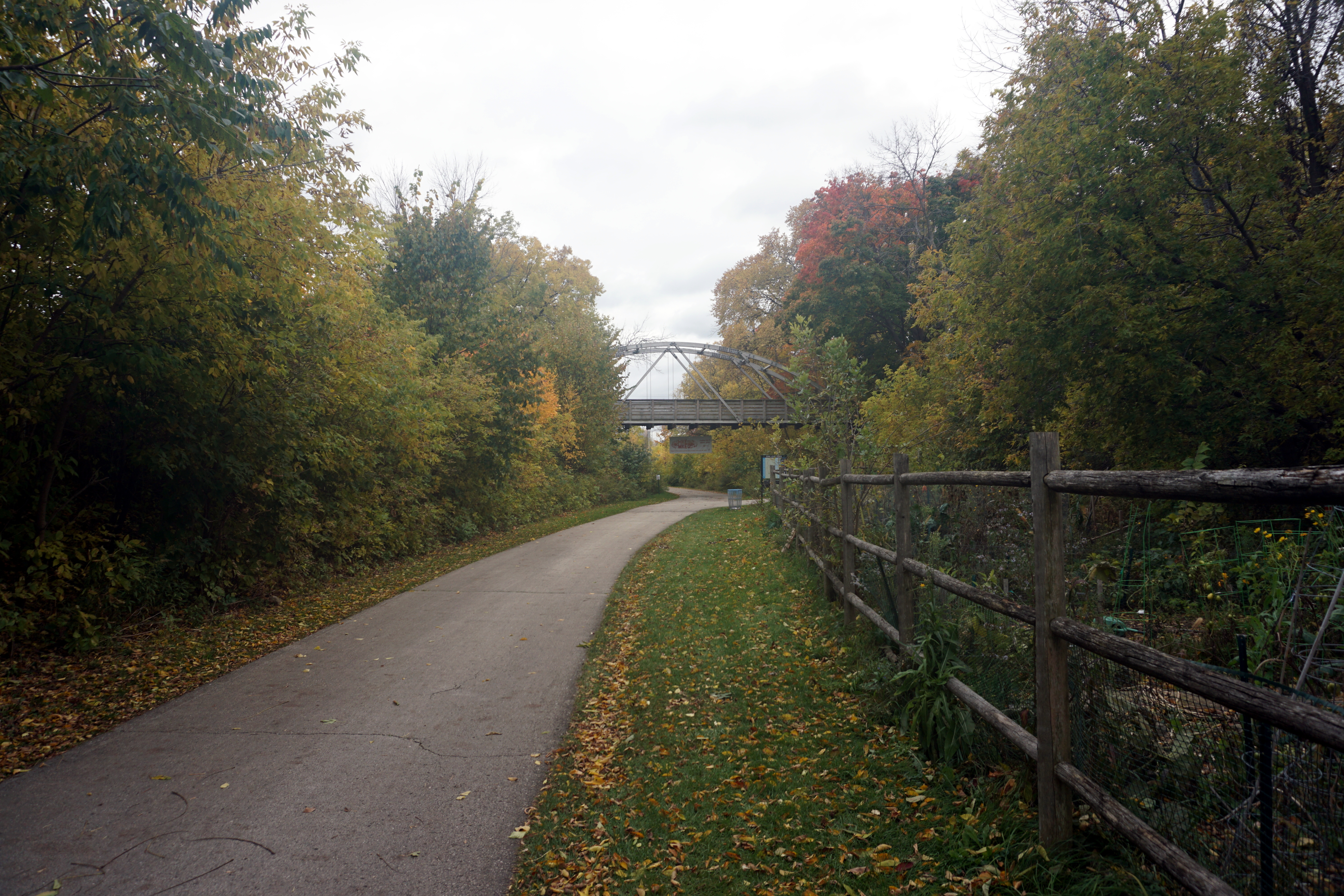
The Milwaukee River Line of the Oak Leaf Trail (October 2022).

The Milwaukee River Line is 14 miles (23 km) long. It stretches from Juneau Park in the south to Brown Deer Park in the north, connecting with the Beerline Trail along the way.

=== The Zip Line ===
The Zip Line is 9 miles (14 km) long. It branches from the Milwaukee River Line in Estabrook Park and continues north until it connects with Kohl Park and the Ozaukee Interurban Trail.

In 2015, a 3.1-mile (5.0 km) gap in the line between Hampton Avenue and Mill Road was filled atop a former Union Pacific right-of-way.

=== Drexel Connector ===
The Drexel Connector is 4.5 miles (7.2 km) long. It provides an east-west connection between the Oak Creek Line and the Root River Line. The western half shares pavement with a major county road, while the eastern half has a separate off-road section that runs through a major shopping district.

=== Bradley Connector ===
The Bradley Connector is 3.3 miles (5.3 km) long. It provides an east-west connection among the Menomonee River Line, the Zip Line, and the Milwaukee River Line.

=== Lake Line ===
The Lake Line is 8 miles (13 km) long. It stretches from the Milwaukee Art Museum in the south to Lake Park in the north.

In 1967, the line was established as a 3.1-mile (5.0 km) bicycle-only pilot trail that started at McKinley Park, traveled north to Lake Park, made a loop, and finally traveled south until ending near the North Point Water Tower.

=== Whitnall Loop ===
The Whitnall Loop is 3.5 miles (5.6 km) long. It branches from the Root River Line to provide a loop route through Whitnall Park.

In 2004, the length was 2.6 miles (4.2 km).

== Gallery ==
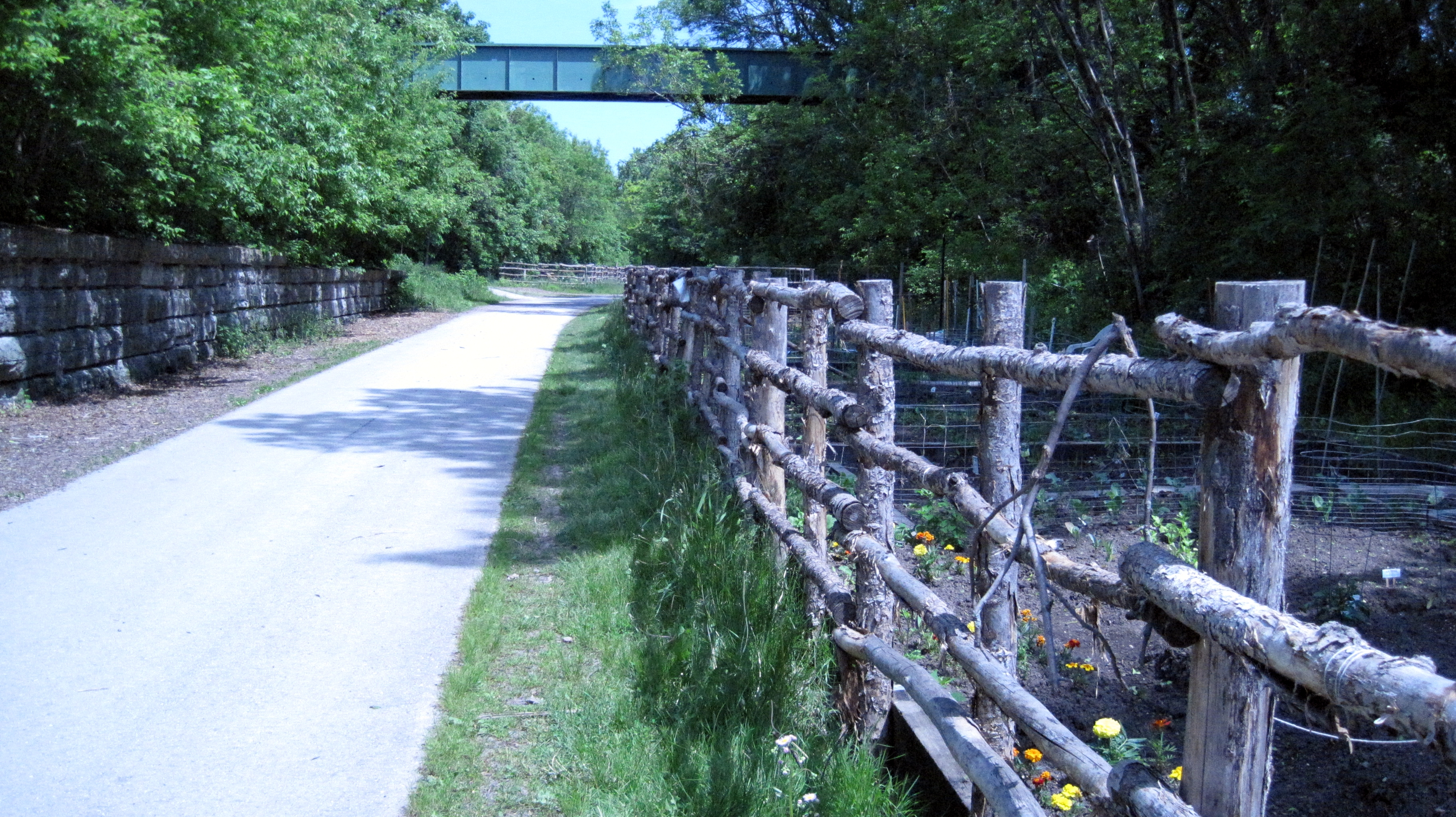
Oak Leaf Trail on the East Side

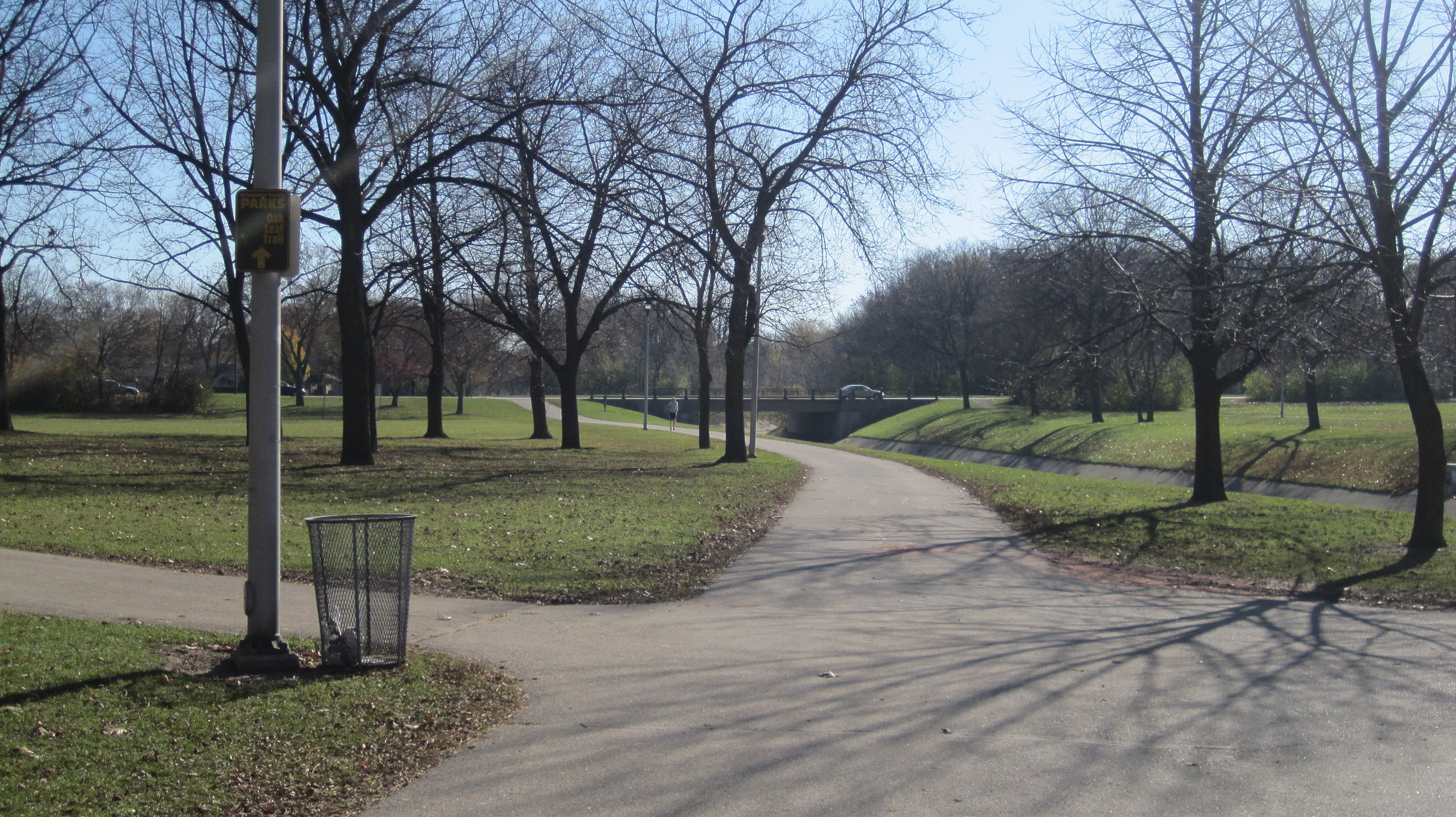
Oak Leaf Trail in McCarty Park

Oak Leaf Trail Bridge in Shorewood

== See also ==
- Parks of Milwaukee
