= Peter Furth =

American academic

Peter G Furth
- Born: Washington, D.C.
- Education: Massachusetts Institute of Technology
- Occupations: Researcher; Professor
- Employer: Northeastern University
- Known for: Cycling advocacy
- Parent: Hans G. Furth (father)
- Website: http://www.northeastern.edu/peter.furth/

Peter G Furth is a researcher and professor at Northeastern University known for his work in transit planning, traffic signals, and bicycle infrastructure. Furth is also considered an expert on Dutch cycling policy and history. He is an advocate for European style cycling infrastructure to be brought to the United States. Furth developed the concept of "Bicycle Priority Lane markings" in 2009 which have since been implemented in several US cities. He also developed the "Level of Traffic Stress" method for categorizing cycling routes, which has been adopted as an organizing concept for some local cycling maps as well as research.

He is opposed to the concept of "vehicular cycling" developed by John Forester and instead supports the implementation of low-stress cycling networks. Furth is also an advocate for increased pedestrian zones in downtown areas.

Furth is the son of Hans G. Furth, a renowned psychology professor.

== Education ==
Furth has a BS, MS and PhD from the Massachusetts Institute of Technology.

== Notable work ==
Furth has authored over 70 publications in the transportation research field. He was a contributing author to the NACTO Urban Bikeway Design Guide. Furth has received the best paper award from the Transportation Research Board twice, once in 1988 and once in 2004.
