= Meyer Fürth =

German writer and teacher

Meyer Elkan Fürth (Hebrew: מאיר בן אלחנן פירדא, romanized: Meir ben Elḥanan Fiurda) was a German writer and teacher, who belonged to the school of the Me'assefim. He annotated a mathematical work by Abraham Joseph Menz that had appeared in Berlin in 1775, and wrote a number of Hebrew and German works.

== Publications ==
- Anfangsgründe der Algebra. Leipzig. 1806–1808.
- Entwurf zur Selbstverständniss eines immerwährenden Kalenders (in German and Yiddish). Dessau: C. Schlieder. 1810.
- Parpera'ot la-ḥokhmah. Dessau: C. Schlieder. 1811. A commentary on the Sefer ibronot, with German translation.
- Shelemut ve-tsurat ha-nefesh. Dessau: C. Schlieder. 1810. Moses Mendelssohn's Phädon, with a commentary in refutation of Mendelssohn's views.
- Kevod Elohim. Dessau. 1812. A polemic against the Reform movement.
- Gründliches Rechenbuch für die Jugend, besonders aber zum Gebrauche derjenigen, die Kaufleute oder Banquiers werden wollen. Vol. 1. Leipzig: Carl Cnobloch. 1816.
- Gründliches Rechenbuch für die Jugend, besonders aber zum Gebrauche derjenigen, die Kaufleute oder Banquiers werden wollen. Vol. 2. Leipzig: Carl Cnobloch. 1816.
- Dibre yosher. Dessau. 1818. A polemic against Joseph Wolf and Gotthold Salomon's book Der Charakter des Judenthums, and against the latter's Selimas Stunden der Weihe, in Judæo-German.
- Freimüthige Gedanken. Dessau. 1818. A portion of the preceding work in German.
- Yir'at shamayim. Dessau. 1820–1821. A commentary to Maimonides' Hilkhot kiddush ha-ḥodesh, together with Scriptural comments and novellæ.
