= Great River Trail =

Rail trail in Wisconsin, United States

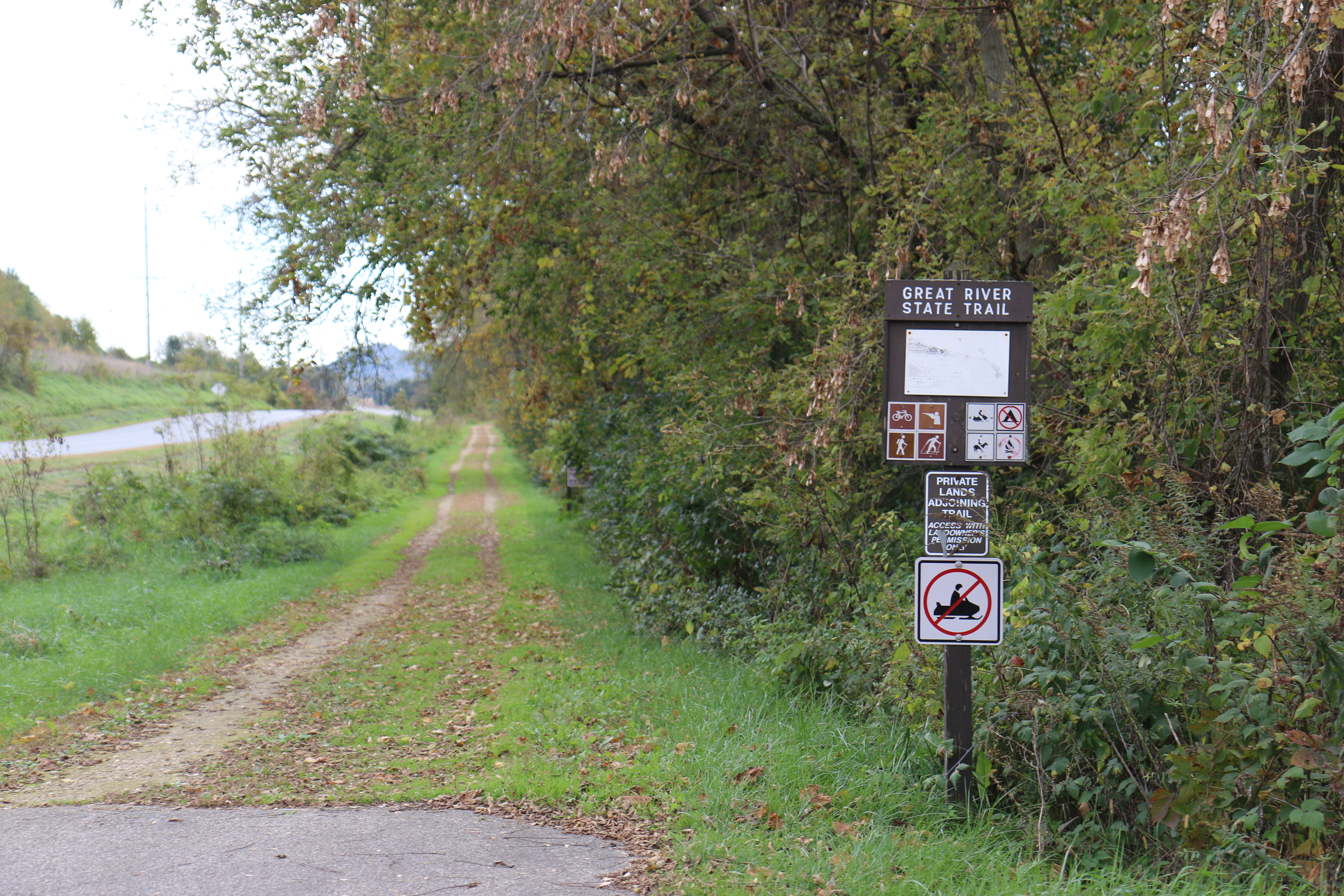
The Great River State Trail at the entrance to the Trempealeau National Wildlife Refuge

The Great River State Trail is a 24-mile (39 km) rail trail between Onalaska and Marshland, Wisconsin. It is designed for foot, bicycle, equestrian or light motorized traffic. It is designated as a multiuse trail, offering recreational access to the routes, and is open to the public.

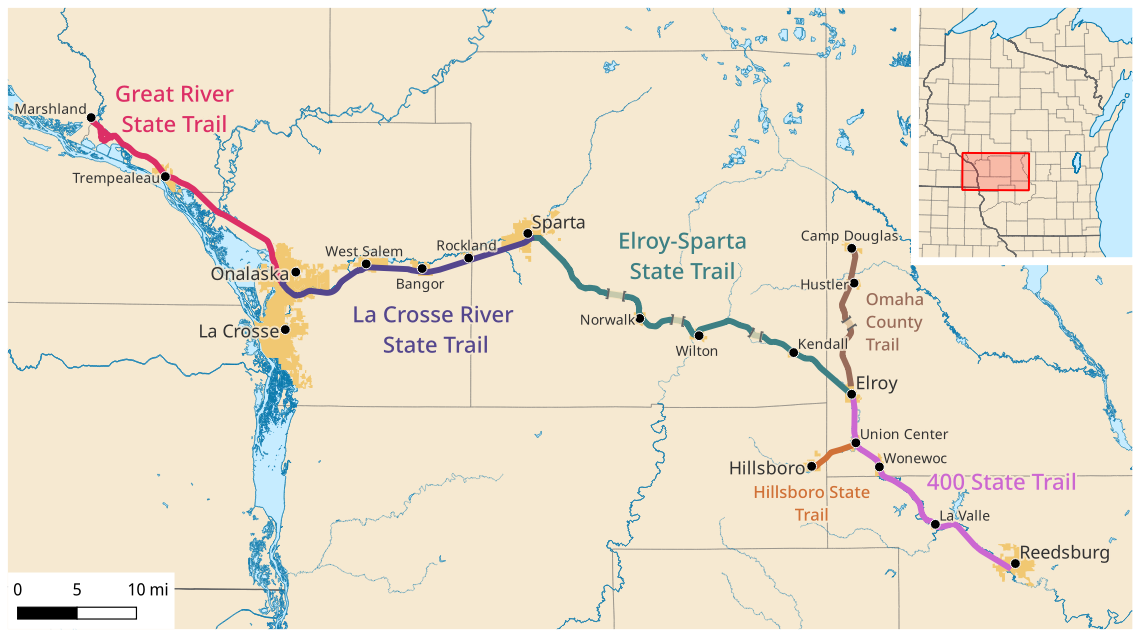
Map of the Great River Trail and connecting trails

It is one of four connecting bike trails in west-central Wisconsin that spans approximately one-third of the state. The trail gets its name for running along the Mississippi River, hence "Great River" State Trail. It is part of the larger Wisconsin bike trail system, operated by the state of Wisconsin.

The four connecting west central Wisconsin trails, known as the Bike 4 Trails, going from southeast to northwest are:

- the 400 State Trail (22 mi or 35 km)
- the Elroy-Sparta State Trail (32 mi or 51 km)
- the La Crosse River Trail (22 mi or 35 km)
- the Great River State Trail (24 mi or 39 km)

The north end of the trail is on Refuge Rd. at the intersection of West Prairie Rd., southeast of Marshland (44°03′10″N 91°30′56″W). The south end is at the intersection with the La Crosse River Trail at a parking lot off of County Highway B east of WIS 16 in Medary at the former Winona Junction.(43°51′35″N 91°12′06″W).

The trail headquarters is located in Onalaska and is open from May 1 through October 31. There is a $5.00 per day fee for use of the trail if one does not have the $25.00 yearly Wisconsin bike trail pass. Camping, lodging, food, parking, bike rentals and information are available at many points along the trail.

The trail is constructed upon the abandoned Chicago and North Western Railway railroad bed. The La Crosse, Trempealeau & Prescott Railroad chartered to build from a point across the river from Winona to connect with the Chicago, Milwaukee and St. Paul railroad at Winona Junction in Wisconsin near La Crosse. This was completed in 1870 with tracks in Marshland. It features 18 bridges that cross over streams feeding into the Mississippi River. It provides visitors with easy access to the Nicholls Hopewell Mound, the Perrot State Park, and the Trempealeau National Wildlife Refuge. The Great River State Trail passes through the Mississippi Flyway and is frequented by bird watchers. Many wildlife species can be observed from the trail as it passes through beautiful natural regions, such as bottomland hardwood forests and Wisconsin's Driftless areas. Some examples of the trademark Wisconsin species observed by visitors include great blue herons, egrets, and white-tailed deer.

== See also ==
- List of rail trails
- List of hiking trails in Wisconsin
