= Medary =

Medary may refer to:

== Places ==
United States

- Medary, Wisconsin, a town
  - Medary (community), Wisconsin, an unincorporated community
- Medary, South Dakota, an unincorporated community

== People with the surname ==
- Milton Bennett Medary, American architect
- Samuel Medary, American politician

== See also ==
- Medaryville, Indiana, a town
