= Upper Mississippi River National Wildlife and Fish Refuge =

National wildlife refuge in Minnesota, United States

- IUCN category IV (habitat/species management area)
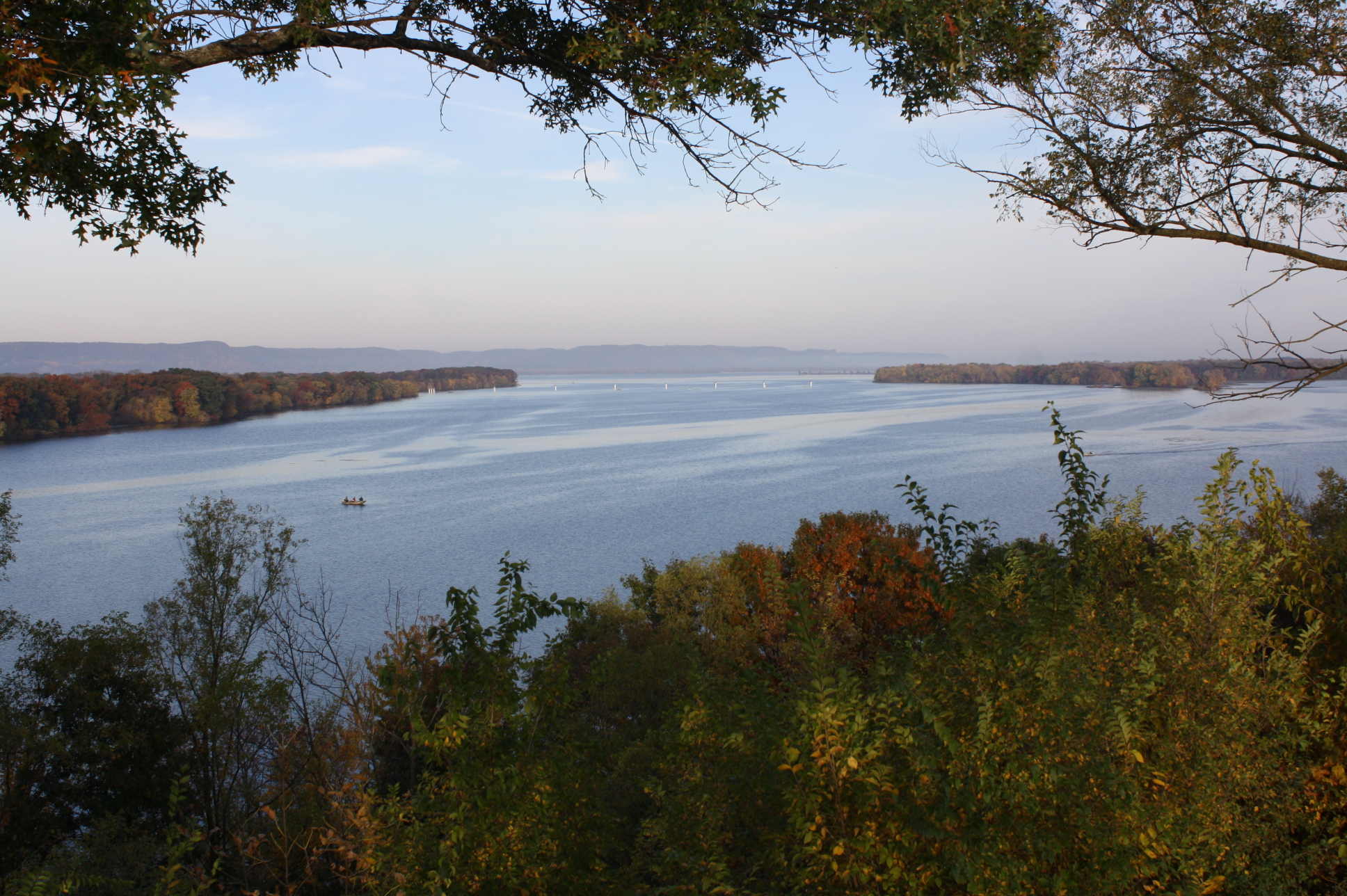
- Looking west over the Mississippi River from an overlook within the Upper Mississippi River National Wildlife and Fish Refuge

- Location within the United States
- Location: Illinois, Iowa, Minnesota, Wisconsin, United States
- Nearest city: Dubuque, Iowa
- Coordinates: 42°53′00″N 91°06′00″W
- Area: 240,000 acres (970 km^{2})
- Established: 1924
- Governing body: U.S. Fish and Wildlife Service
- Website: Upper Mississippi River National Wildlife and Fish Refuge

Ramsar Wetland
- Official name: Upper Mississippi River Floodplain Wetlands
- Designated: 1 May 2010
- Reference no.: 1901

The Upper Mississippi River National Wildlife and Fish Refuge is a 240,000-acre (970 km^{2}), 261-mile-long (420 km) National Wildlife Refuge located in and along the Upper Mississippi River. It runs from Wabasha, Minnesota, in the north to Rock Island, Illinois, in the south.

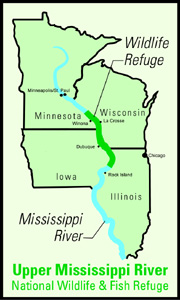
(United States Fish and Wildlife Service)

In its northern portion, it is in the Driftless Area, a region of North America that remained free from ice during the last ice age. Certain parcels contained within the refuge were later transferred to the Driftless Area National Wildlife Refuge.

The refuge is an important element of the Mississippi Flyway. It has many wooded islands, sloughs, and hardwood forests. The wildlife found here include the canvasback duck, tundra swan, white-tailed deer, and muskrat. Recreational activities include boating, hunting, fishing, and swimming.

Refuge Headquarters are located in Winona, Minnesota, with district offices located in La Crosse, Wisconsin, Prairie du Chien, Wisconsin, and Thomson, Illinois.

== Geography ==
The refuge is one of only two that spans portions of four states (the other is Silvio O. Conte National Fish and Wildlife Refuge). As of 30 September 2007 the area per state was: Wisconsin: 89,637.54 acres (362.75 km^{2}), Iowa: 51,147.78 acres (206.99 km^{2}), Minnesota: 33,868.64 acres (137.06 km^{2}), Illinois: 33,489.57 acres (135.53 km^{2}).

The area is only separated from the Trempealeau National Wildlife Refuge by a railroad line. The protected areas White Dam Wildlife Area, Thorpe Wildlife Management Area, Goose Island County Park, Dorer State Forest, Perrot State Park, Van Loon Wildlife Area, Great River Bluffs State Park, Pool Slough Wildlife Management Area, Blackhawk Point Wildlife Management Area, Fish Farm Mounds Wildlife Management Area, Lansing Wildlife Management Area, Rush Creek Natural Area, Effigy Mounds National Monument and Driftless Area National Wildlife Refuge also border the Refuge directly or only from roads.

The following counties border on or have land within the Upper Mississippi River National Wildlife and Fish Refuge. In each state, the counties are listed from north to south. The lakes and rivers within the refuge area of each county are also listed.

=== Minnesota ===
- Wabasha County
  - Cross Lake
  - Half Moon Lake
  - Maloney Lake
  - McCarthy Lake
  - Peterson Lake
  - Robinson Lake
  - Zumbro River
- Winona County
- Houston County
  - Blue Lake
  - Hayshore Lake
  - Lawrence Lake
  - Root River
  - Target Lake

=== Wisconsin ===
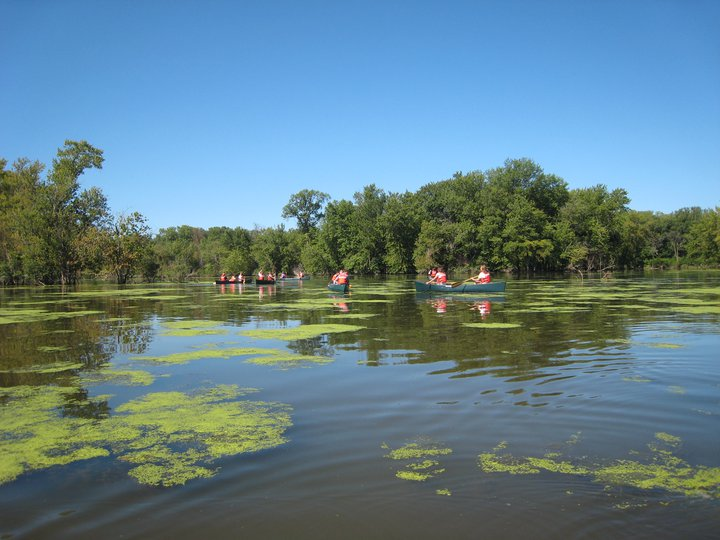
Paddling the Mississippi River

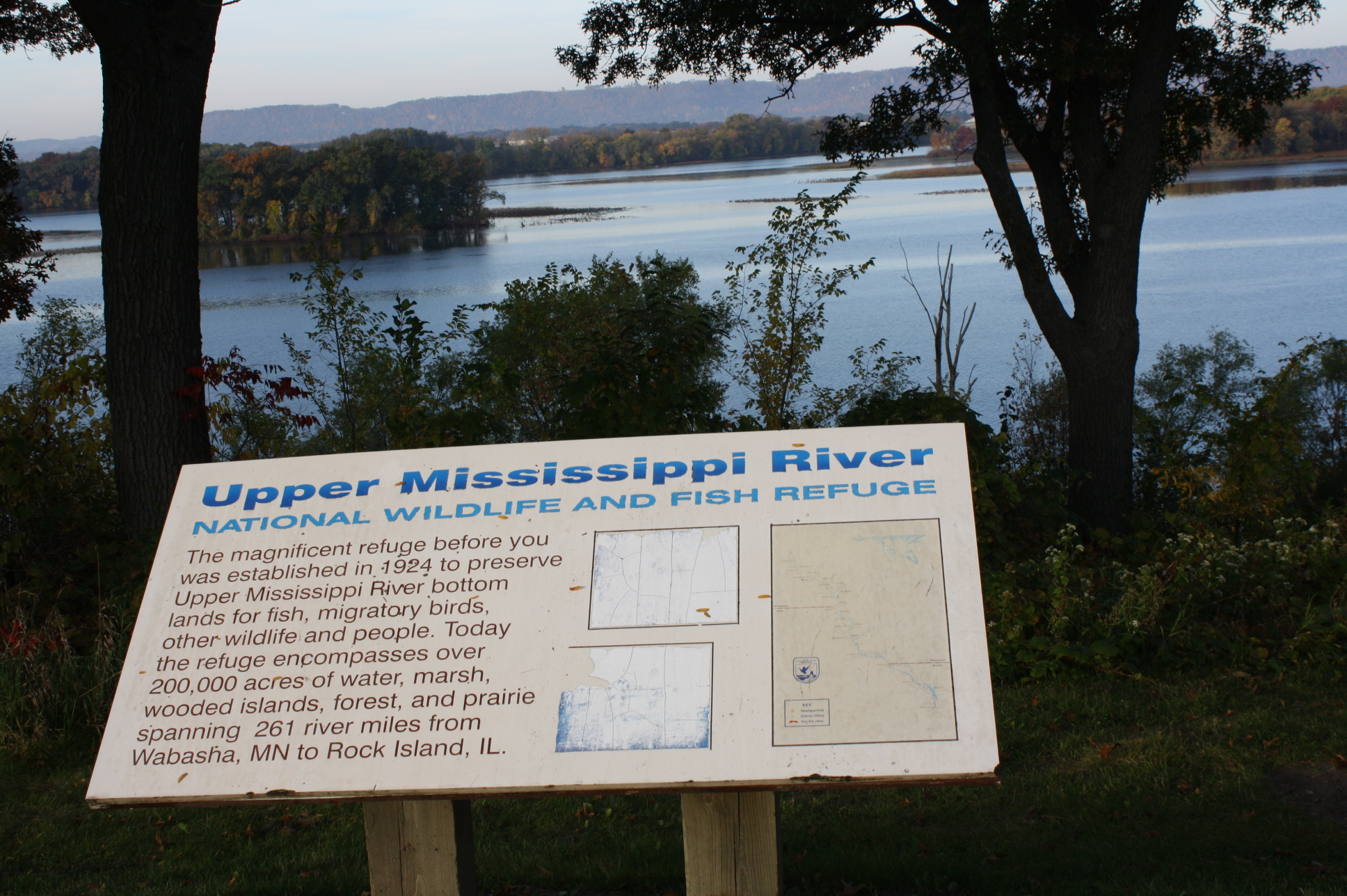
Sign

- Buffalo County
- Trempealeau County
- La Crosse County
- Vernon County
- Crawford County
- Grant County

=== Iowa ===
- Allamakee County
- Clayton County
- Dubuque County
- Jackson County
- Clinton County
- Scott County

=== Illinois ===
- Jo Daviess County
- Carroll County
- Whiteside County
- Rock Island County

== Cardinal-Hickory Creek high-voltage transmission line ==
An editorial in The Washington Post on April 6, 2024, discusses the challenges faced by clean energy projects caused by environmental activists in lawsuits. An example is the Cardinal-Hickory Creek high-voltage transmission line between Iowa and Wisconsin. It would connect over 160 renewable energy facilities producing 25 gigawatts of green power. It is facing a temporary halt due to a lawsuit by environmental groups condemning its impact on the Upper Mississippi River National Wildlife and Fish Refuge. The editorial argues this is just one example of the conflicts between environmental protection and the need for new infrastructure to support the clean energy transition.

== See also ==
- Izaak Walton League
- List of National Wildlife Refuges
- Trempealeau National Wildlife Refuge
- Upper Mississippi River Locks and Dams
