= Marshland, Wisconsin =

- Unincorporated community
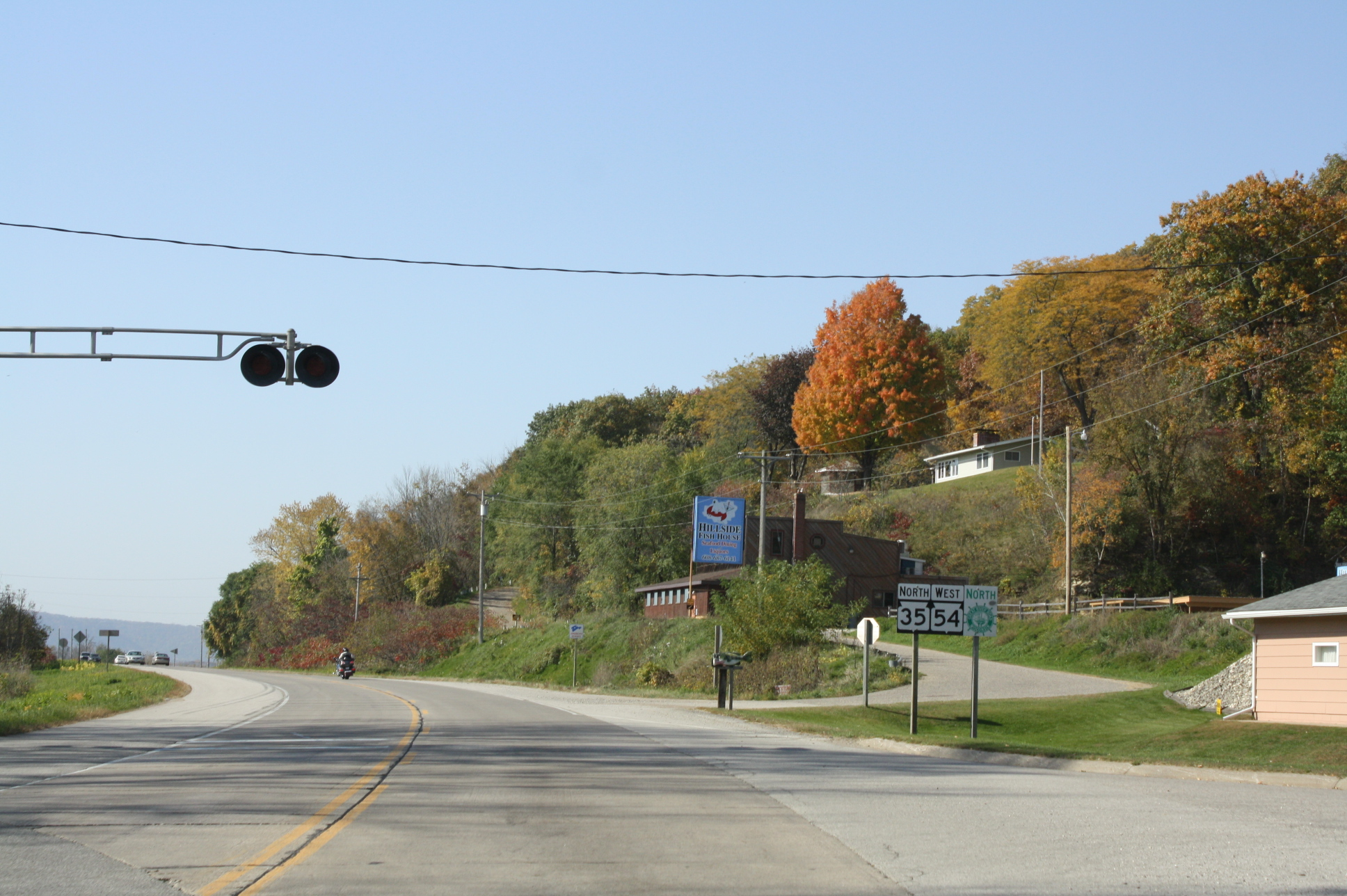
- Downtown Marshland

- Location within Wisconsin Location within the United States
- Coordinates: 44°04′25″N 91°33′18″W
- Country: United States
- State: Wisconsin
- County: Buffalo
- Town: Buffalo
- Elevation: 682 ft (208 m)
- Time zone: UTC-6 (Central (CST))
  - Summer (DST): UTC-5 (CDT)
- Area codes: 715 & 534
- GNIS feature ID: 1569087

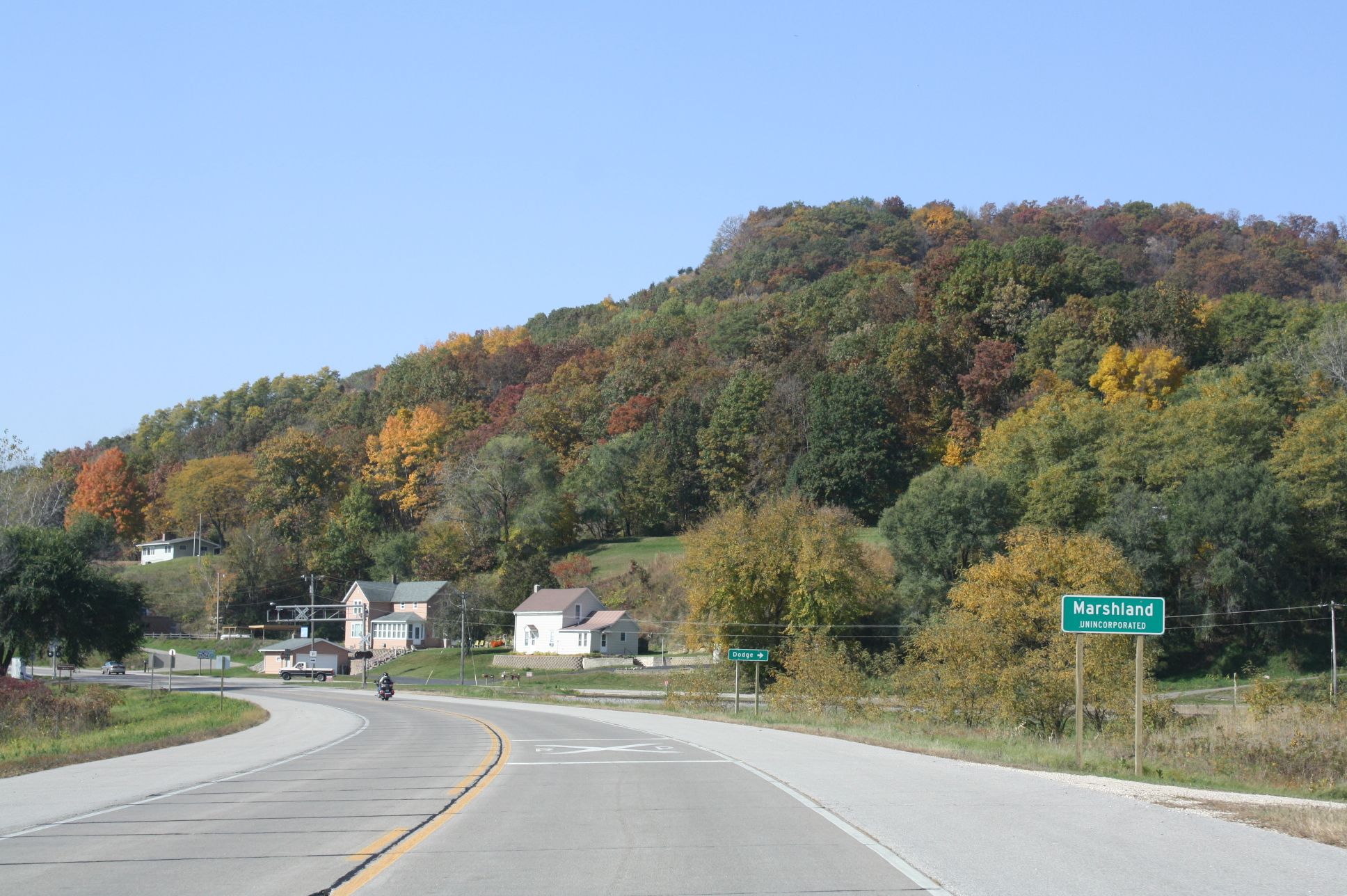
Marshland sign on Wisconsin Highway 54.

Marshland is an unincorporated community located in the town of Buffalo, in Buffalo County, Wisconsin, United States. Marshland is located on Wisconsin highways 35 and 54, 8.5 miles (13.7 km) east-southeast of Fountain City.

== History ==
The La Crosse, Trempealeau & Prescott Railroad was chartered to build from a point across the river from Winona to connect with the Chicago, Milwaukee and St. Paul Railroad at Winona Junction in Wisconsin near La Crosse. This line was completed in 1870, with tracks passing through Marshland.

In 1873, the Green Bay & Minnesota Railroad laid tracks from Merrillian Junction to join with the La Crosse, Trempealeau, & Prescott Railroad at Marshland. That railroad was built to reach Winona, Minnesota and the Winona and St. Peter Railroad. It later became part of the Green Bay and Western Railroad.

A post office called Marshland was established in 1875, and remained in operation until it was discontinued in 1904. The community was named because the surrounding farmland was once a marsh.

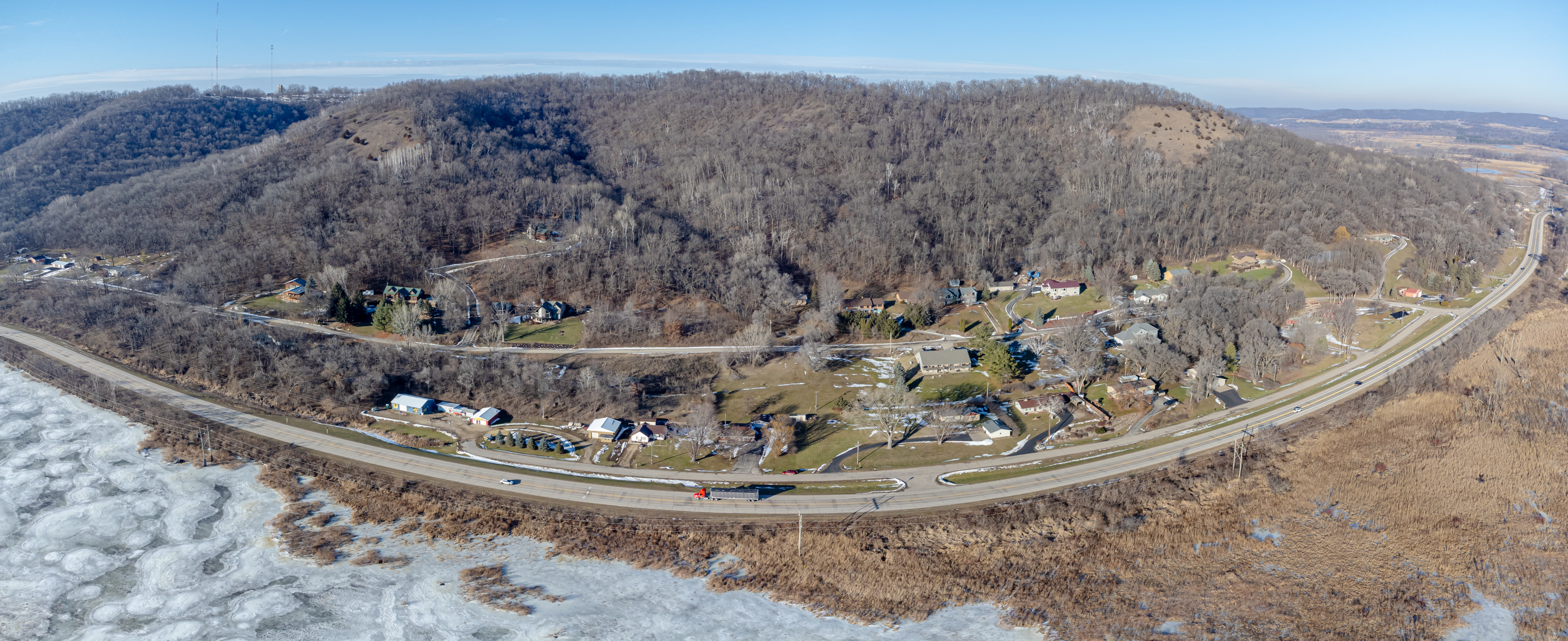
