= Medary, Wisconsin =

- Town
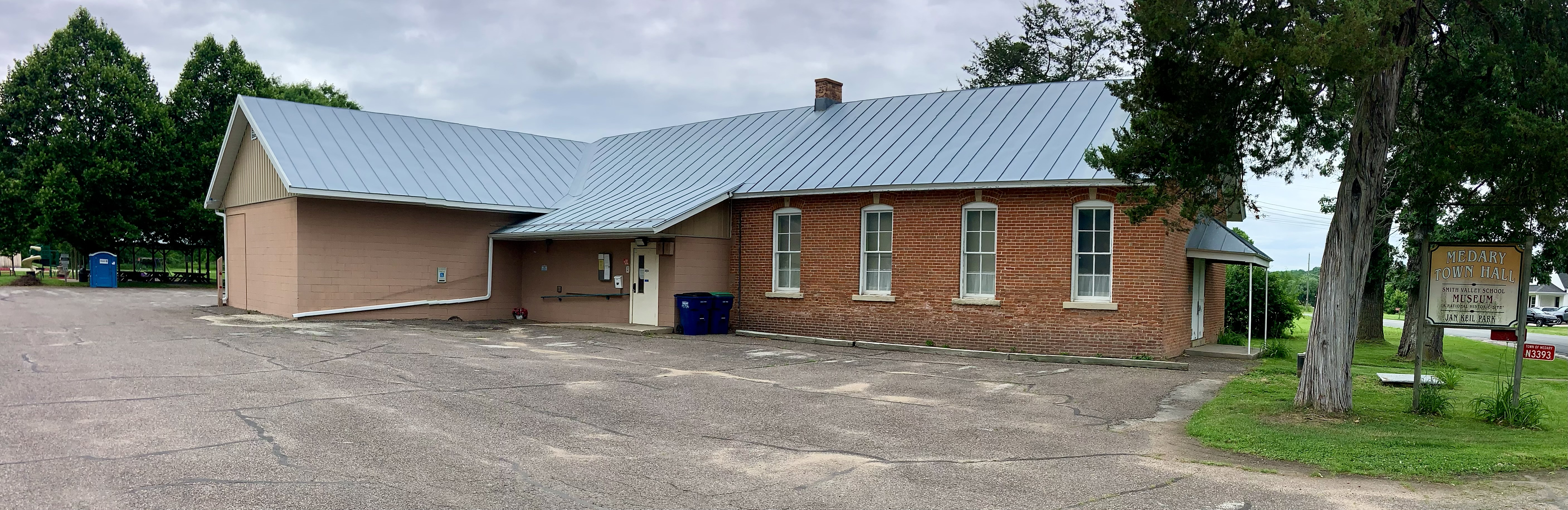
- Medary Town Hall

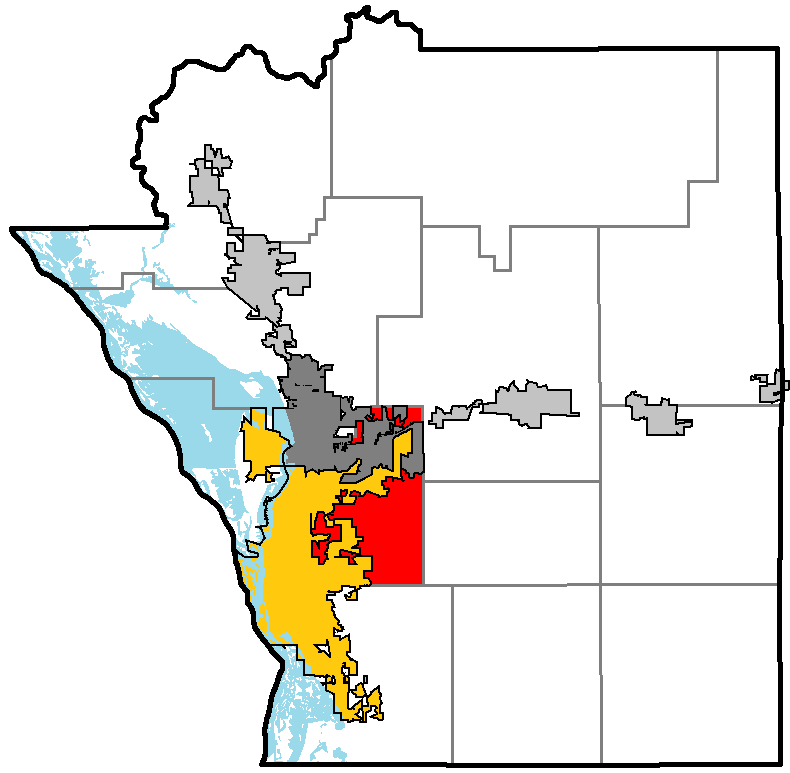
- Location of Medary, La Crosse County

- Location of La Crosse County, Wisconsin
- Coordinates: 43°50′38″N 91°10′36″W
- Country: United States
- State: Wisconsin
- County: La Crosse

Area
  - Total: 11.7 sq mi (30.4 km^{2})
  - Land: 11.7 sq mi (30.3 km^{2})
  - Water: 0 sq mi (0.0 km^{2})
- Elevation: 725 ft (221 m)

Population (2020)
  - Total: 1,604
  - Density: 137/sq mi (52.9/km^{2})
- Time zone: UTC-6 (Central (CST))
  - Summer (DST): UTC-5 (CDT)
- Area code: 608
- FIPS code: 55-50400
- GNIS feature ID: 1583682
- Website: https://townofmedary.com

Medary (/məˈdɛəri/ mə-DAIR-ee) is a town in La Crosse County, Wisconsin, United States. The population was 1,604 at the 2020 census. It is part of the La Crosse, Wisconsin Metropolitan Statistical Area. The unincorporated community of Medary (formerly known as Winona Junction) is located in the town.

== Geography ==
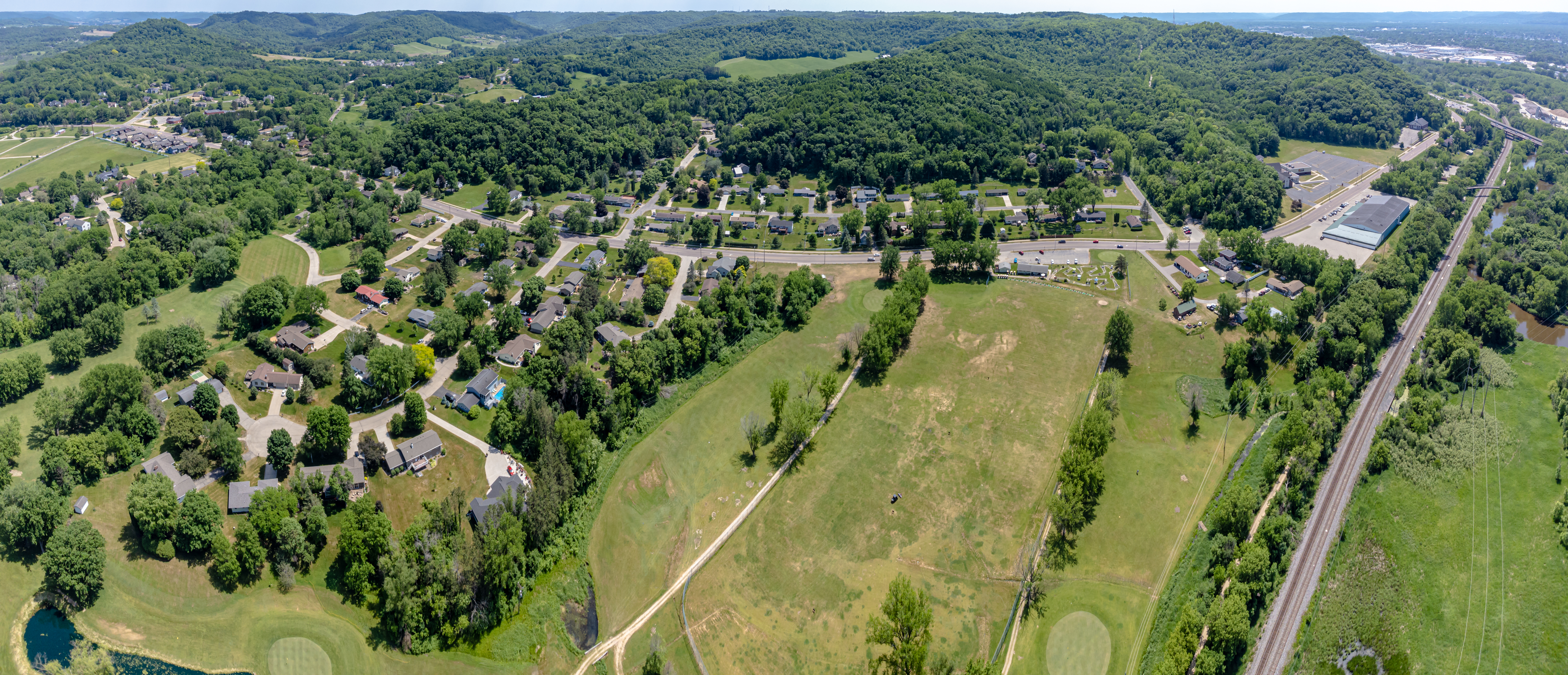

According to the United States Census Bureau, the town has a total area of 11.7 square miles (30.4 km^{2}), of which 11.7 square miles (30.3 km^{2}) is land and 0.04 square mile (0.1 km^{2}) (0.17%) is water.

== Demographics ==
Historical population
Year	Pop.	±%
1980	2,333	—
1990	1,794	−23.1%
2000	1,463	−18.5%
2010	1,461	−0.1%
2014 (est.)	1,439	−1.5%

As of the census of 2000, there were 1,463 people, 530 households, and 405 families residing in the town. The population density was 124.9 people per square mile (48.2/km^{2}). There were 553 housing units at an average density of 47.2 per square mile (18.2/km^{2}). The racial makeup of the town was 98.29% White, 0.14% African American, 0.48% Asian, 0.14% from other races, and 0.96% from two or more races. Hispanic or Latino of any race were 0.41% of the population.

There were 530 households, out of which 37.5% had children under the age of 18 living with them, 68.5% were married couples living together, 4.3% had a female householder with no husband present, and 23.4% were non-families. 17.4% of all households were made up of individuals, and 3.4% had someone living alone who was 65 years of age or older. The average household size was 2.76 and the average family size was 3.14.

In the town, the population was spread out, with 27.9% under the age of 18, 7.0% from 18 to 24, 27.3% from 25 to 44, 30.3% from 45 to 64, and 7.5% who were 65 years of age or older. The median age was 39 years. For every 100 females, there were 104.3 males. For every 100 females age 18 and over, there were 105.3 males.

The median income for a household in the town was $57,431, and the median income for a family was $65,469. Males had a median income of $40,988 versus $31,250 for females. The per capita income for the town was $25,395. About 1.0% of families and 3.6% of the population were below the poverty line, including 4.1% of those under age 18 and none of those age 65 or over.

== See also ==
- Medary (community), Wisconsin
