= Trempealeau National Wildlife Refuge =

Wildlife preserve in Wisconsin, US

- IUCN category IV (habitat/species management area)
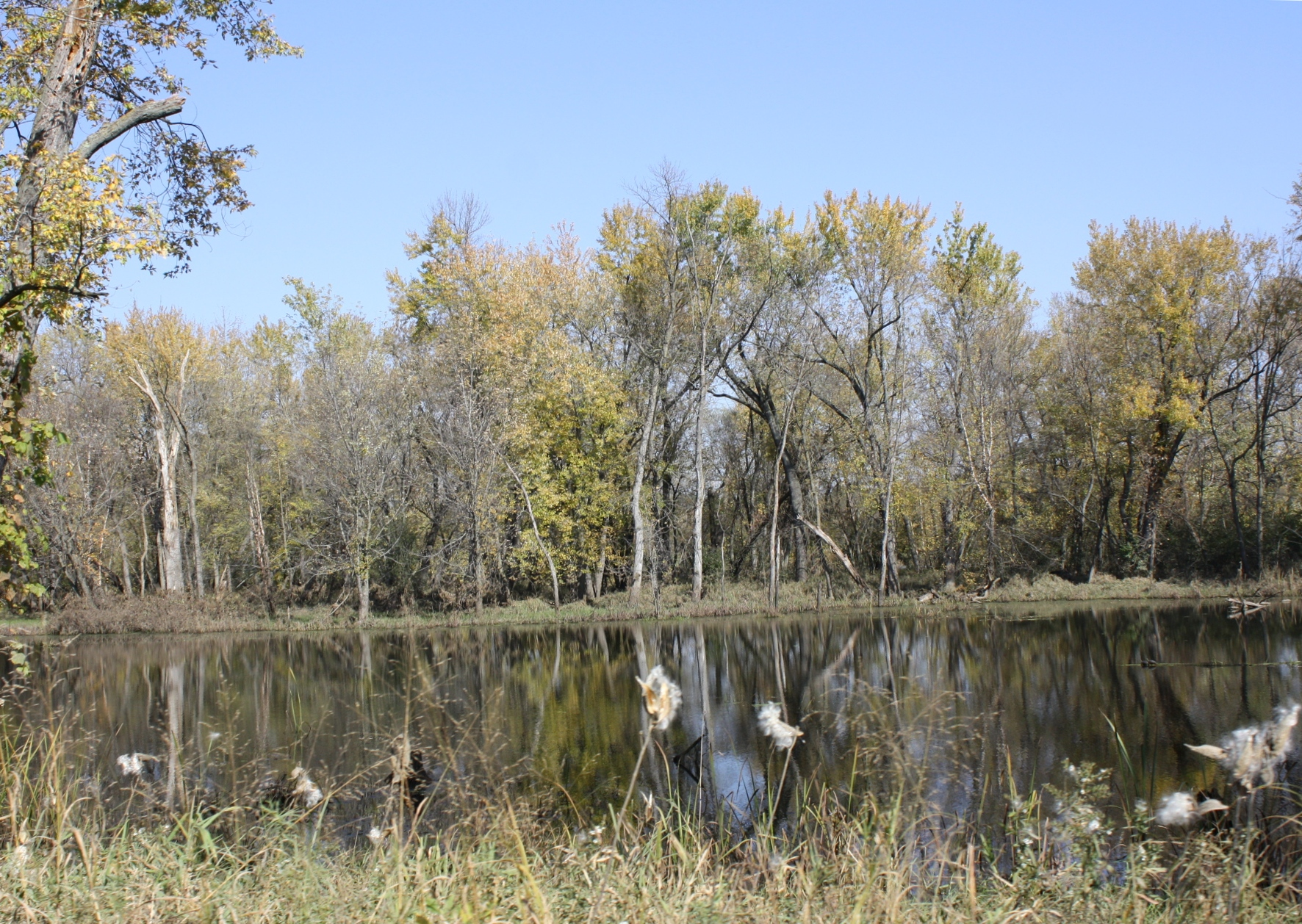

- Location within Wisconsin Location within the United States
- Location: Buffalo, Trempealeau counties, Wisconsin, United States
- Nearest city: Winona, Minnesota
- Coordinates: 44°03′00″N 91°34′00″W
- Area: 6,808 acres (27.55 km^{2})
- Established: 1936
- Governing body: U.S. Fish and Wildlife Service
- Website: Trempealeau National Wildlife Refuge

Trempealeau National Wildlife Refuge is a 6,808-acre (27.55 km^{2}) National Wildlife Refuge located along the Upper Mississippi River in extreme southern Buffalo County and extreme southwestern Trempealeau County in Wisconsin, United States. There are two small private areas in the protected area.

It is in part a wetland consisting of backwaters away from the Mississippi and Trempealeau River, and is a significant element of the Mississippi Flyway. It is part of the Driftless Area, a portion of North America which remained free of ice during the last ice age, creating in part the deep gorge of the Mississippi, quite visible from this refuge.

It is also a sand prairie, including grasses such as big bluestem, indiangrass, and switchgrass capable of growing to eight to nine feet (2.4 to 2.7 m) in height.

There is also bottomland forest in the reserve with river birch, swamp white oak and silver maple.

The area is only separated from the Upper Mississippi River National Wildlife and Fish Refuge by a railroad line. The Perrot State Park borders on the south.

The Trempealeau National Wildlife Refuge was recently extended by about 800 acre along the Trempealeau River.

The North American river otter live in the area. Ten pairs of the sandhill crane breed in the National Wildlife Refuge. According to the bird list from the Trempealeau National Wildlife Refuge 263 bird species occur regularly in the area, 21 species exceptionally and 121 species breed. You can view current bird observations in the area on the digital platform EBird.

== Images ==
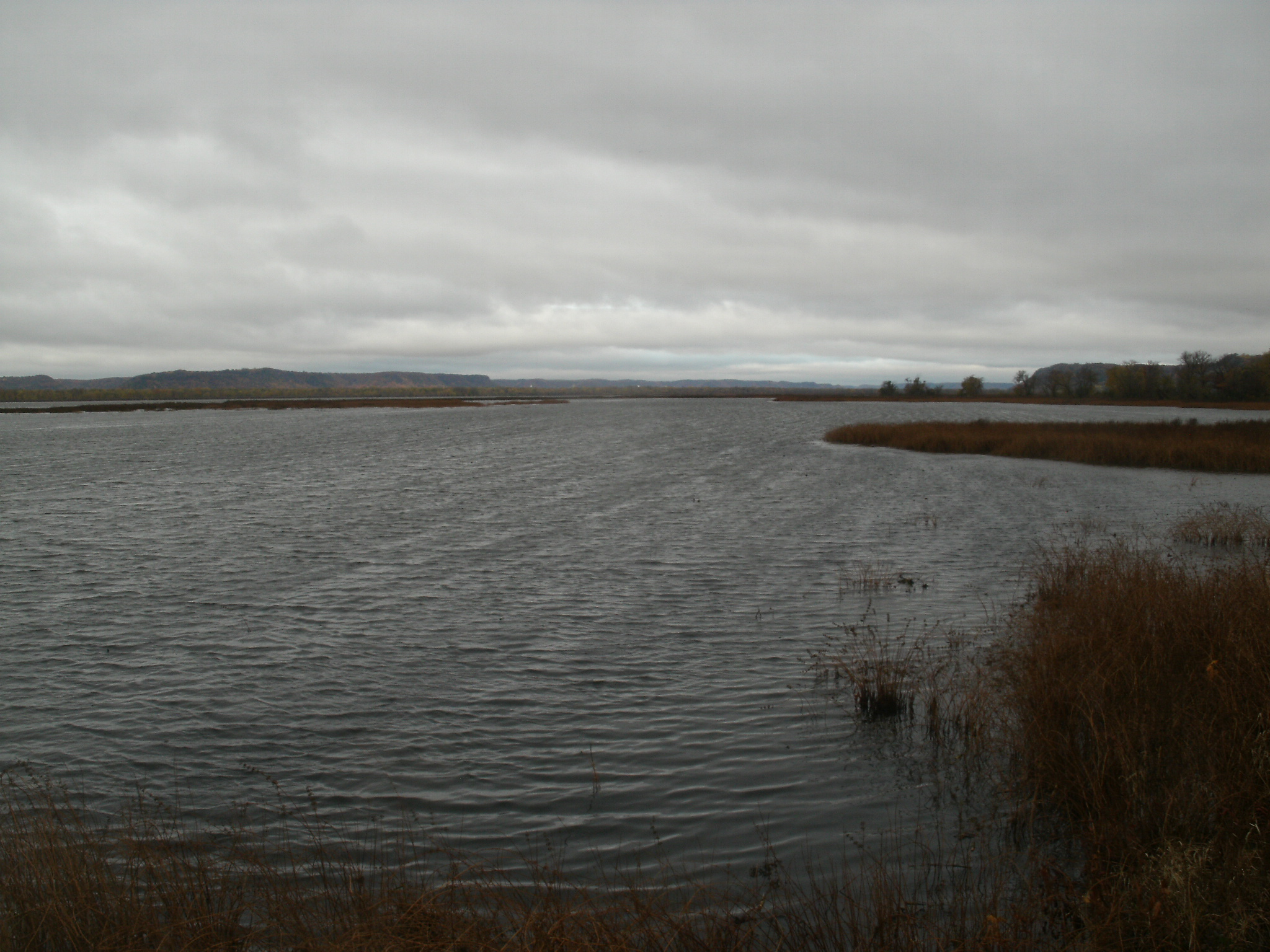
water area in the National Wildlife Refuge

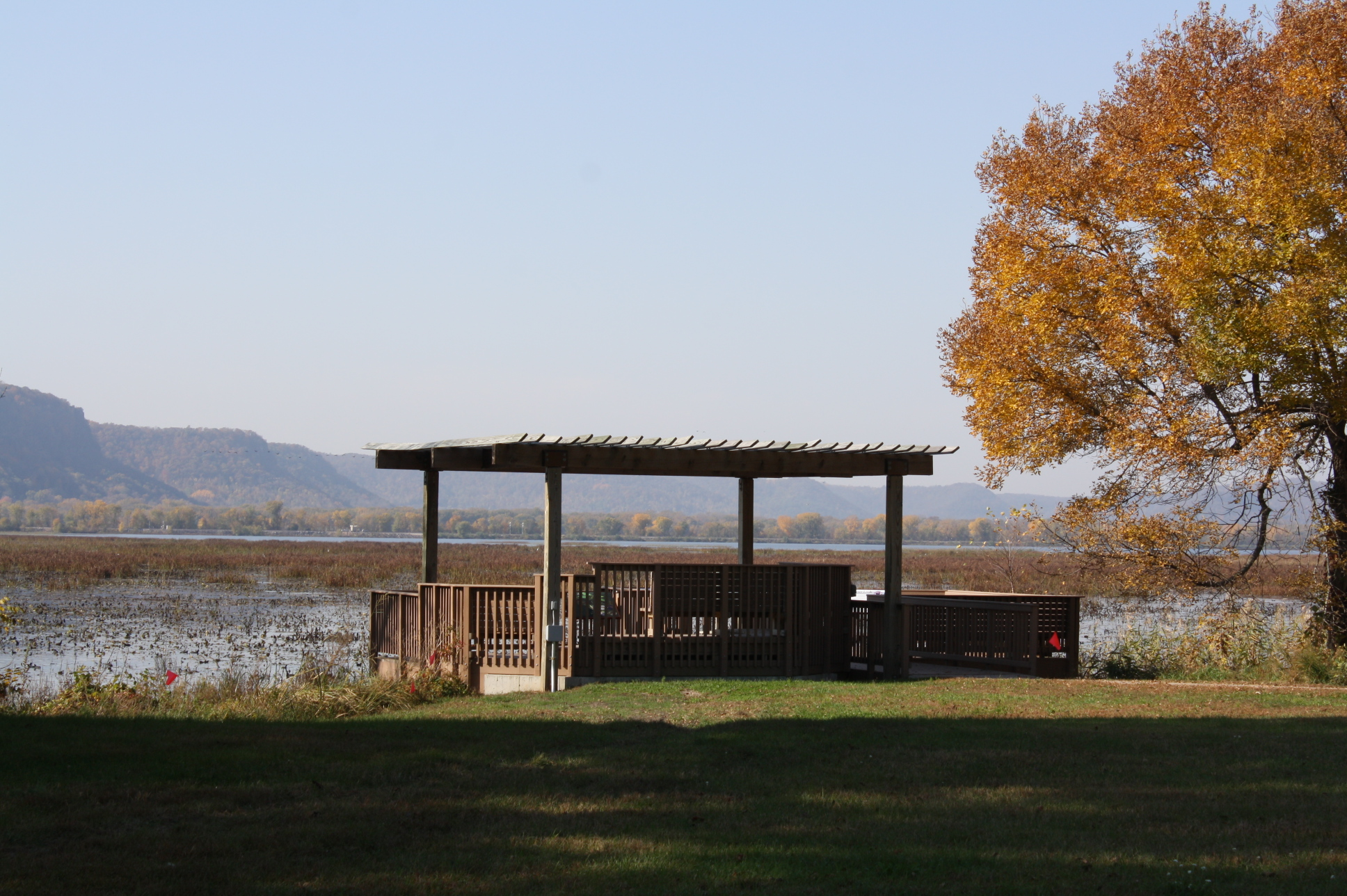
Observation deck

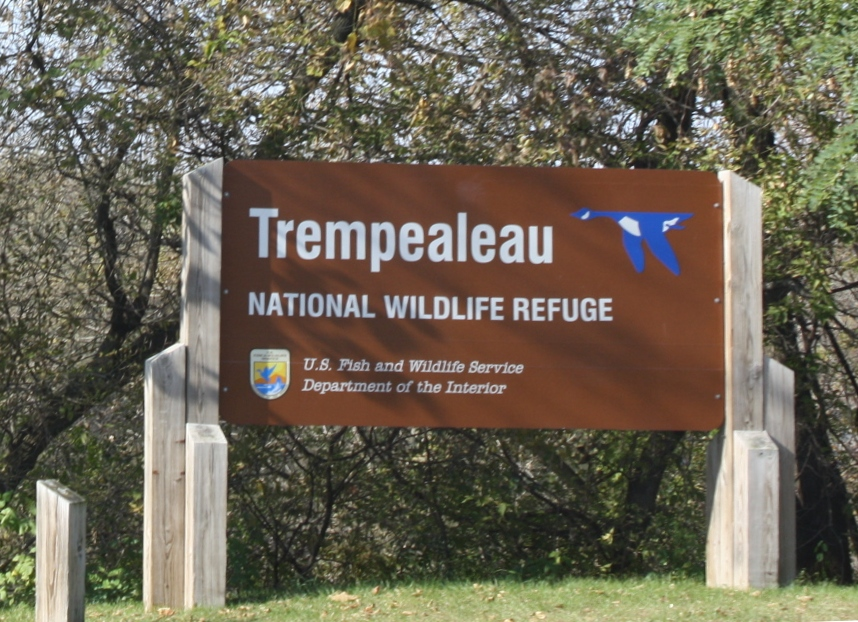
Sign

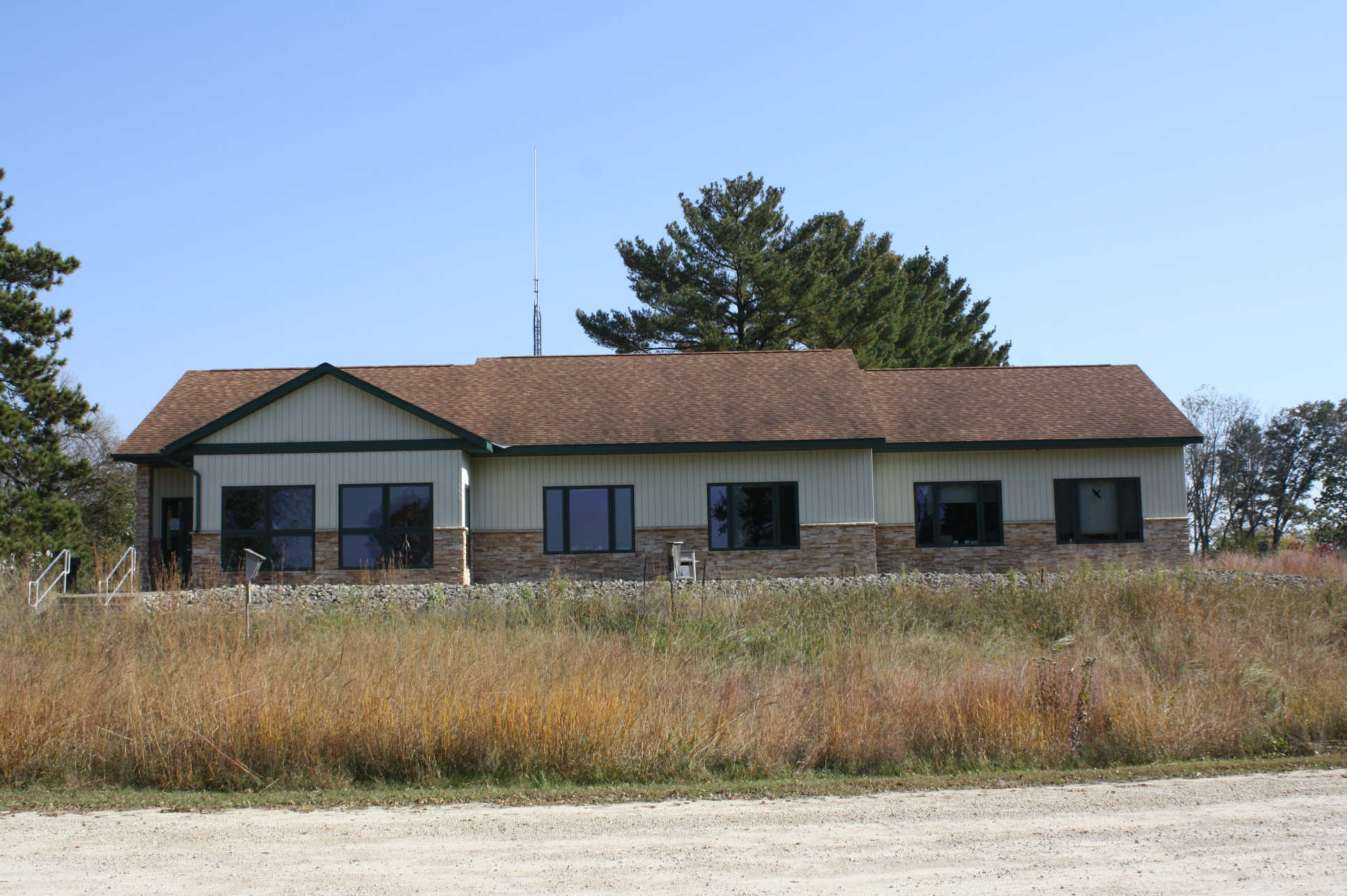
Visitor Center

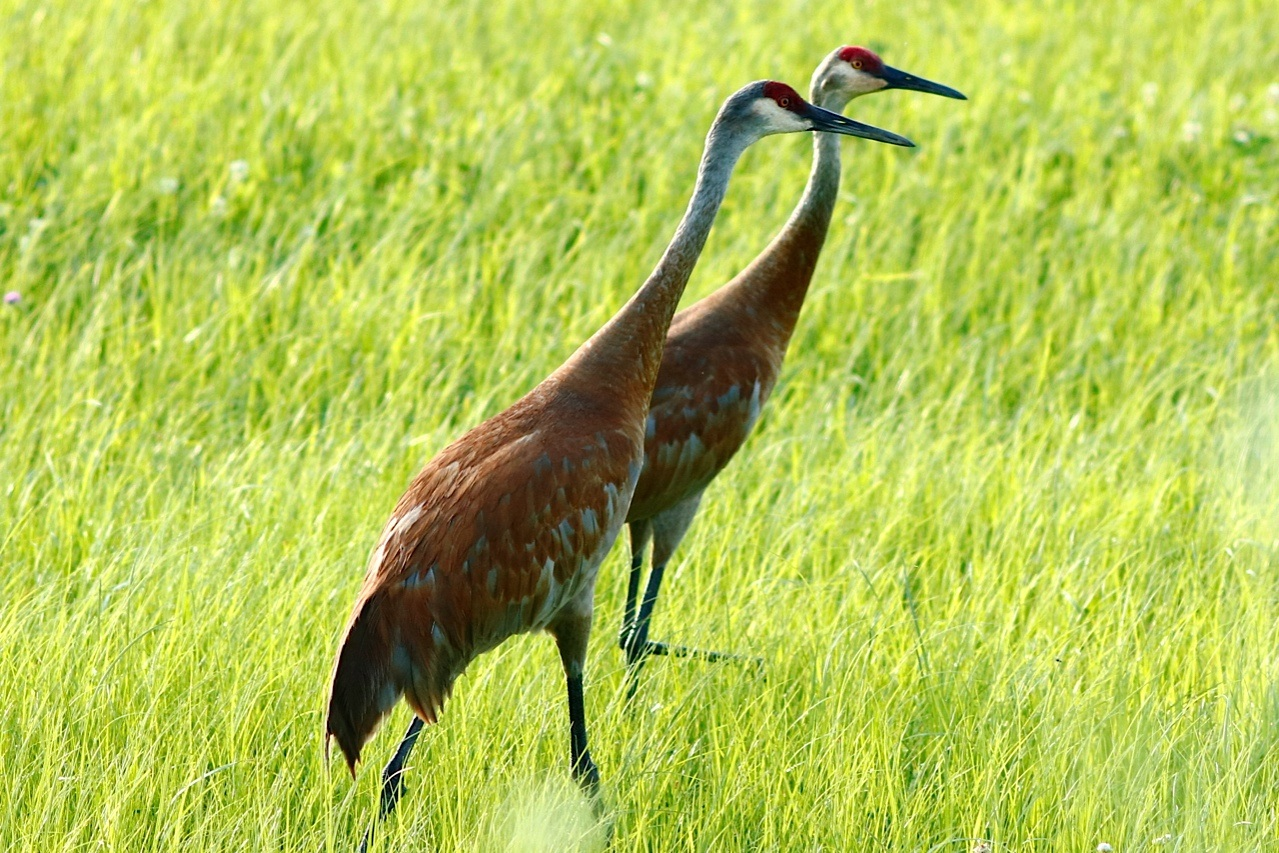
Sandhill Crane
