= Medary (community), Wisconsin =

Medary, Wisconsin
- Unincorporated community
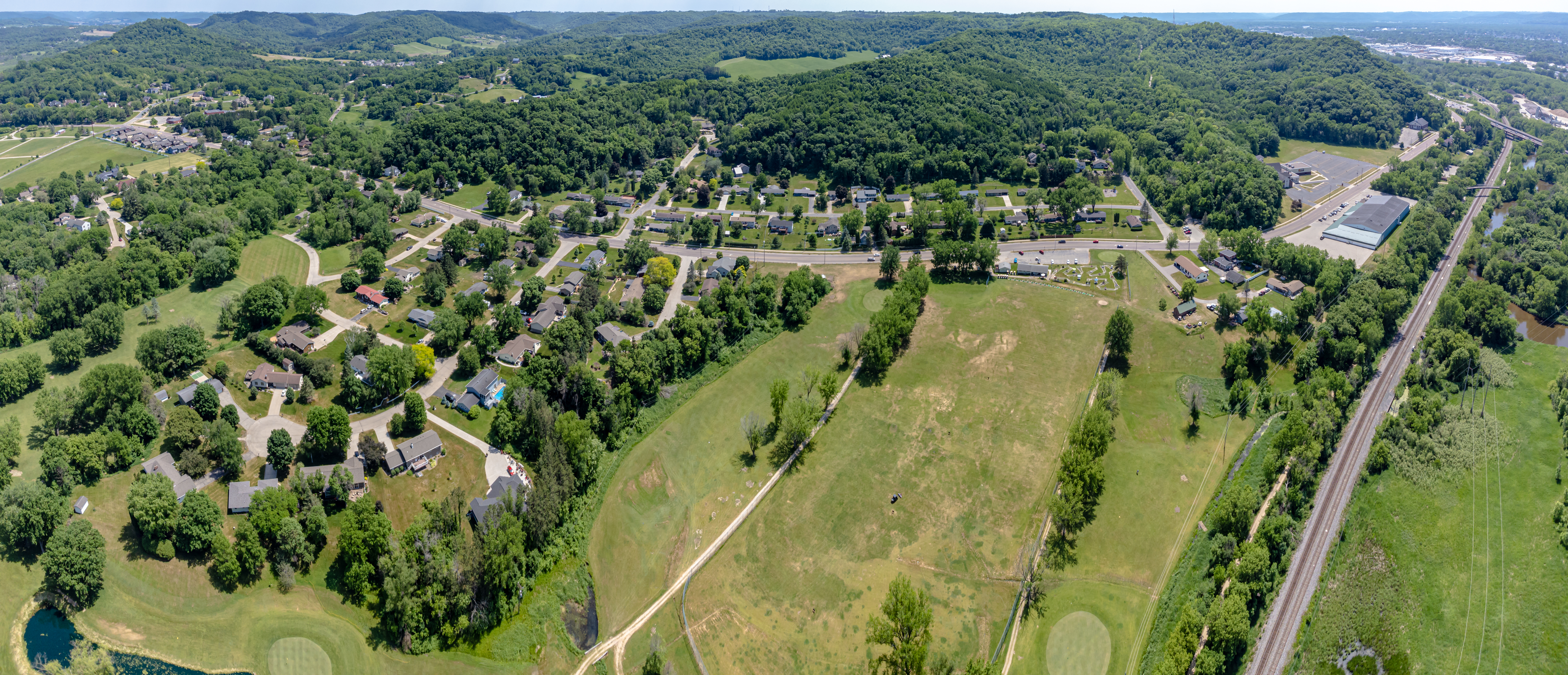

- Location within Wisconsin Location within the United States
- Coordinates: 43°51′19″N 91°12′34″W
- Country: United States
- State: Wisconsin
- County: La Crosse
- Town: Medary
- Elevation: 686 ft (209 m)
- Time zone: UTC-6 (Central (CST))
  - Summer (DST): UTC-5 (CDT)
- Area code: 608
- GNIS feature ID: 1569305

Medary (also Winona Junction) is an unincorporated community located in the town of Medary, La Crosse County, Wisconsin, United States. The Great River State Trail has its trailhead located here.

== History ==
The La Crosse, Trempealeau & Prescott Railroad chartered to build from a point across the river from Winona, Minnesota to connect with the Chicago, Milwaukee and St. Paul railroad. This rail junction originally was called Trempealeau Junction, but later became Winona Junction. The railroad was consolidated with the Chicago and North Western Railway June 6, 1877. The area was renamed in honor of Samuel Medary, an American politician. A community post office operated under the name Medary in 1895 until 1900.

== See also ==
- Medary, Wisconsin - the surrounding town
