= Perrot State Park =

State Park in Trempealeau County, Wisconsin

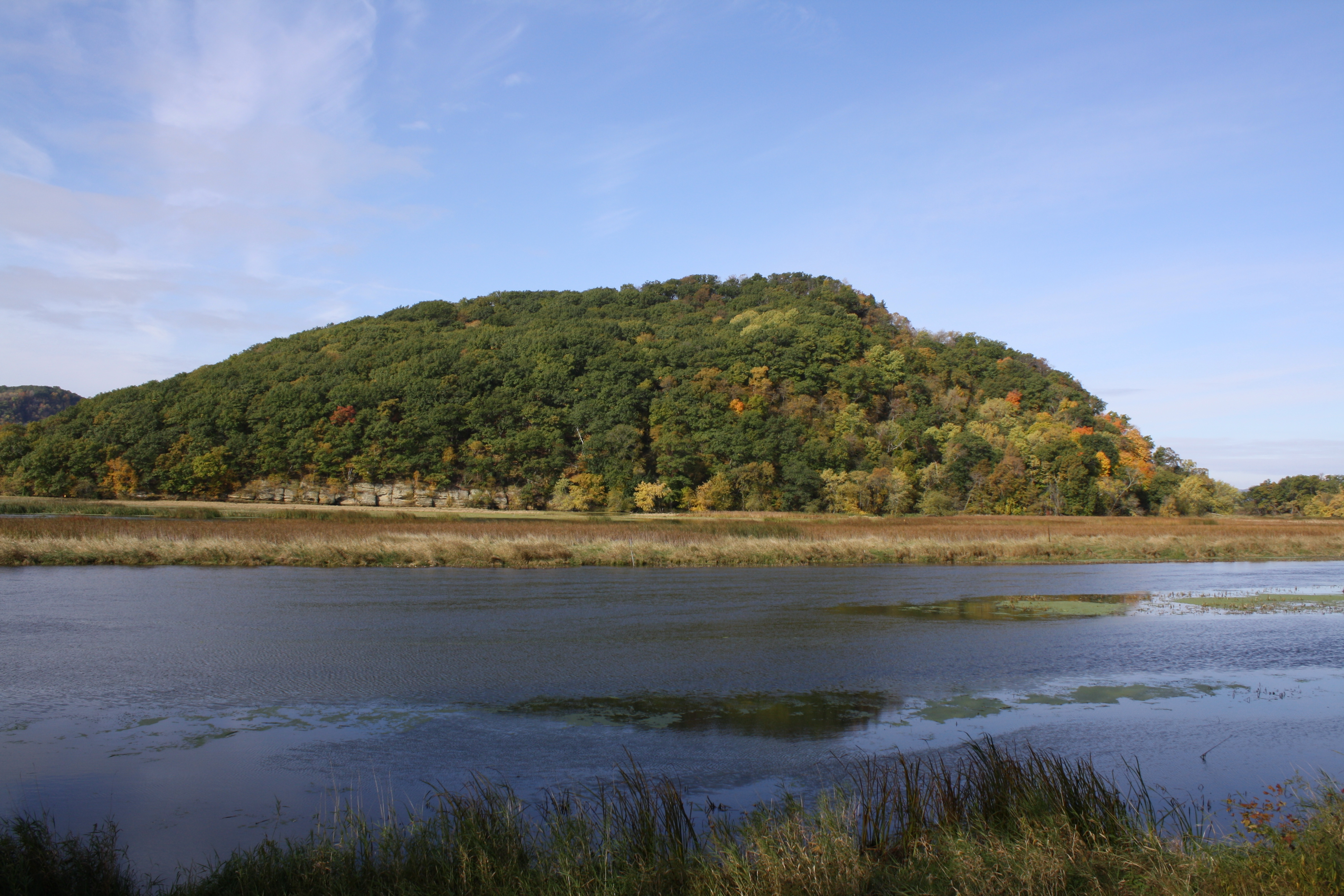
- Trempealeau Mountain

- Location within Wisconsin Location within the United States
- Interactive map of Perrot State Park
- Location: Trempealeau County, Wisconsin, United States
- Coordinates: 44°1′16″N 91°29′46″W
- Area: 1,270 acres (510 ha)
- Elevation: 958 ft (292 m)
- Established: 1918
- Administrator: Wisconsin Department of Natural Resources
- Named for: Nicolas Perrot
- Website: Official website
- Wisconsin State Parks

Perrot State Park is a state park in Wisconsin's Driftless Area at the confluence of the Trempealeau and Mississippi rivers. The 1,270-acre (514 ha) park features views of steep limestone bluffs and the river valleys. It has observation platforms for watching wildlife, including the variety of birds which inhabit or migrate through the park. Hiking trails and camping are available. Mountain bike trails penetrate deep inside the park.

The park protects two state natural areas: Brady's Bluff Prairie and Trempealeau Mountain, a cone-shaped mountain surrounded by water. The Native Americans of the area traditionally considered the mountain sacred and used it as a landmark for meetings. Some earthwork mounds made by ancient Native American cultures are located in the park.

This facility protects the site of one of the earliest encampments by European explorers in the upper Mississippi. The park is named for Nicolas Perrot, a French explorer who was the first to write about the area.

The Trempealeau National Wildlife Refuge borders on the north.

== Gallery ==
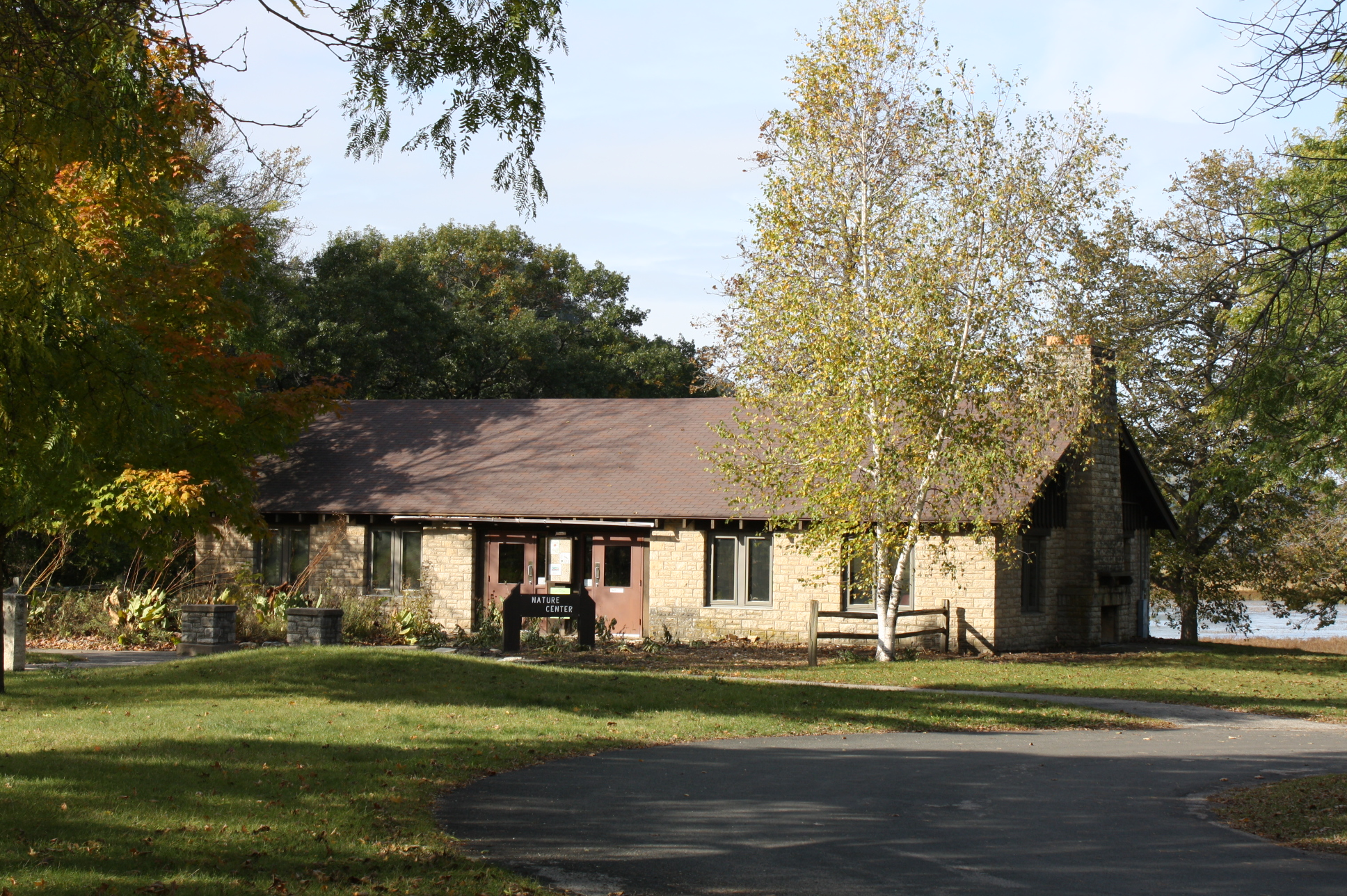
Nature Center

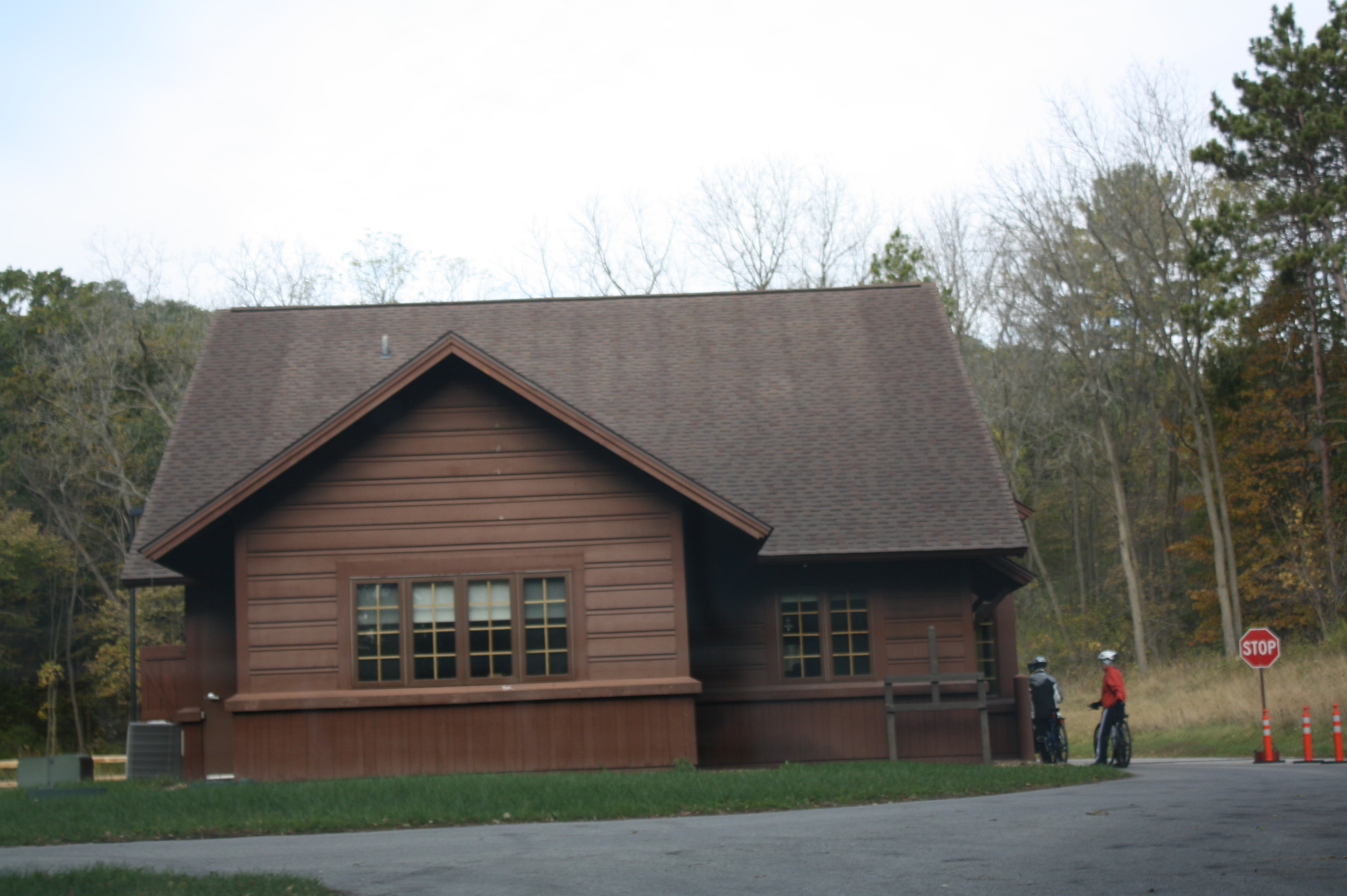
Ranger station
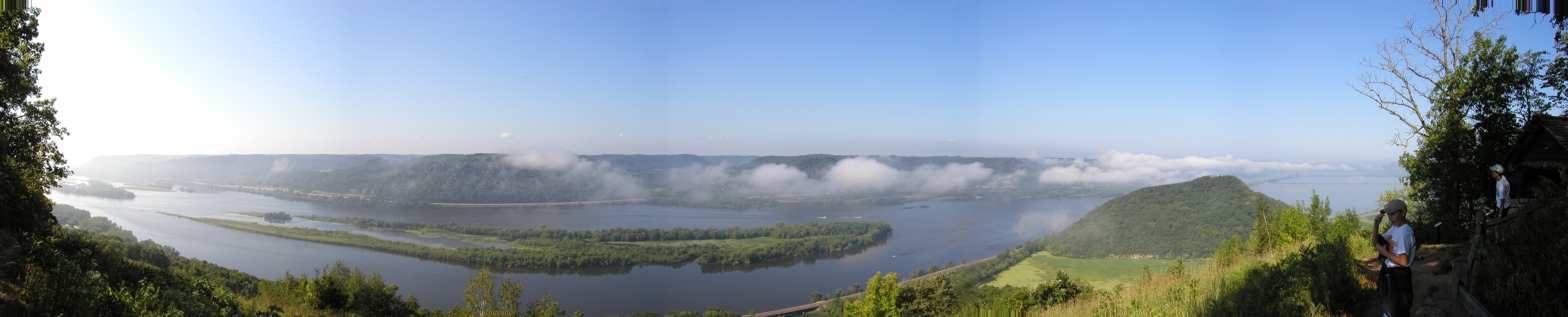
View from Brady's Bluff shelter, looking south across the Mississippi River to Minnesota. August 2003
