= Cycling in Berlin =

Transport by bicycle in Berlin, Germany

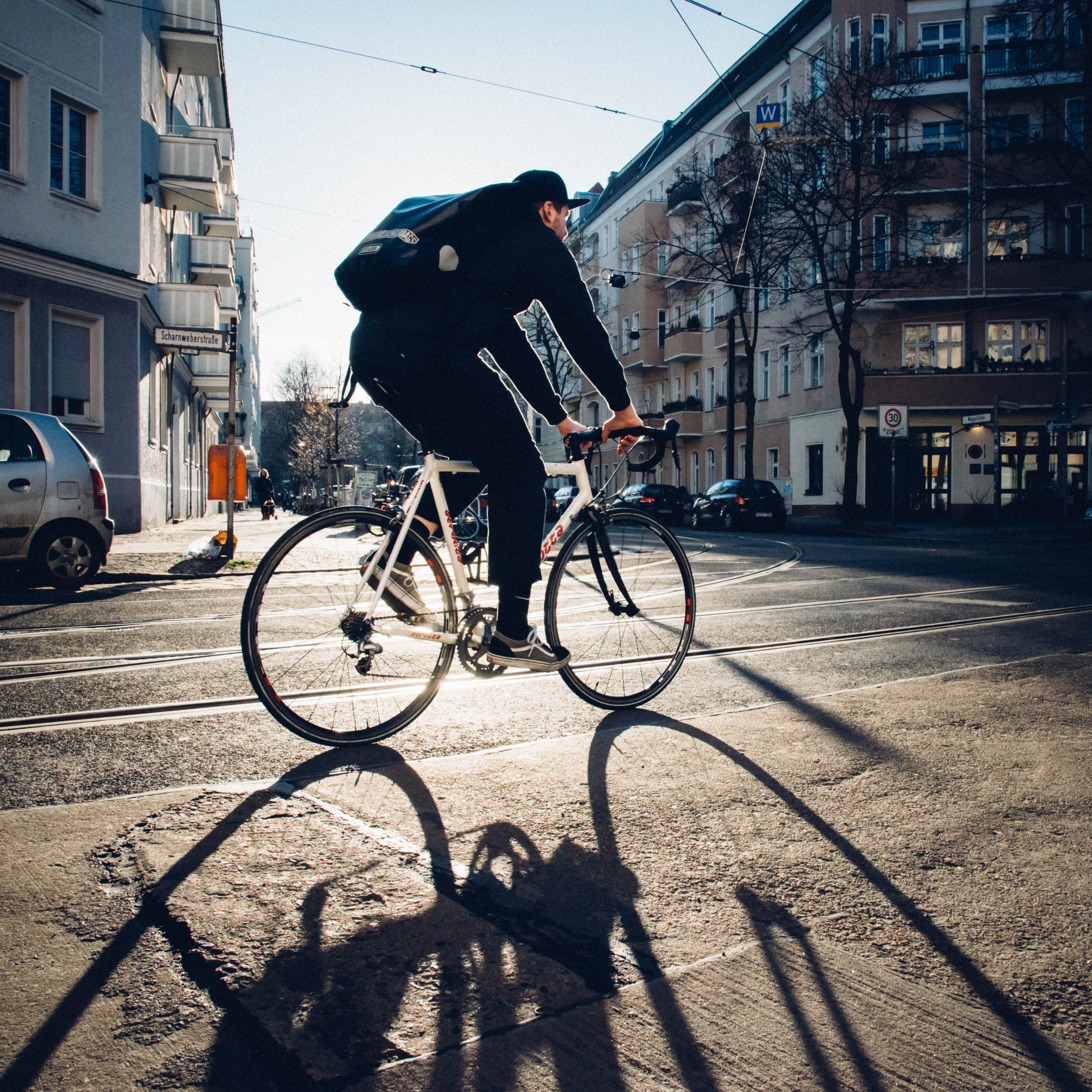
Cyclist in Berlin

Cycling is an important part of Berlin's transport system, accounting for 18% of trips made by residents in 2023. The city's Cycling Plan defines a planned cycling network of 2,371 kilometres (1,473 mi), including an 865-kilometre (537 mi) priority network. The plan, which forms part of the framework established by the Berlin Mobility Act, aims to increase the share of trips made by bicycle to at least 23% by 2030.

Following amendments to the Mobility Act in July 2026, the target for completing the priority network remained 2030, while the target for the full network was extended to 2035.

== Bicycle network ==
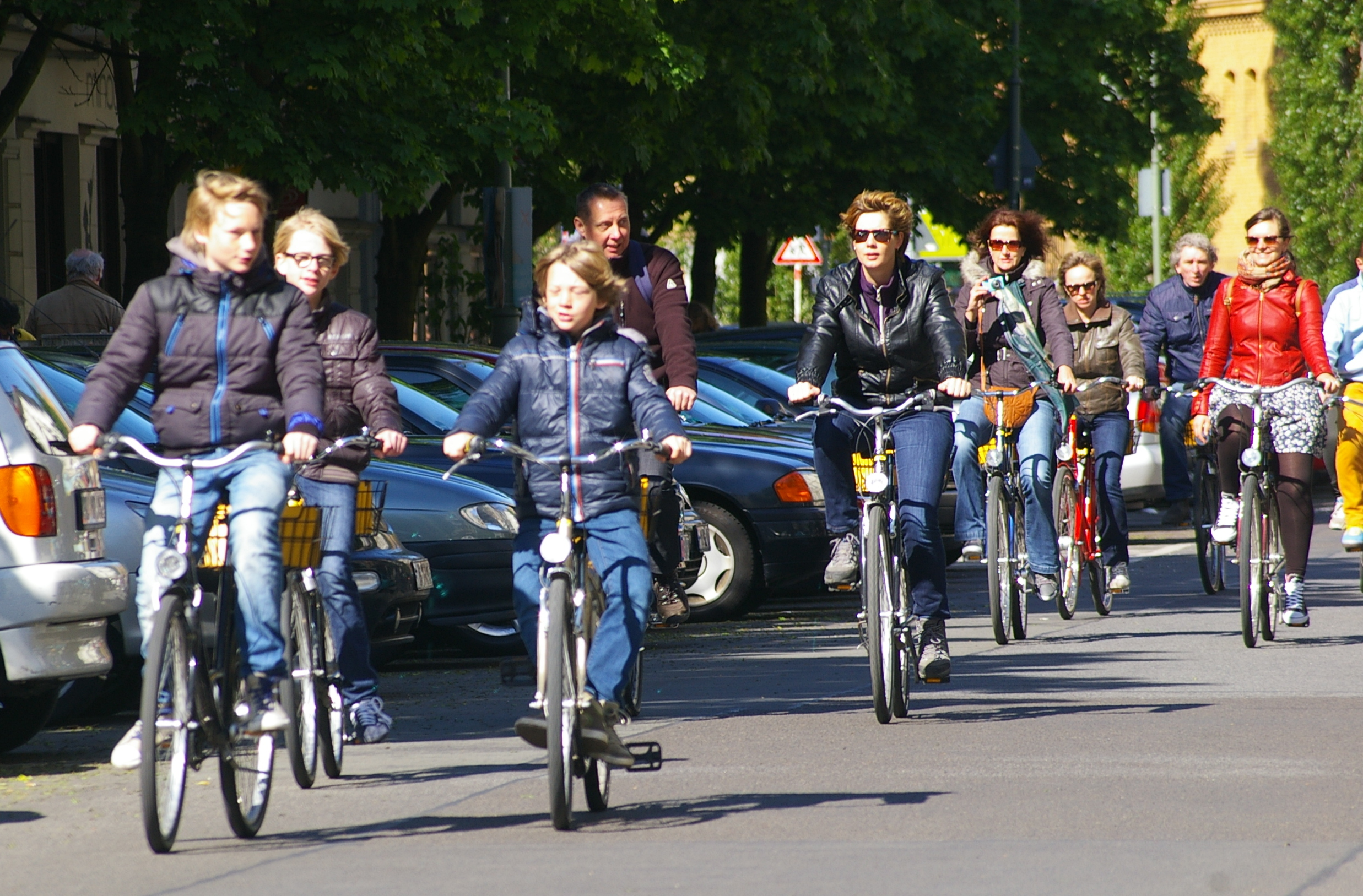
Cyclists in Prenzlauer Berg, Berlin

Berlin's cycling network is divided into a priority network (Vorrangnetz) and a supplementary network (Ergänzungsnetz). The priority network comprises the main cycling routes of citywide importance, connecting major destinations across Berlin. These routes are given priority in implementation and are subject to higher standards for cycling infrastructure. The supplementary network extends coverage by providing additional connections between neighbourhoods, local destinations and the priority network.

The network uses different forms of cycling infrastructure depending on street type and local conditions, including cycle tracks, on-road cycle lanes, protected cycle lanes and bicycle streets (Fahrradstraßen). These are streets where cycling is given the primary role, as other vehicle traffic is permitted only where indicated by signs and must not endanger or obstruct cyclists. A speed limit of 30 km/h (19 mph) applies, and cyclists may ride side by side.

Much of the planned network has yet to be completed. According to figures provided by the Senate transport administration, 78.2 kilometres (48.6 mi) of the approximately 870-kilometre priority network had been implemented by May 2026, less than one tenth of the planned total.

=== Long-distance routes ===
Several regional and international long-distance cycle routes pass through Berlin. The European Cycle Route R1 crosses the city from west to east and forms part of both Germany's D-Route 3 and EuroVelo 2. Two other major routes begin in Berlin: the Berlin–Copenhagen Cycle Route, which continues north towards Copenhagen and forms part of EuroVelo 7, and the Berlin–Usedom Cycle Route, which connects the city with the Baltic Sea island of Usedom.

The approximately 160-kilometre (99 mi) Berliner Mauerweg is a cycling and walking route that follows the former border around West Berlin.

== Bicycles on public transport ==
Bicycles are permitted on S-Bahn and U-Bahn trains, regional rail services, trams and ferries, subject to available space. They are also permitted on the N1–N9 night bus routes.

A separate bicycle ticket is generally required under the Verkehrsverbund Berlin-Brandenburg (VBB) tariff, although some personal tickets include bicycle transport.

== Bicycle sharing and subscriptions ==
Berlin is served by several bicycle-sharing systems.

Nextbike operates a commercial bicycle-sharing network in the city. Until June 2025, the system operated with public funding on behalf of the state of Berlin. In 2023, it recorded more than two million journeys and comprised around 6,600 bicycles.

Call a Bike, operated by Deutsche Bahn, also provides bicycle sharing in Berlin, with more than 540 stations within the S-Bahn Ring. Commercial operators also provide shared e-bikes under Berlin's permit system for stationless micromobility.

For longer-term use, Swapfiets offers conventional bicycles and e-bikes through a subscription service in Berlin, with maintenance and repairs included in the monthly fee.

== Velodrom ==
The Velodrom is Berlin's principal indoor track cycling arena. Opened in 1997, it contains a permanent 250-metre (820 ft) wooden cycling track and hosts the Six Days of Berlin. The arena has also hosted major international competitions, including the 1999 and 2020 UCI Track Cycling World Championships.

== See also ==
- Bicycle
- Bicycle culture
- Cycling infrastructure
