= Saxony-Anhalt =

State in Germany

Saxony-Anhalt Sachsen-Anhalt (German) Sassen-Anholt (Low German)
- State
- Flag Coat of arms
- Anthem: Lied für Sachsen-Anhalt (German) "Song for Saxony-Anhalt"
- Interactive map of Saxony-Anhalt
- Coordinates: 52°00′N 11°42′E
- Country: Germany
- Capital (and largest city): Magdeburg

Government
  - Body: Landtag of Saxony-Anhalt
  - Minister-President: Sven Schulze (CDU)
  - Governing parties: CDU / SPD
  - Bundesrat votes: 4 (of 69)
  - Bundestag seats: 16 (of 630) (as of 2025)

Area
  - Total: 20,555 km^{2} (7,936 sq mi)

Population (2025-12-31)
  - Total: 2,120,252
  - Density: 103.15/km^{2} (267.16/sq mi)

GDP
  - Total: €81.755 billion (2025)
  - Per capita: €38,282 (2025)
- Time zone: UTC+1 (CET)
  - Summer (DST): UTC+2 (CEST)
- ISO 3166 code: DE-ST
- NUTS Region: DEE
- HDI (2022): 0.921 very high · 16th of 16
- Website: sachsen-anhalt.de

Saxony-Anhalt (/ ... ˈɑːnhɑːlt/ ... AHN-hahlt; German: Sachsen-Anhalt [ˌzaksn̩ ˈʔanhalt]; Low German: Sassen-Anholt) is a landlocked state of Germany. It covers an area of 20,555 square kilometres (7,936 sq mi) and has a population of about 2.14 million inhabitants, making it the 8th-largest state in Germany by area and the 11th-largest by population. Saxony-Anhalt borders the states of Brandenburg, Saxony, Thuringia and Lower Saxony. Its capital is Magdeburg.

Saxony-Anhalt was formed in July 1945 after World War II, when the Soviet army administration in Allied-occupied Germany formed it from the former Prussian Province of Saxony and the Free State of Anhalt. Saxony-Anhalt became part of the German Democratic Republic in 1949, but was dissolved in 1952 during administrative reforms and its territory was divided into the districts of Halle and Magdeburg. Following German reunification, the state of Saxony-Anhalt was re-established in 1990 and became one of the new states of the Federal Republic of Germany.

Six UNESCO World Heritage sites in Germany are located in Saxony-Anhalt, including the Bauhaus sites in Dessau and the Dessau-Wörlitz Garden Realm.

== Geography ==
Saxony-Anhalt is one of 16 constituent states of Germany. It is located in the western part of eastern Germany. By size, it is the 8th largest state in Germany and by population, it is the 11th largest.

It borders four other states: Brandenburg to the north-east, Saxony to the south-east, Thuringia to the south-west and Lower Saxony to the north-west.

In the north, the Saxony-Anhalt landscape is dominated by the flat expanse of the North German Plain. The old Hanseatic towns Salzwedel, Gardelegen, Stendal and Tangermünde are located in the sparsely populated Altmark. The Colbitz-Letzlingen Heath and the Drömling near Wolfsburg mark the transition between the Altmark region and the Elbe-Börde-Heath region with its fertile, sparsely wooded Magdeburg Börde. Notable towns in the Magdeburg Börde are Haldensleben, Oschersleben (Bode), Wanzleben, Schönebeck (Elbe), Aschersleben and the capital Magdeburg, from which the Börde derives its name.

The Harz mountains are located in the south-west, comprising the Harz National Park, the Harz Foreland and Mansfeld Land. The highest mountain of the Harz (and of Northern Germany) is Brocken, with an elevation of 1,141 meters (3,735 ft). In this area, one can find the towns of Halberstadt, Wernigerode, Thale, Eisleben and Quedlinburg.

The wine-growing area Saale-Unstrut and the towns of Zeitz, Naumburg (Saale), Weißenfels and Freyburg (Unstrut) are located on the rivers Saale and Unstrut in the south of the state.

The metropolitan area of Halle (Saale) forms an agglomeration with Leipzig in Saxony. This area is known for its highly developed chemical industry (the Chemiedreieck – chemical triangle), with major production plants at Leuna, Schkopau (Buna-Werke) and Bitterfeld. Finally, in the east, Dessau-Roßlau and Wittenberg are situated on the Elbe (as is the capital Magdeburg) in the Anhalt-Wittenberg region.

== Administrative subdivisions ==
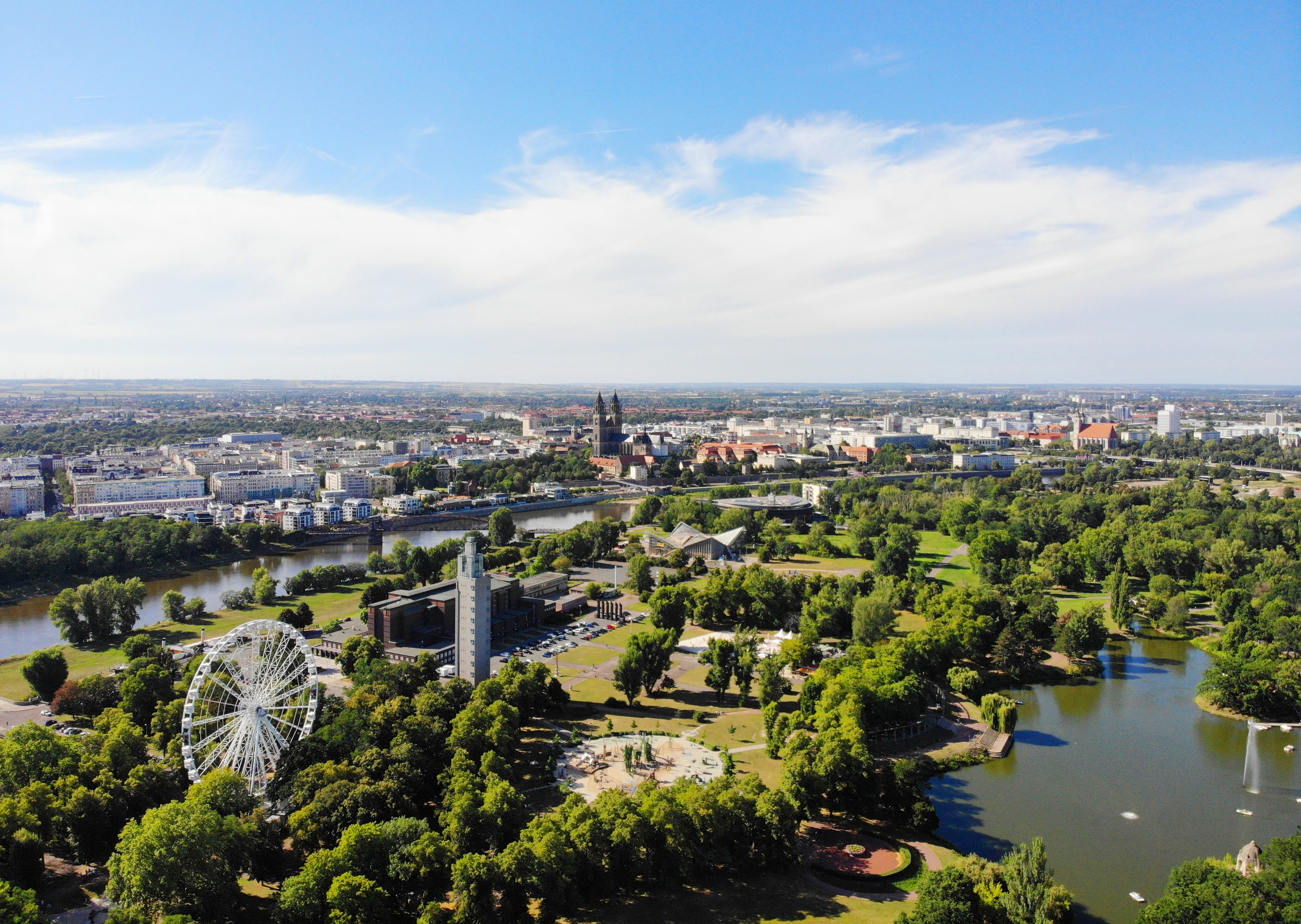
Aerial view to the city centre of Magdeburg, Saxony-Anhalt's capital city

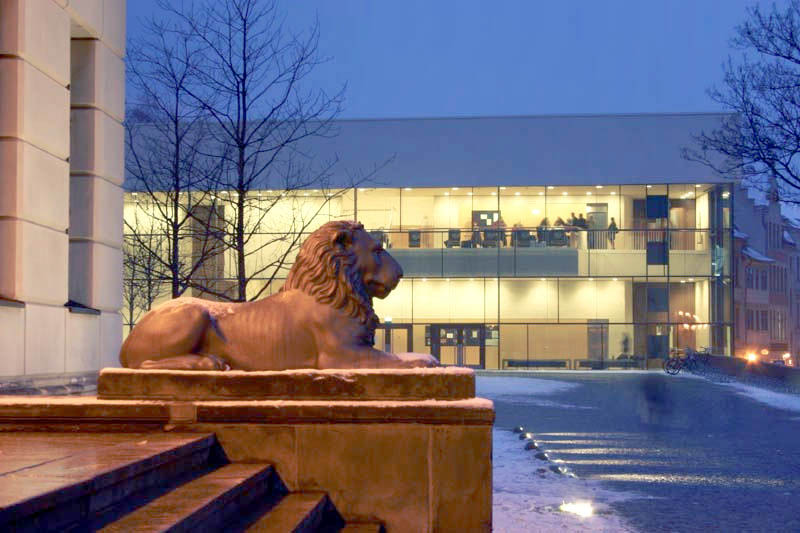
Saxony-Anhalt's second most populous city, Halle (Saale), is the seat of the state's largest university

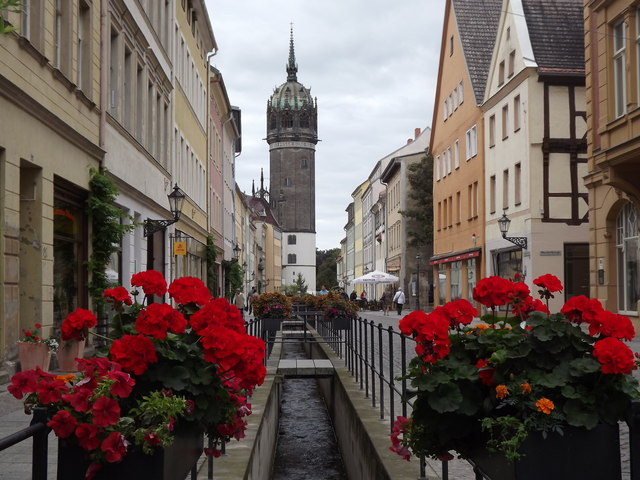
Wittenberg was once one of the most important cities in Germany, especially for its close connection with Martin Luther

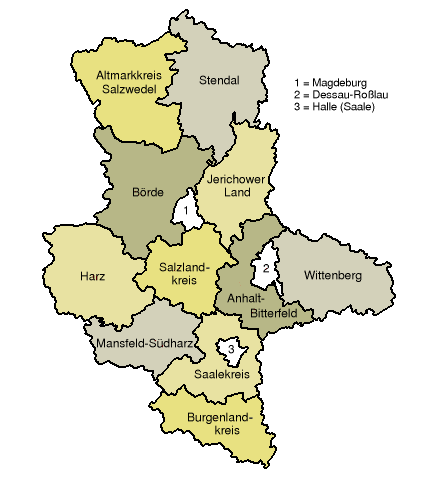
The capital and largest city of Saxony-Anhalt is Magdeburg. The second-largest city in the state is Halle (Saale). From 1994 to 2003, the state was divided into three regions (Regierungsbezirke), Dessau, Halle and Magdeburg and, below the regional level, 21 districts (Landkreise). Since 2004, however, this system has been replaced by 11 rural districts and three urban districts.

The districts are:

- Altmarkkreis Salzwedel
- Anhalt-Bitterfeld
- Börde
- Burgenlandkreis
- Harz
- Jerichower Land
- Mansfeld-Südharz
- Saalekreis
- Salzlandkreis
- Stendal
- Wittenberg

The independent cities are:

- Dessau-Roßlau
- Halle (Saale)
- Magdeburg

=== Largest towns ===
The largest towns in Saxony-Anhalt as of 30 June 2022:

Rank	City	Population
1	Magdeburg	241,517
2	Halle	226,586
3	Dessau-Roßlau	75,938
4	Lutherstadt Wittenberg	45,010
5	Weißenfels	38,228
6	Halberstadt	36,676
7	Stendal	37,406
8	Bitterfeld-Wolfen	36,552
9	Merseburg	33,302
10	Wernigerode	32,477

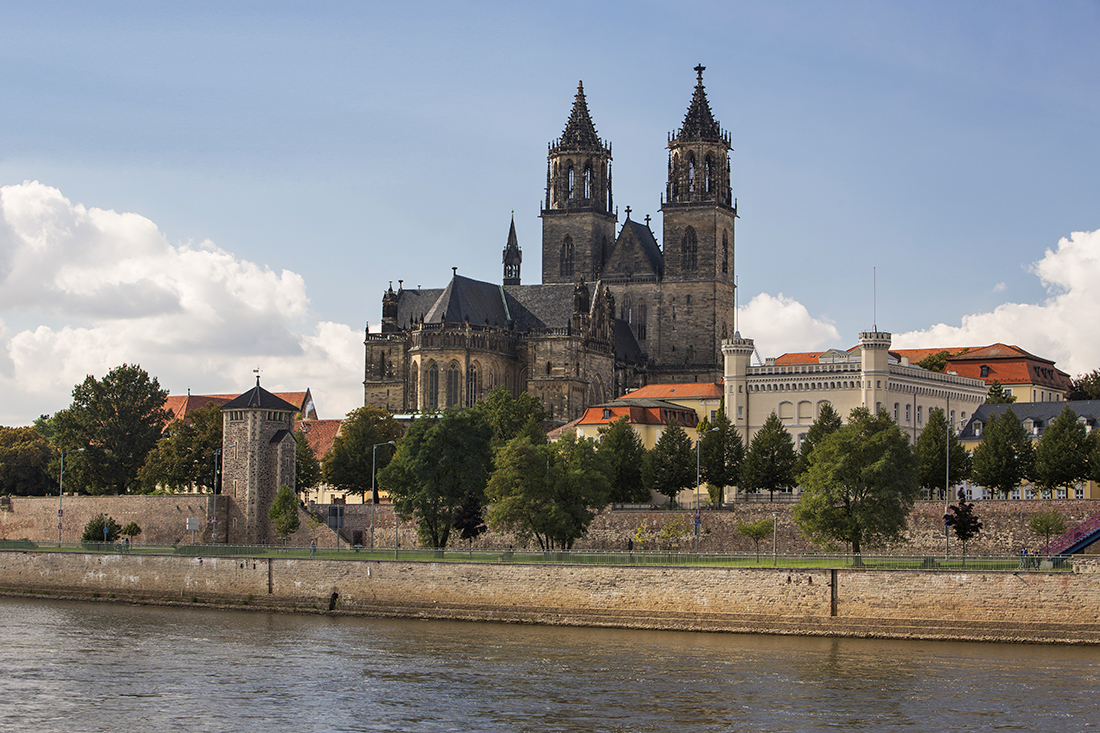
Magdeburg - Capital city of Saxony-Anhalt - The Magdeburg Cathedral is the city's landmark.

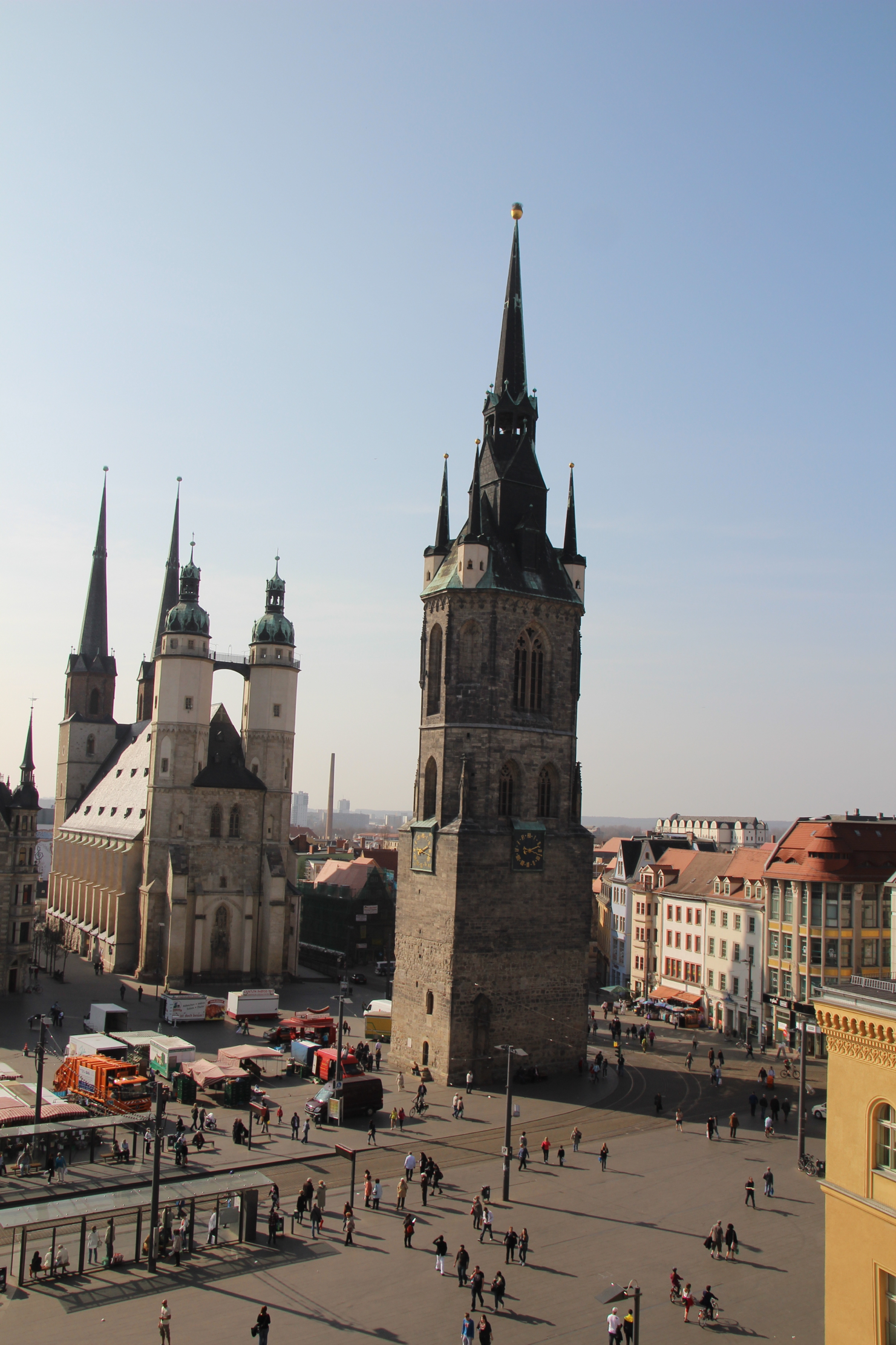
Halle is the second-largest city in Saxony-Anhalt.

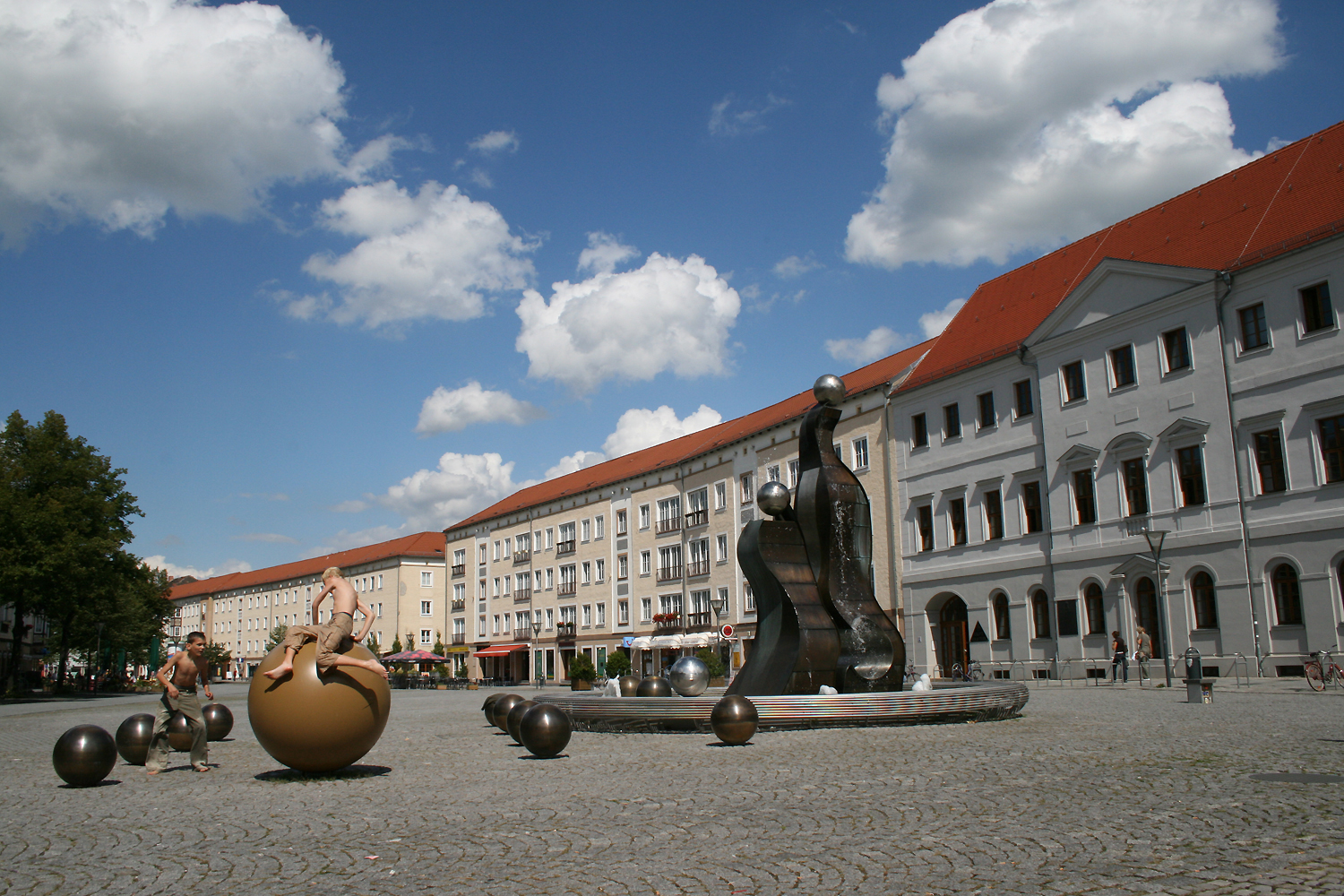
Dessau market square

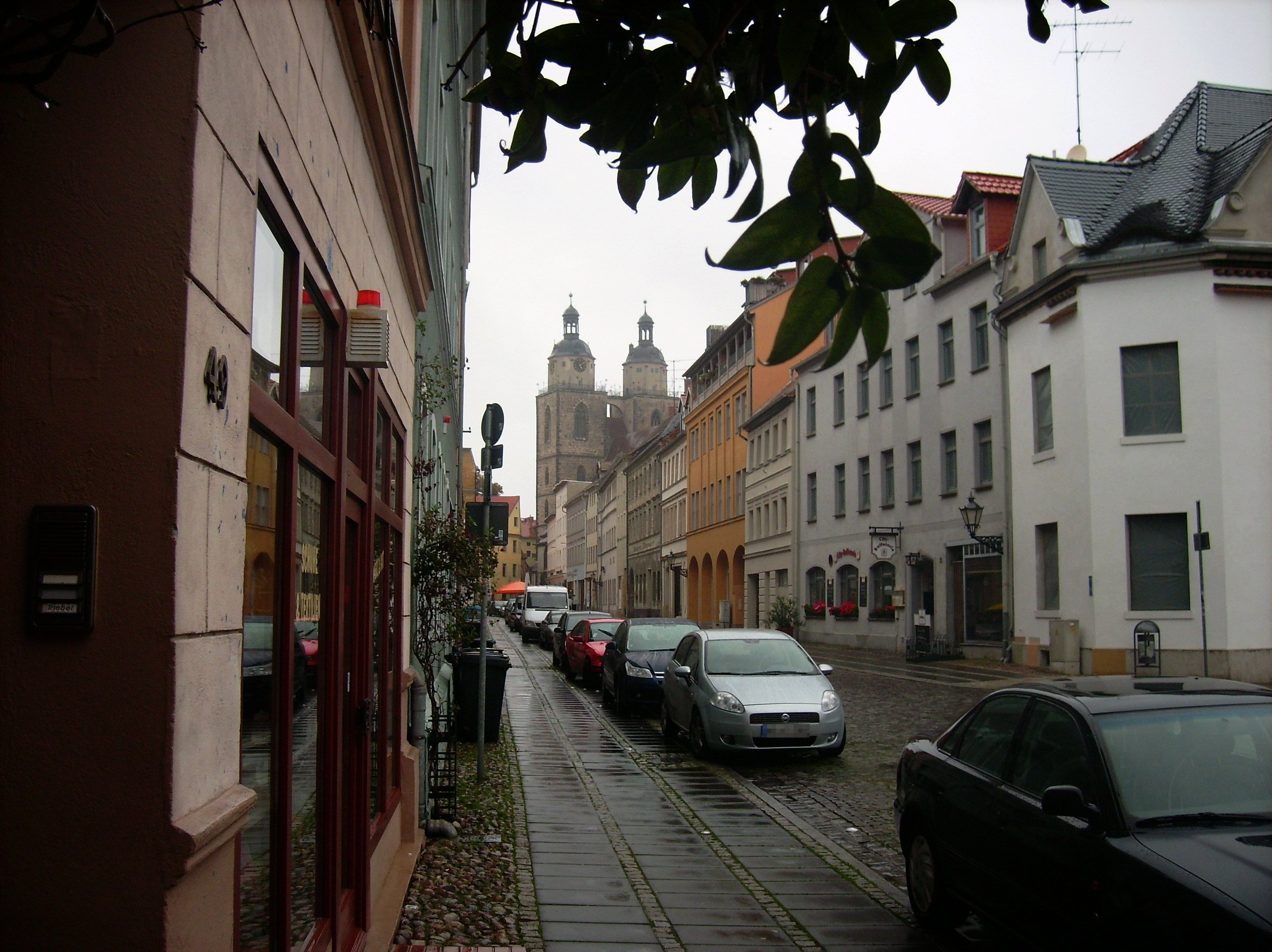
Inside the old town of Wittenberg, a UNESCO World Heritage Site

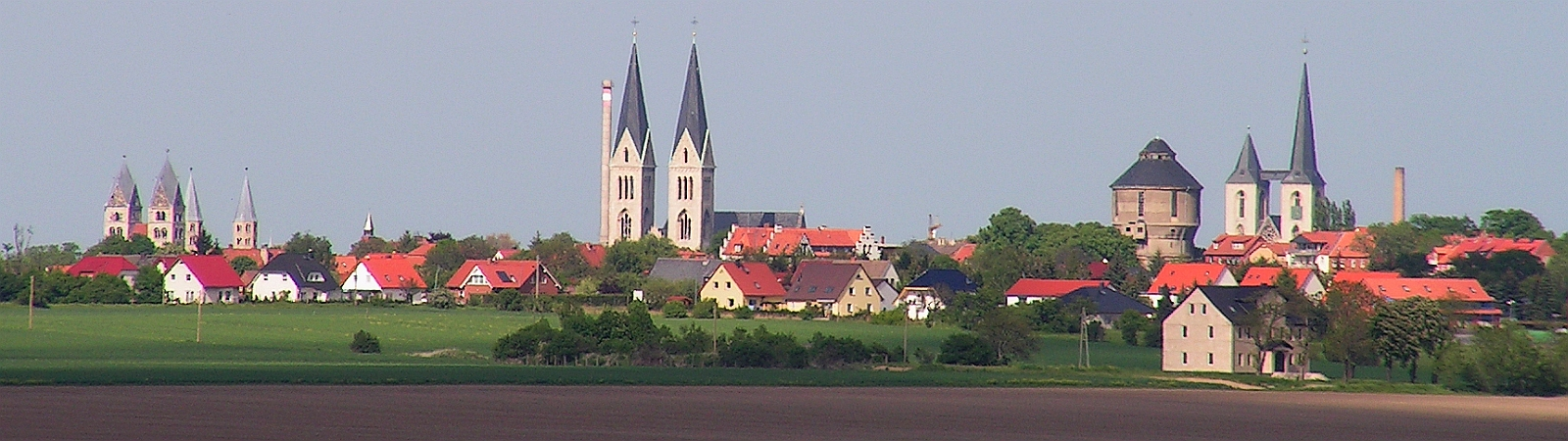
Halberstadt with its churches

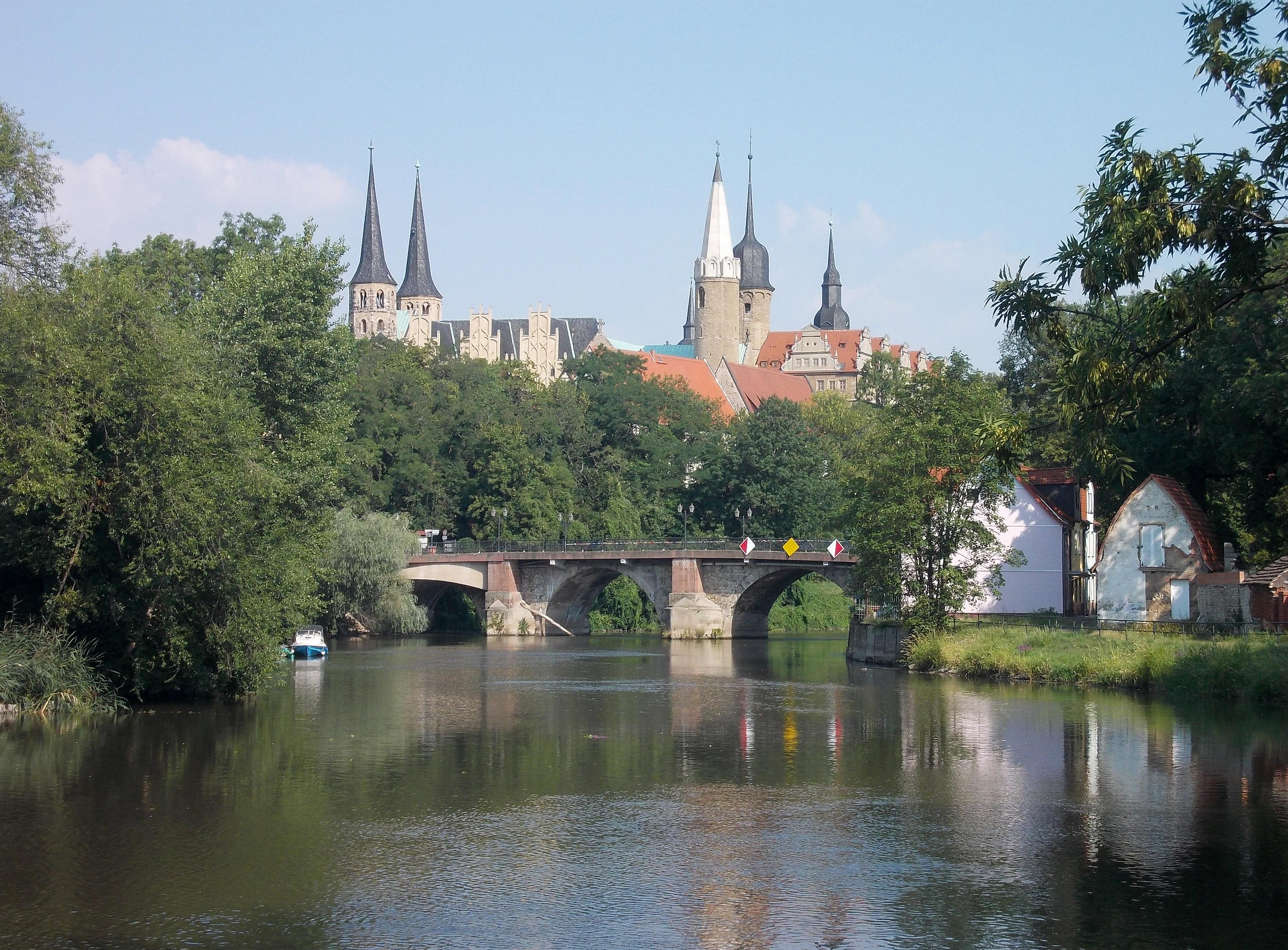
Merseburg with its castle and cathedral

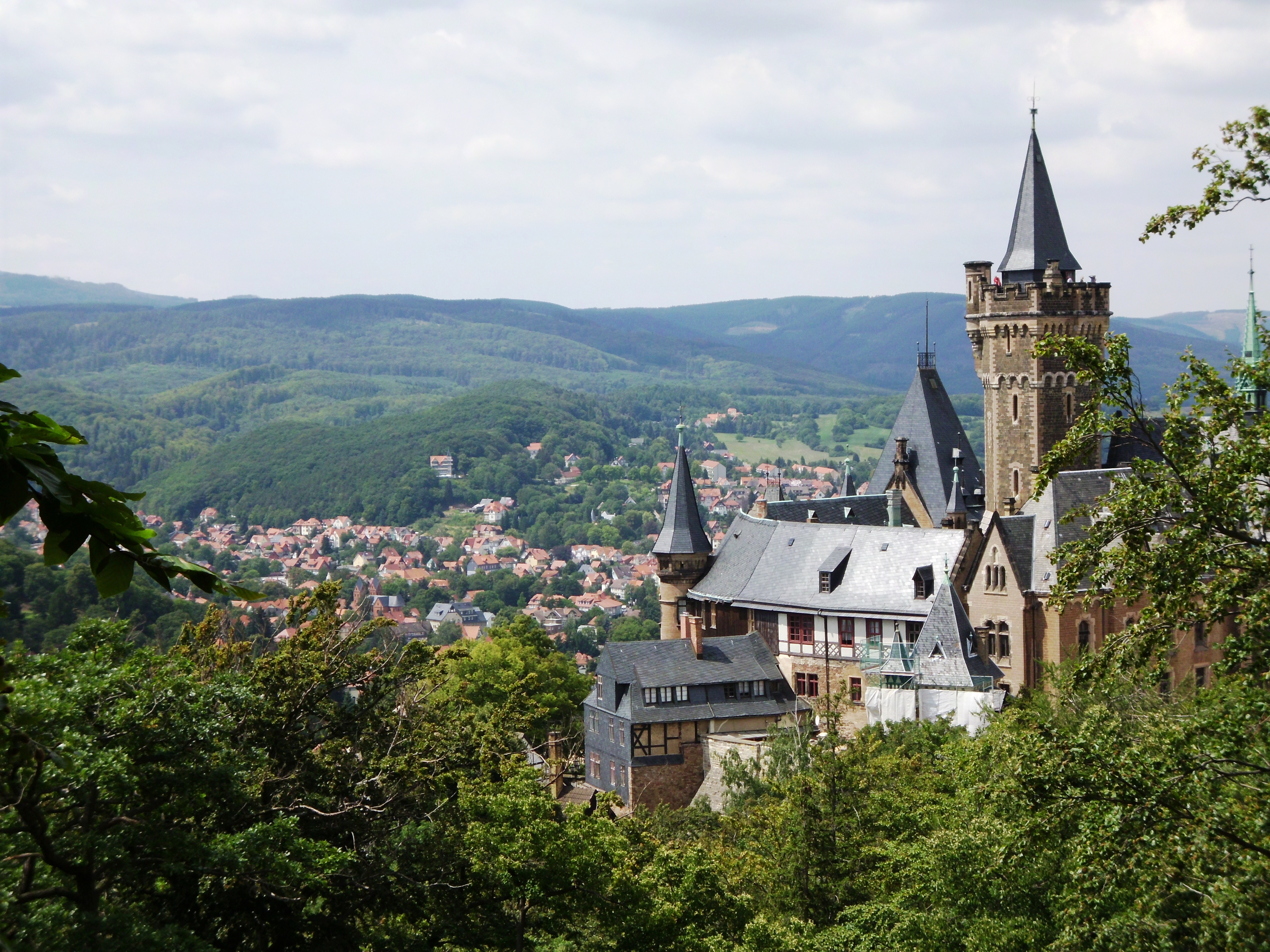
Castle in Wernigerode

== History ==
Coat of arms of Saxony-Anhalt between 1946 and 1952

Saxony-Anhalt is a federal state with a relatively short history, compared to other German federal states. It was formed in 1945 out of former Prussian territories and mainly consists of three distinct historical regions: the area around Magdeburg, the formerly independent Anhalt and a southern part which once was part of Saxony but had been annexed by Prussia in the 19th century. This historical origin can still be seen in the coat of arms of the federal state.

In April 1945 the US Army took control of most of the western and northern area of the future Saxony-Anhalt. The U.S. Group Control Council, Germany (a precursor of the OMGUS) appointed the first non-Nazi officials in leading positions in the area. Erhard Hübener, put on leave by the Nazis, was reappointed Landeshauptmann (state governor). By early July the US Army withdrew from the former Prussian Province of Saxony to make way for the Red Army to take it as part of the Soviet occupation zone, as agreed by the London Protocol in 1944.

On 9 July the Soviet SVAG ordered the merger of the Free State of Anhalt, Halle-Merseburg, the governorate of Magdeburg (in its then borders), Allstedt (before Thuringia) and some Brunswickian eastern exclaves and salients (Calvörde and the eastern part of the former Blankenburg district) with the Province of Saxony. The previously Saxon Erfurt governorate had become a part of Thuringia.

Anhalt takes its name from Anhalt Castle near Harzgerode; the origin of the name of the castle remains unknown. Anhalt was once an independent German federal state dating back centuries.

The SVAG appointed Hübener as president of the provincial Saxon administration, a newly created function. The administration was seated in Halle an der Saale, which became the capital, also of later Saxony-Anhalt until 1952. On 3 September 1945 the new administration enacted by Soviet-inspired ordinance the mass expropriations, mostly hitting holders of large real estates, often of noble descent.

On the occasion of the first (and one and only) election in the Soviet zone, allowing parties truly to compete for seats in provincial and state parliaments, on 20 October 1946, the Province of Saxony was renamed as the Province of Saxony-Anhalt (German: Provinz Sachsen-Anhalt), taking the prior merger into account. On 3 December 1946 the members of the new provincial parliament elected Hübener the first minister-president of Saxony-Anhalt, with the votes of the CDU and Liberal Democratic Party of Germany (LDPD). Thus he became the only governor in the Soviet zone who was not a member of the communist Socialist Unity Party of Germany (SED), making him an inconvenience for the Soviet forces.

After the official Allied decision to dissolve the Free State of Prussia, which had remained in limbo since the Prussian coup of 1932, its former provinces, in as far as they still existed, achieved statehood; thus the province emerged into the State of Saxony-Anhalt on 6 October 1947. It became part of the German Democratic Republic (East Germany) in 1949. From 1952 on, the East German states were dissolved, and Saxony-Anhalt's territory was divided into the East German districts of Halle and Magdeburg, except that the territory around Torgau was assigned to Leipzig. In 1990, in the course of German reunification, the districts were reintegrated as a state. The territory around Torgau did not return to the state and joined Saxony. Torgau is now the centre of the Nordsachsen district (since 2008).

In 2015 the skeletal remains of an ancient inhabitant of Karsdorf dated from the Early Neolithic (7200 BP) were analysed; he turned out to belong to the paternal T1a-M70 lineage and maternal lineage H1.

== Demographics ==
Historical population
Year	Pop.	±%
1990	2,873,957	—
1995	2,738,928	−4.7%
2000	2,615,375	−4.5%
2005	2,469,716	−5.6%
2011	2,287,040	−7.4%
2022	2,146,443	−6.1%

Since German reunification, there has been a continuous downward trend in the population of Saxony-Anhalt. This is partly due to outward migration and partly because the death rate exceeds the birth rate. Although the birth rate has been steady since 1994, the net reproduction rate is only approximately 70%. However, the total fertility rate reached 1.50 in 2014, the highest value since 1990.

=== Religion ===
Religion in Saxony-Anhalt – 2025
Religion	Percent
None or other	87.2%
EKD Protestants	9.9%
Roman Catholics	2.9%

The region has historically been associated with the Lutheran faith, but under Communist rule, church membership was strongly discouraged and much of the population disassociated itself from any religious body. Saxony-Anhalt contains many sites tied to Martin Luther's life, including Lutherstadt Eisleben and Lutherstadt Wittenberg.

Saxony-Anhalt is the most irreligious state in Germany. In 2025, 87.2% of the population was not religious or adhered to religions other than the Evangelical Church or Catholicism. 9.9% of the population belonged to the Protestant Church in Germany, the largest religious body, and 2.9% to the Roman Catholic Church.

2% were members of other religions (mostly Islam, Judaism, the New Apostolic Church and Mandeism). As of July 2019 there were 1,892 Jehovah's Witnesses (publishers) in Sachsen-Anhalt. Originally their branch office for Germany was in Magdeburg. When World War II ended in 1945, the property in Magdeburg, then part of East Germany, was returned and the branch was reestablished. But on 30 August 1950 Communist police stormed the facilities and arrested the workers, and the Jehovah's Witnesses in the German Democratic Republic (DDR) were banned.

=== Foreigners ===
The percentage of foreigners in Saxony-Anhalt was 4.9 percent by 31 December 2018, the third lowest among the 16 states of Germany (together with Saxony and Thuringia).

The largest foreign resident groups by 31 December 2023 were:

Nationality	Population (31 December 2022)	Population (31 December 2023)
Ukraine	34,678	33,760
Syria	21,240	28,805
Poland	13,257	14,155
Romania	8,243	10,910
Afghanistan	7,045	8,875
India	4,720	5,925
Turkey	4,285	5,800
Bulgaria	5,085	5,000
Russia	4,650	4,960
Vietnam	8,754	4,680

== Politics ==
=== Constitution ===
The constitution of Saxony-Anhalt was adopted by the Landtag of Saxony-Anhalt in 1992. It is divided into four main sections.

=== 2021 state election ===
In the 2021 state election, minister-president Reiner Haseloff of the CDU retained his position in a coalition with former partner SPD and newly the FDP. Before the election the coalition had consisted of the CDU, SPD and Greens.

Party	Constituency				Party list				Total seats	+/–
Party	Votes	%	+/–	Seats	Votes	%	+/–	Seats	Total seats	+/–
Christian Democratic Union (CDU)	362,333	34.13	+4.58	40	394,808	37.12	+7.37	0	40	+10
Alternative for Germany (AfD)	231,875	21.84	–1.28	1	221,498	20.82	–3.45	22	23	–2
The Left (LINKE)	135,419	12.76	–5.91	0	116,902	10.99	–5.33	12	12	–4
Social Democratic Party (SPD)	116,453	10.97	–3.32	0	89,475	8.41	–2.22	9	9	–2
Free Democratic Party (FDP)	70,725	6.66	+1.19	0	68,305	6.42	+1.56	7	7	+7
Alliance 90/The Greens (GRÜNE)	60,521	5.70	+0.42	0	63,148	5.94	+0.76	6	6	+1
Free Voters	57,536	5.42	+3.35	0	33,288	3.13	+0.97	0	0	±0
dieBasis	7,564	0.71	New	0	15,621	1.47	New	0	0	±0
Human Environment Animal Protection	1,056	0.10	+0.10	0	15,274	1.44	–0.04	0	0	±0
Garden Party	3,216	0.30	+0.08	0	8,577	0.81	+0.38	0	0	±0
Die PARTEI	3,909	0.37	+0.26	0	7,770	0.73	+0.20	0	0	±0
Animal Protection Here!	0	0.00	New	0	6,239	0.59	New	0	0	±0
Animal Protection Alliance	4,517	0.43	+0.19	0	5,108	0.48	–0.56	0	0	±0
Party for Health Research	0	0.00	New	0	3,947	0.37	New	0	0	±0
Pirate Party Germany	0	0.00	New	0	3,814	0.36	New	0	0	±0
National Democratic Party	160	0.02	+0.02	0	2,897	0.27	–1.62	0	0	±0
WiR2020	0	0.00	New	0	1,649	0.16	New	0	0	±0
Free Citizens of Central Germany	2,932	0.28	–0.16	0	1,603	0.15	–0.22	0	0	±0
The Humanists	0	0.00	New	0	1,409	0.13	New	0	0	±0
Ecological Democratic Party	145	0.01	New	0	1,062	0.10	New	0	0	±0
Climate List Saxony-Anhalt	0	0.00	New	0	827	0.08	New	0	0	±0
Liberal Conservative Reformers	0	0.00	±0.00	0	473	0.04	–0.83	0	0	±0
Independents	3,153	0.30	–0.10	0	0	0.00	0	0	0	±0
Total	1,061,514	100.00	–	41	1,063,694	100.00	–	56	97	–
Valid votes	1,061,514	98.35			1,063,694	98.56				
Invalid/blank votes	17,773	1.65			15,593	1.44				
Total votes	1,079,287	100.00			1,079,287	100.00				
Registered voters/turnout	1,788,955	60.33	–0.78		1,788,955	60.33	–0.78			
Source: State Returning Officer

Popular vote
CDU	37.12%
AfD	20.82%
LINKE	10.99%
SPD	8.41%
FDP	6.42%
GRÜNE	5.94%
FW	3.13%
Other	7.17%

Landtag seats
CDU	41.24%
AfD	23.71%
LINKE	12.37%
SPD	9.28%
FDP	7.22%
GRÜNE	6.19%

=== 2026 state election ===
A state election took place on 6 September 2026. The far-right AfD won a landslide victory, doubling its support placing first with 43.8% of the vote and winning the highest vote share for the far-right in Germany since 1945, although they narrowly missed an absolute majority of seats.

Party	Constituency				Party list				Total seats	+/–
Party	Votes	%	+/–	Seats	Votes	%	+/–	Seats	Total seats	+/–
Alternative for Germany (AfD)	581,945	44.33	▲22.49pp	38	576,037	43.79	▲22.97pp	1	39	▲16
Christian Democratic Union (CDU)	314,535	23.96	▼10.17pp	0	226,622	17.23	▼19.89pp	15	15	▼25
Social Democratic Party (SPD)	102,881	7.84	▼3.14pp	0	122,303	9.30	▲0.89pp	8	8	▼1
Alliance 90/The Greens (Grüne)	45,310	3.45	▼2.25pp	0	117,498	8.93	▲3.00pp	8	8	▲2
The Left (Linke)	157,905	12.03	▼0.73pp	3	112,541	8.56	▼2.44pp	5	8	▼4
Sahra Wagenknecht Alliance (BSW)	41,782	3.18	New	0	69,291	5.27	New	5	5	▲5
Free Democratic Party (FDP)	41,113	3.13	▼3.53pp	0	33,969	2.58	▼3.84pp	0	0	▼7
Free Voters (FW)	14,464	1.10	▼4.32pp	0	15,430	1.17	▼1.96pp	0	0	−
Human Environment Animal Protection Party (Tierschutzpartei)	1,129	0.09	▼0.01pp	0	14,356	1.09	▼0.34pp	0	0	−
Garden Party (Gartenpartei)	2,937	0.22	▼0.08pp	0	7,482	0.57	▼0.24pp	0	0	−
Animal Protection Alliance (Tierschutzallianz)	999	0.08	▼0.35pp	0	7,283	0.55	▲0.07pp	0	0	−
Volt	768	0.06	New	0	4,339	0.33	New	0	0	New
Die PARTEI	777	0.06	▼0.31pp	0	3,487	0.27	▼0.47pp	0	0	−
Party of Progress (PdF)	2,680	0.20	New	0	2,778	0.21	New	0	0	New
Grassroots Democratic Party of Germany (dieBasis)					1,899	0.14	▼1.32pp	0	0	−
Die Heimat	325	0.02	−	0					0	−
Independents	3,184	0.24	▼0.05pp	0					0	−
Total	1,312,734	100.00	–	41	1,315,315	100.00	–	42	83	▼14
Valid votes	1,312,734	98.83	▲0.46pp		1,315,315	99.03	▲0.45pp			
Invalid/blank votes	15,477	1.17	▼0.46pp		12,896	0.97	▼0.45pp			
Total votes	1,328,211	100.00	–		1,328,211	100.00	–			
Registered voters/turnout	1,706,851	77.82	▲17.50pp		1,706,851	77.82	▲17.50pp			
Source: Statistisches Landesamt Sachsen-Anhalt

Popular vote
AfD	43.79%
CDU	17.23%
SPD	9.30%
GRÜNE	8.93%
LINKE	8.56%
BSW	5.27%
FDP	2.58%
Other	4.34%

Landtag seats
AfD	46.99%
CDU	18.07%
SPD	9.64%
GRÜNE	9.64%
LINKE	9.64%
BSW	6.02%

== Economy ==
The gross domestic product (GDP) of the state was 62.7 billion euros in 2018, which accounts for 1.9% of Germany's total economic output and ranks 13th among the 16 German states. GDP per capita adjusted for purchasing power was 26,000 euros or 86% of the EU27 average in the same year. The GDP per employee was 88% of the EU average. The GDP per capita was the second lowest of all German states.

By 2020, the GDP of the state dropped to 62.654 billion euros, shortly after reaching an all-time high of 64.115 billion euros in 2019.

=== Development ===
Saxony-Anhalt was part of the communist German Democratic Republic. After the breakdown of communism and the German reunification in 1990, the collapse of non-competitive former GDR industries temporarily caused severe economic problems. In 2000, Saxony-Anhalt had the highest unemployment rate of all German states, at 20.2%.

However, the process of economic transformation towards a modern market economy seems to be completed. Massive investments in modern infrastructure have taken place since 1990, and the remaining and newly created businesses are highly competitive. For example, the industry has doubled its share of international revenue from 13 percent in 1995 to 26 percent in 2008. Meanwhile, the unemployment rate has fallen considerably. By 2010 the GDP of Saxony-Anhalt was almost two and a half times higher than it was in 1991.

Even though part of this recovery was brought on by the positive performance of the German economy, Saxony-Anhalt not only followed the national trend, but clearly outperformed other German states. For example, it outperformed three German states in terms of unemployment (10.8%, as of September 2011): the German capital and city-state of Berlin (12.7%), the city-state Free Hanseatic City of Bremen (11.3%) and Mecklenburg-Western Pomerania (11%).

The unemployment began to fall under 10% in 2016, and stood at 7.1% in October 2018. It has since risen to 8.3% in 2026, 2 percentage points above the national average.

Year	2000	2001	2002	2003	2004	2005	2006	2007	2008	2009	2010	2011	2012	2013	2014	2015	2016	2017
Unemployment rate in %	20.2	19.7	19.6	20.5	20.3	20.2	18.3	15.9	13.9	13.6	12.5	11.6	11.5	11.2	10.7	10.2	9.6	8.4

=== Structure ===
- The chemical industry is quite important, with almost 25,500 employees across 214 plants in 2010. One of the biggest chemical producing areas can be found around the city of Bitterfeld-Wolfen. Because of the chemical industry, Saxony-Anhalt attracts more foreign direct investments than any other state in eastern Germany.
- The state is the location of numerous wind farms producing wind-turbine energy.
- Saxony-Anhalt is also famous for its good soil. Hence, the food industry has an important role with almost 19,500 employees across 190 plants in 2010. Some of the best known products are Baumkuchen from Salzwedel and Halloren chocolate globes from Germany's oldest chocolate factory in Halle.

=== Tourism ===
Saxony-Anhalt has six World Heritage Sites, the highest number of all states in Germany. The Nebra Sky Disc is also part of the UNESCO document heritage Register "Memory of the World."

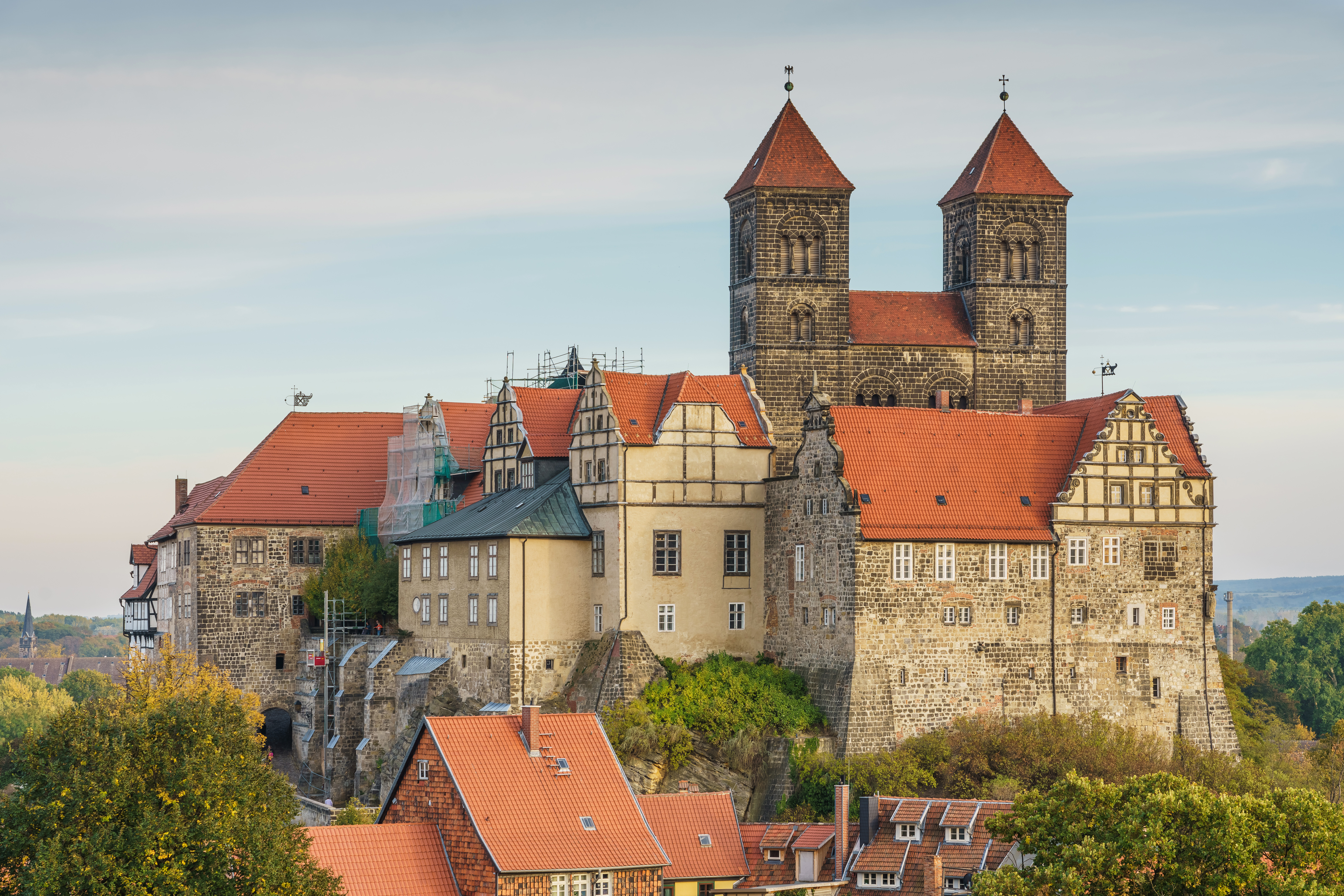
Collegiate church, castle, and the old town of Quedlinburg

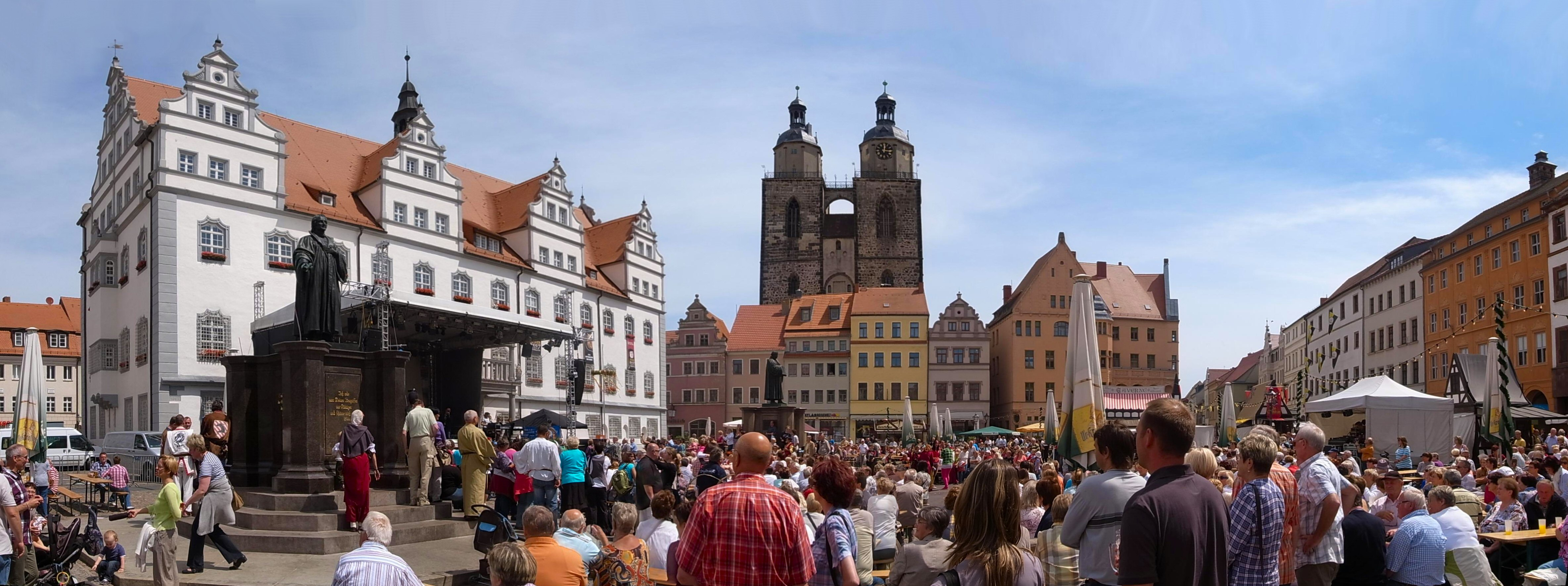
Luther memorials in Wittenberg

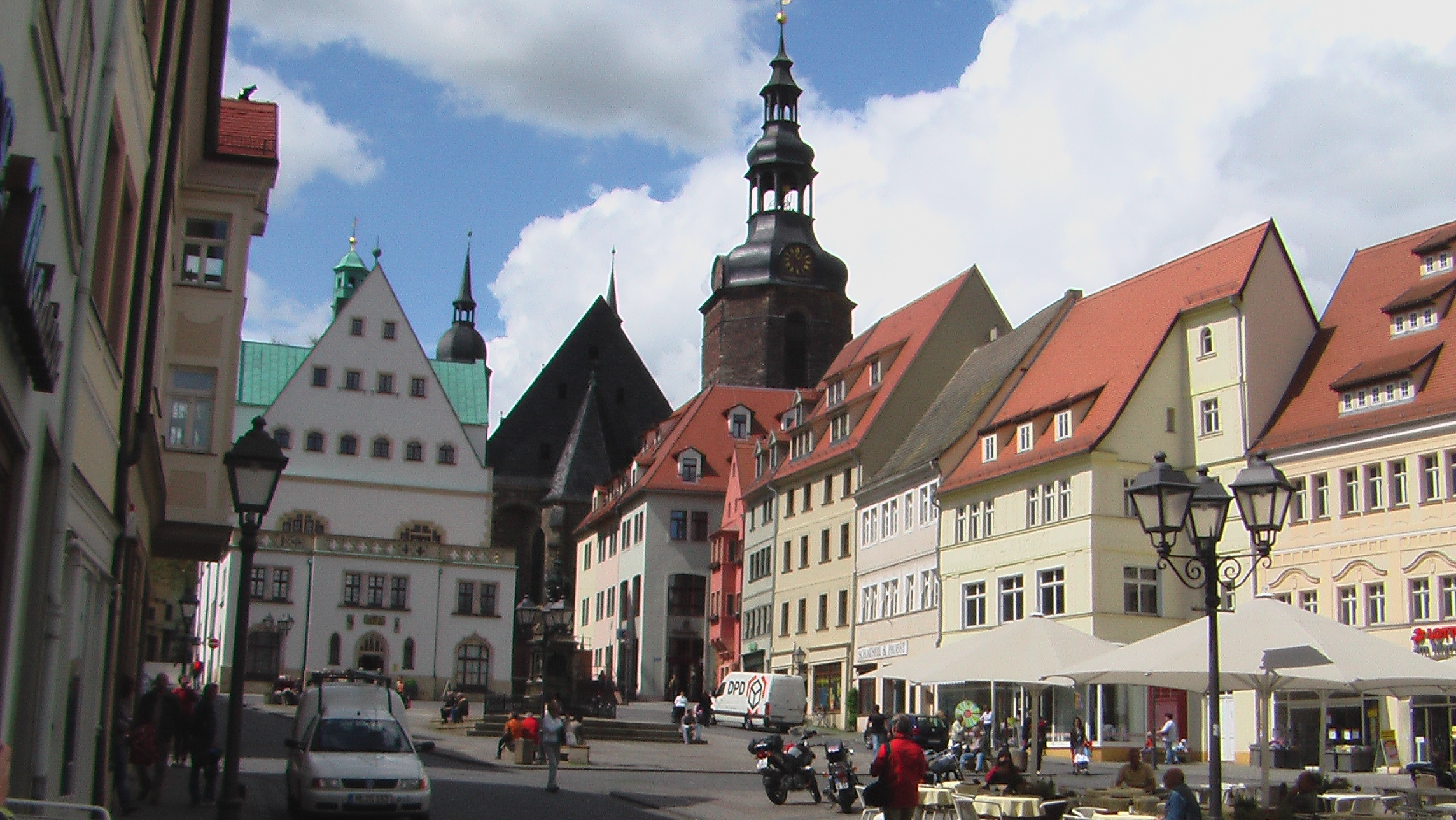
Luther memorials in Eisleben

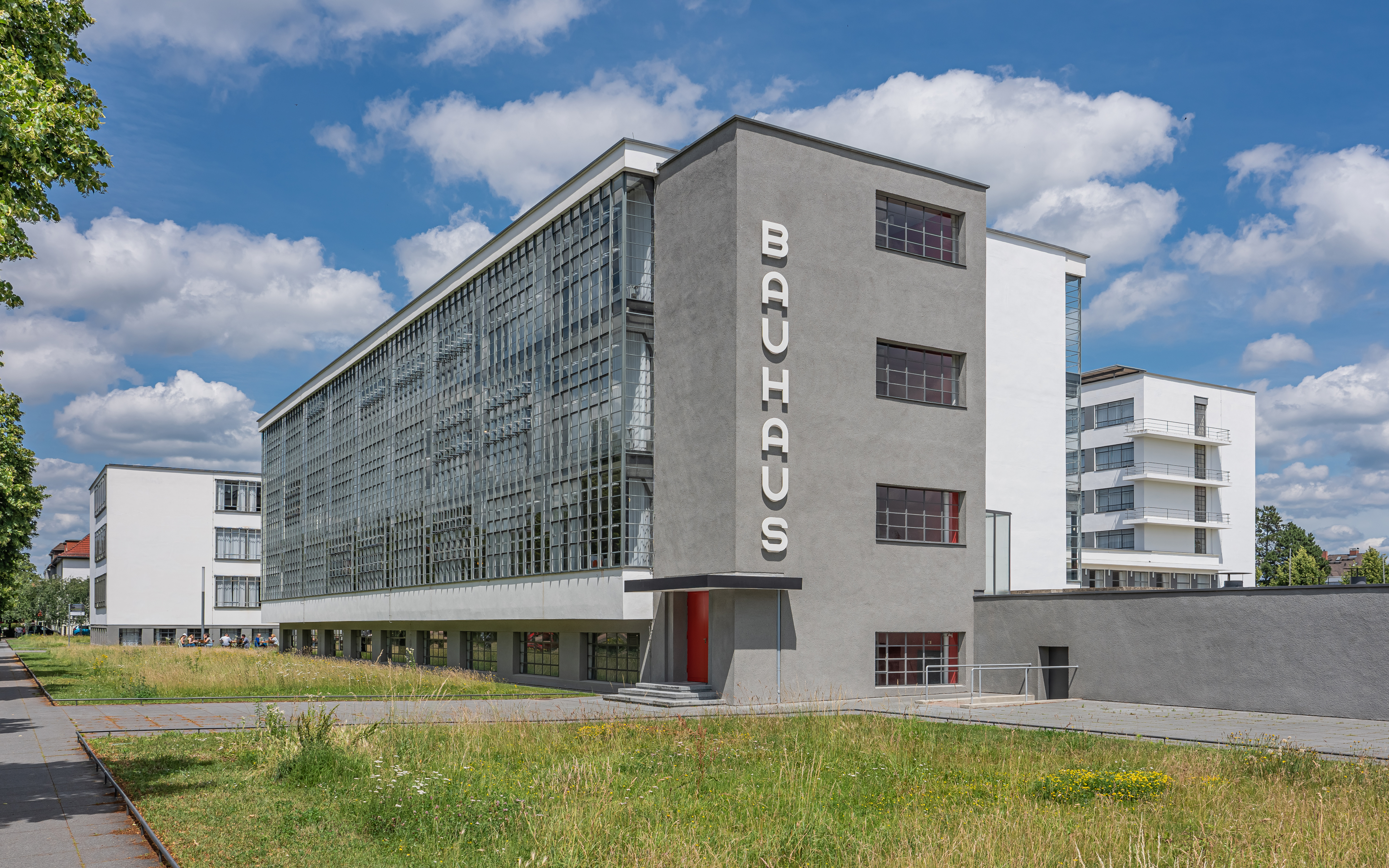
Bauhaus Dessau

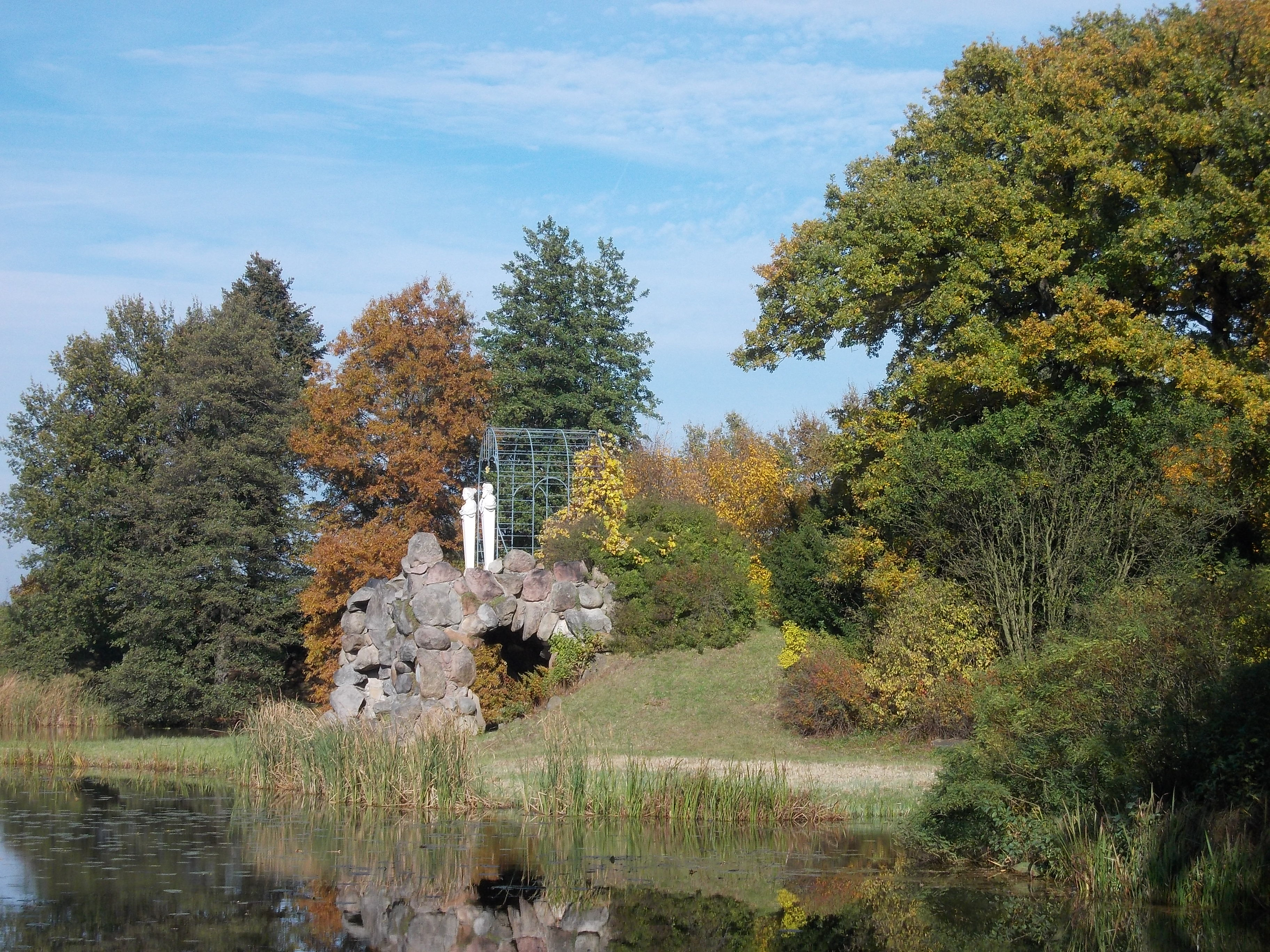
Dessau-Wörlitz Garden Realm

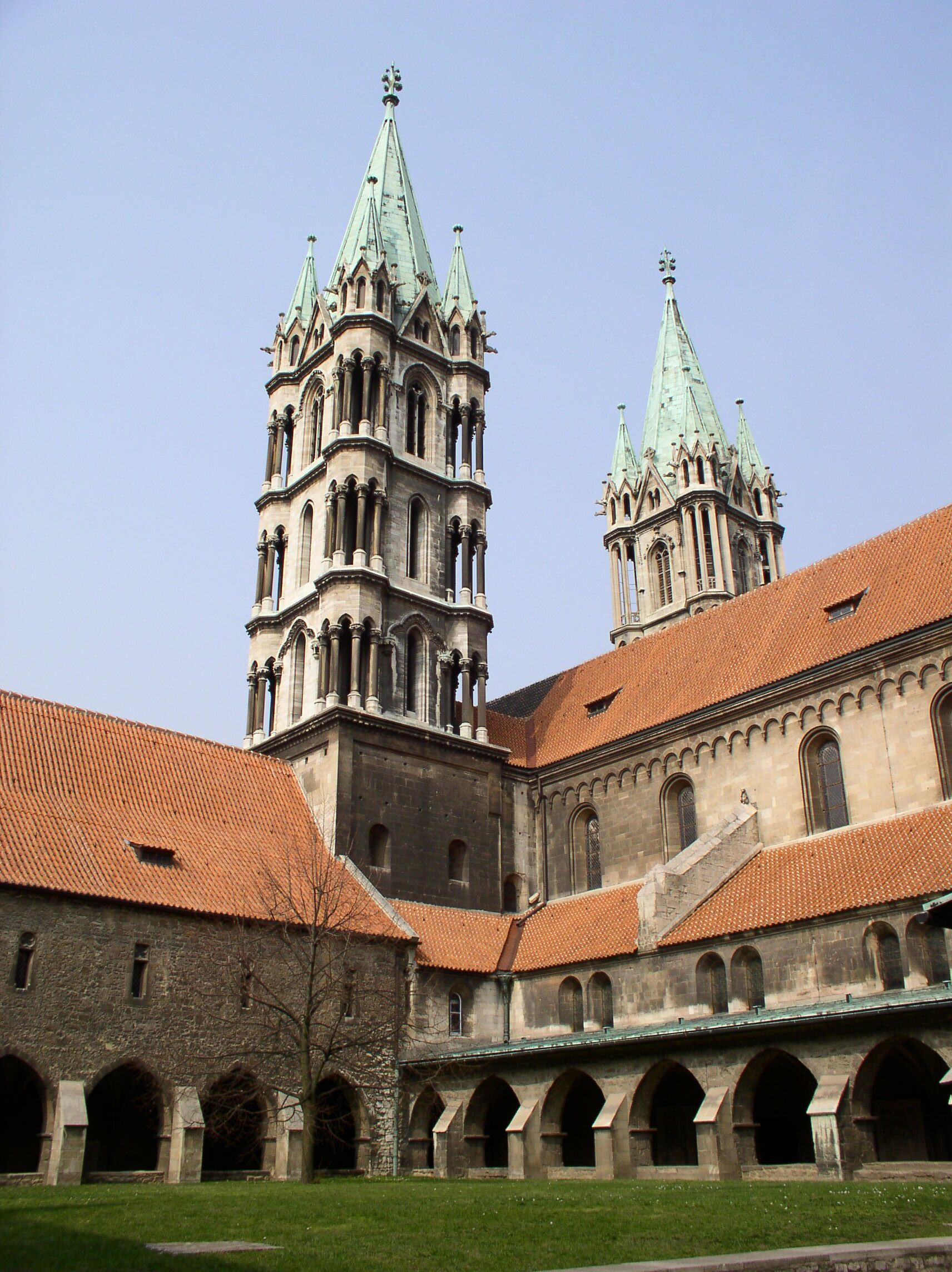
Naumburg Cathedral

== Transport ==
There are some bicycle routes with international and national Status.

- Eurovelo
  - EV2 The Capitals Route
  - EV7 The Sun Route
  - EV13 The Iron Curtain Trail
- German Cycling Network
  - D10 Elbe Cycle Route (Elberadweg)
  - D11 Baltic Sea to Upper Bavaria Route (Ostsee–Oberbayern)
  - Radweg Deutsche Einheit (cycleway german unity)

The region's international commercial airport is Leipzig/Halle Airport which provides flights to other parts of Germany and other European destinations. The airport also serves as the main European hub for cargo flights operated by DHL Aviation and the main hub for AeroLogic.

== Education ==
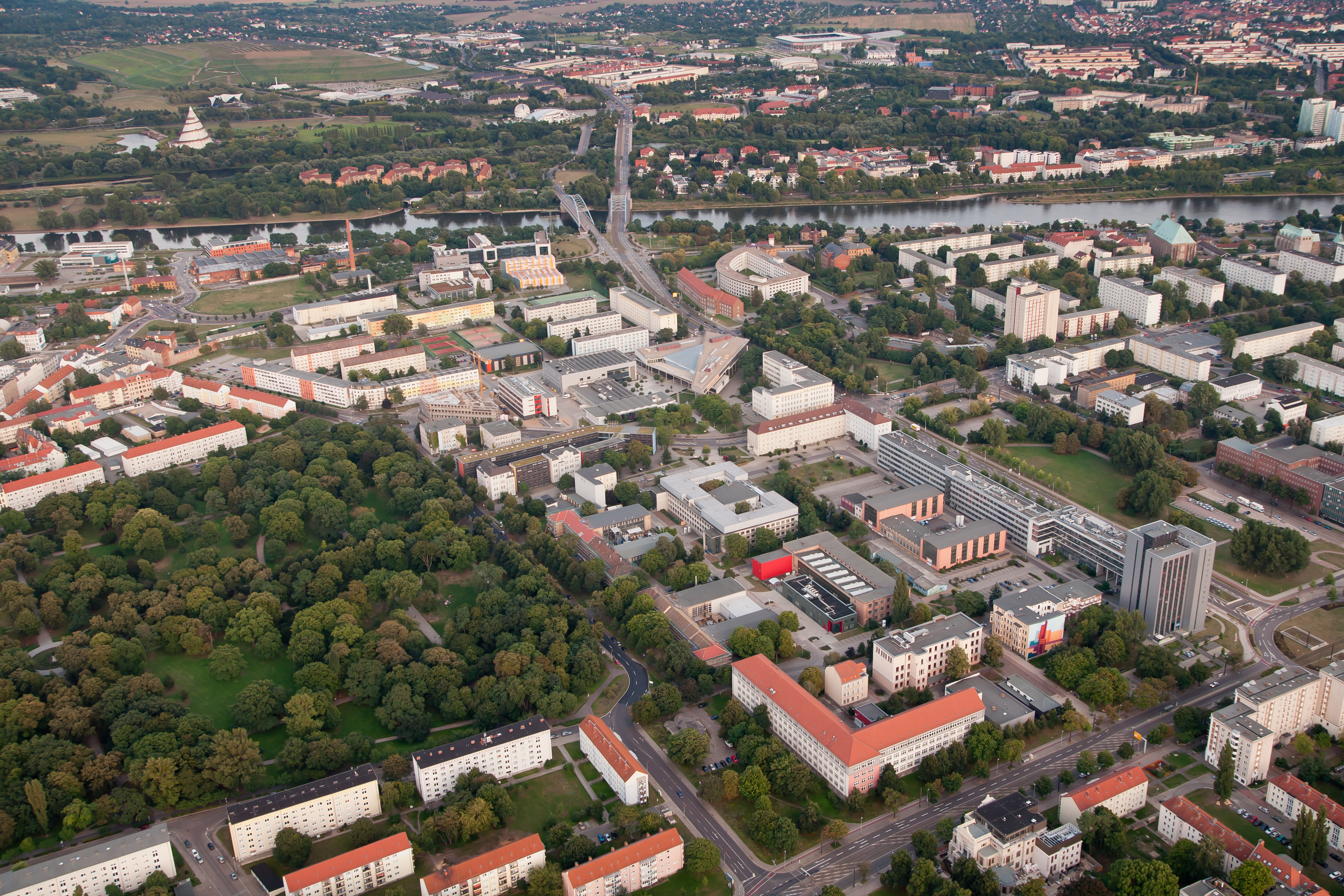
Aerial view of the main campus in Magdeburg

Saxony-Anhalt has several universities, including:

- Anhalt University of Applied Sciences
- Harz University of Applied Studies
- Magdeburg-Stendal University of Applied Sciences
- Martin Luther University of Halle-Wittenberg
- Merseburg University of Applied Sciences
- Otto von Guericke University Magdeburg

== Anthem ==
- "Lied für Sachsen-Anhalt" ("Song for Saxony-Anhalt")
- Motto: "Land of the Early Risers"

== See also ==
- Duchy of Anhalt
- Outline of Germany
