= Michael Cramer =

Michael Cramer may refer to:

- Michael Cramer (politician) (born 1949), German politician and Member of the European Parliament
- Michael Cramer (actor) (1930–2000), German actor
- Michael J. Cramer (diplomat), American diplomat
- Michael W. Cramer (born 1943), U.S. Navy rear admiral and former director of the Office of Naval Intelligence
