= Lied für Sachsen-Anhalt =

Regional anthem of Saxony-Anhalt, Germany

The Lied für Sachsen-Anhalt (Song for Saxony-Anhalt) is a regional anthem of the German state of Saxony-Anhalt. The use of this anthem was encouraged by the first minister-president of the country to strengthen the feeling of cultural identity in the new-founded state.

== Lyrics ==
Dieses Lied geh allen Herzen ein,
die für Harz und Fläming glühn,
auch die Elbe soll uns Heimat sein,
Sachsen-Anhalt stolz und kühn

Ob die Saat uns grünt im Bördeland
und die Saalekirschen blühn,
das liegt auch in unsrer eignen Hand,
Sachsen-Anhalt stolz und kühn

Wollen wir nun eine Heimat baun
müssen wir uns dafür mühn,
eine gute Heimat ohne Zaun,
Sachsen-Anhalt stolz und kühn

Dass im Unstruttal der Wein gedeiht
und die Wälder stehen grün,
dass die Hoffnung uns die Kraft verleiht,
Sachsen-Anhalt stolz und kühn

Translation:

This song may touch all hearts,
that glow for Harz and Fläming hills,
also Elbe river shall be our home,
Saxony-Anhalt proud and bold

Whether seeds grow in the Bördeland
and Saale cherries be in bloom,
all this lies in our hands,
Saxony-Anhalt proud and bold

If we want to build a home
we must toil for it,
a good home without a fence,
Saxony-Anhalt proud and bold

When the wine grows in the Unstrut valley
and the forests standing green,
hope provides us with strength,
Saxony-Anhalt proud and bold
