= Berliner Mauerweg =

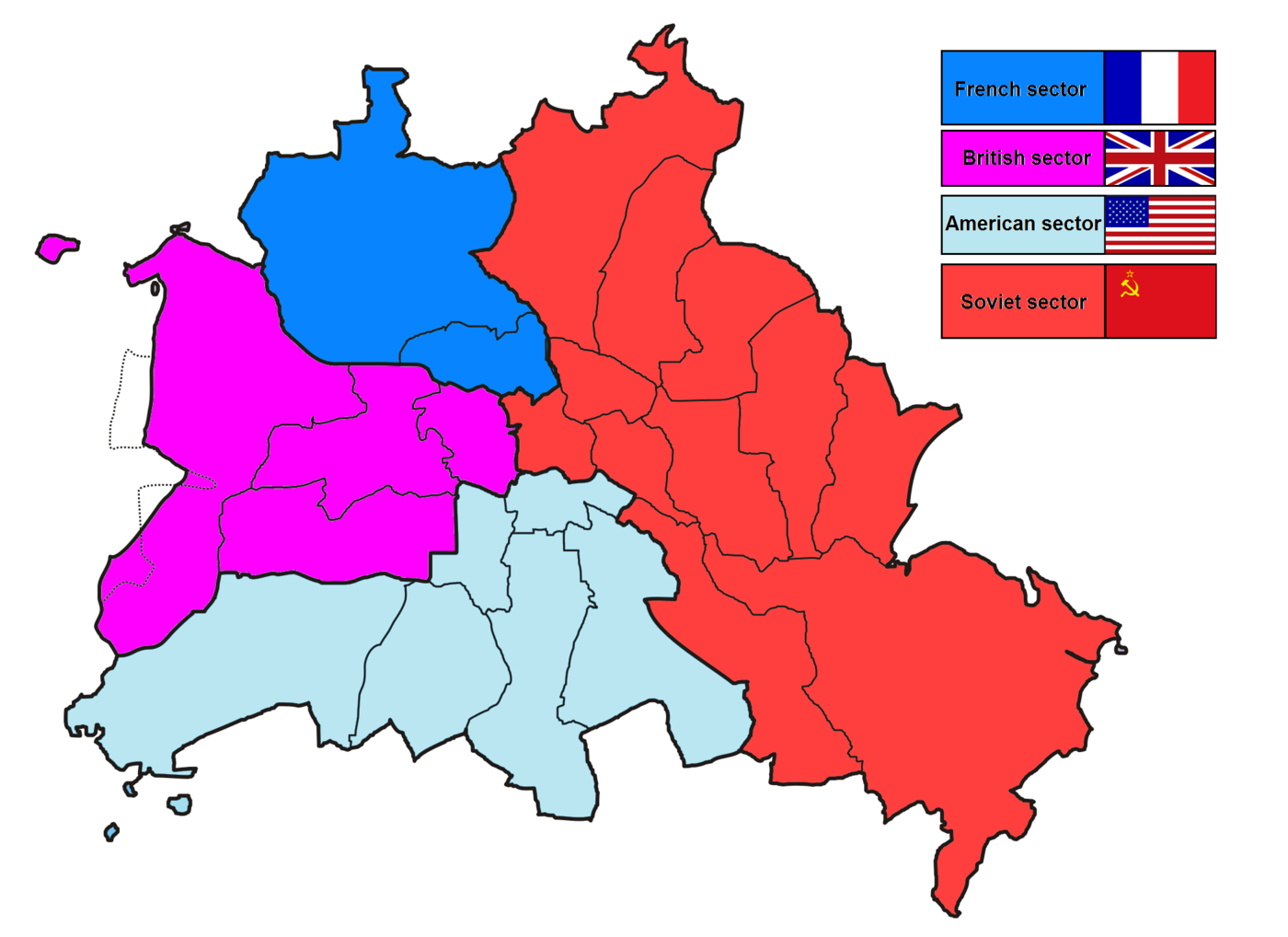
A map showing the city of Berlin between 1945 and 1990. The Soviet, French, British and American sectors are identified, and outlines of districts are shown.

The Berlin Wall Trail (or mauerweg in German) is an approximately 160-kilometre-long cycle and pedestrian hiking trail which takes the course of the Berlin Wall. The route was championed by Michael Cramer, a member of the Green Party in of Berlin's Abgeordnetenhaus (House of Representatives) and opened in 2004. Cyclists and pedestrians can follow a double row of cobblestones that have the metal plaque inscribed with "Berliner Mauer 1961-1989". The wall runs along the former post path of the border troops of the GDR.

== Historical Background ==
After the end of World War two, the capital Berlin was subdivided between the four allied powers and white lines on the asphalt split the city into four sectors.

- France - (NW),
- England - (W)
- USA - (SW)
- USSR - (E)

The three allied powers on the western side of the city, use former administrative boundaries as reference points. Ten enclaves are part of the Federal Republic, and receive Marshall Aid from the USA. While on the eastern side of Berlin, the German Democratic Republic (GDR) is transformed (under Stalinism) into a workers and peasant state.

On August 13, 1961, East German border troops sealed off the eastern part of Berlin from the western sectors. What begins as a barbed-wire barrier quickly grows into a wall with a death strip, that runs right through the city. On the he 9 November 1989, the border was accidentally re-opened when Günter Schabowski, announced in front of the media, that East German citizens could apply for permission to travel abroad without having to meet the previous requirements for those trips. As a result, thousands of East Berliners began proceeding to the six border crossings along the Berlin Wall and demanded to be let through.

== Berlin Re-united ==
On 1 July 1990, an economic and monetary union of the two German states and the complete dismanting of border controls and barriers began. The patrol paths,became freely accessible along almost its entire length. Initiatives were launched by environmentalists and cycling associations preserve and restore the open spaces along the undeveloped strip of land surrounding West Berlin. While local residents and municipal representatives had concerns about public safety and preferred the rapid demolition of the pathway. The wall and the patrol strip were built over, especially in the inner city. From 2000, Interest in preserving the site grew and annual "Wall walks" became a common practice. Access to the Mauerweg still remains contested, although cyclists (from 2007) are now permitted to follow the trail.

== Points of Interest ==
=== Checkpoint Charlie ===
Checkpoint C (better known as Checkpoint Charlie) on Friedrichstraße was the most renowned Berlin Wall crossing point, since it was used by diplomats and foreigners who needed to cross to East Berlin.

=== Potsdamer Platz ===
The Berlin Wall was built along Ebertstraße and a tip of land, belonging to the GDR was cut off. Lenné Dreieck became a triangle of no mans land, situated between the Soviet, British and American sectors.

=== Bernauer Straße ===
Bernauer Straße was a dividing line between two communities. This memorial follows its route and combines a green park, a walkway, wall memorials and a documentation/visitor centre. A reconstructed border fortifications can also be seen from the centre.

=== Invalidenstraße ===
Invalidenstraße had a border crossing on the Berlin–Spandau Shipping Canal. It was at Humboldt harbour where Günter Litfin hopped into the canal, on the 24 August 1961. He was shot, attempting to escape. It was also on Invalidenstraße, on the 9th of November, 1989, that a handful of West Berliners entered into East Berlin and stormed the Brandenburg Gate.

== Sustainability ==
The ongoing maintenance, upgrades and development of the Berliner Mauerweg has been contentious and funding (at times) has been insufficient. Budget lines have ensured that €12.39 million is available until 2026. With 90% provided by the Department for Economics, Energy and Public Enterprises and 90% provided by the Department for Mobility, Transport, Climate Protection and the Environment.
