= Kattegattleden =

Long-distance cycling route in Sweden

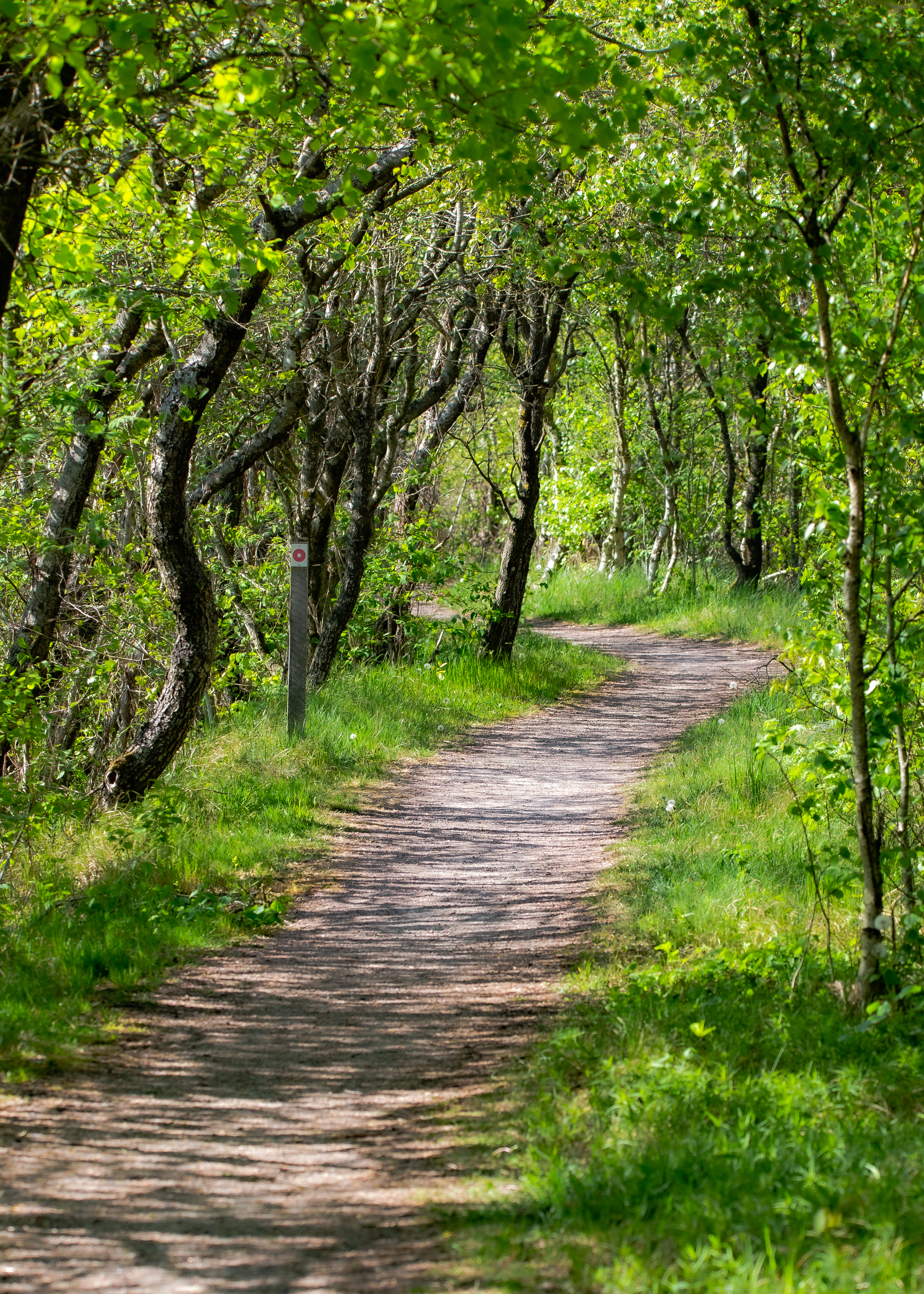

Kattegattleden is a 370 kilometer long-distance cycling route from Helsingborg to Gothenburg.

It was inaugurated June 2015 as a cooperation between Region Halland, Region Skåne and Trafikverket.

The route is included in the European Cyclists' Federation's network of cycleways that are part of EuroVelo 7, linking North Cape to Malta.
