= Elbe Cycle Route =

Tourism in Germany

Coordinates: 53.8917°N 8.6821°E

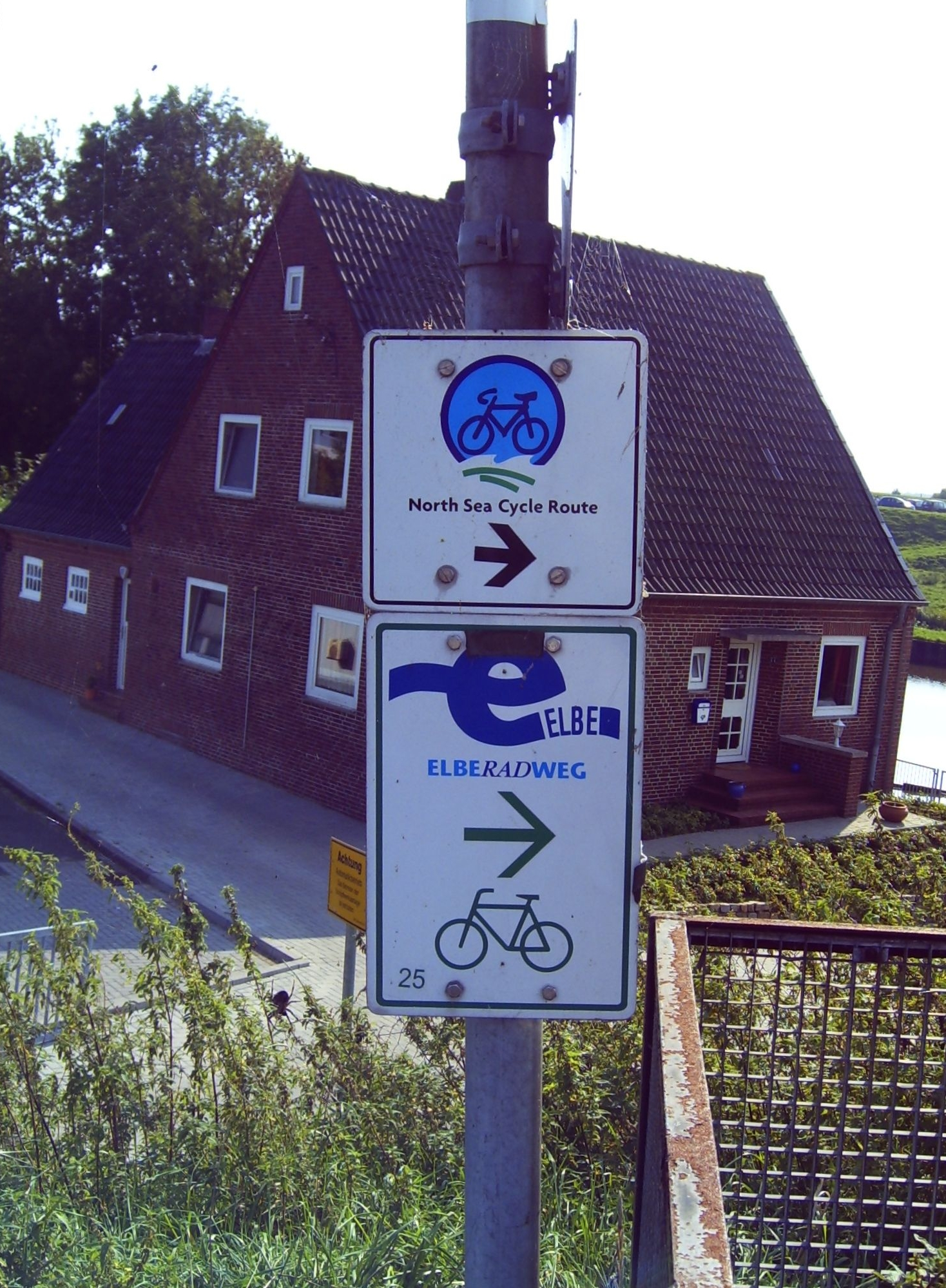
Elbe Cycle Route sign at the harbour in Glückstadt

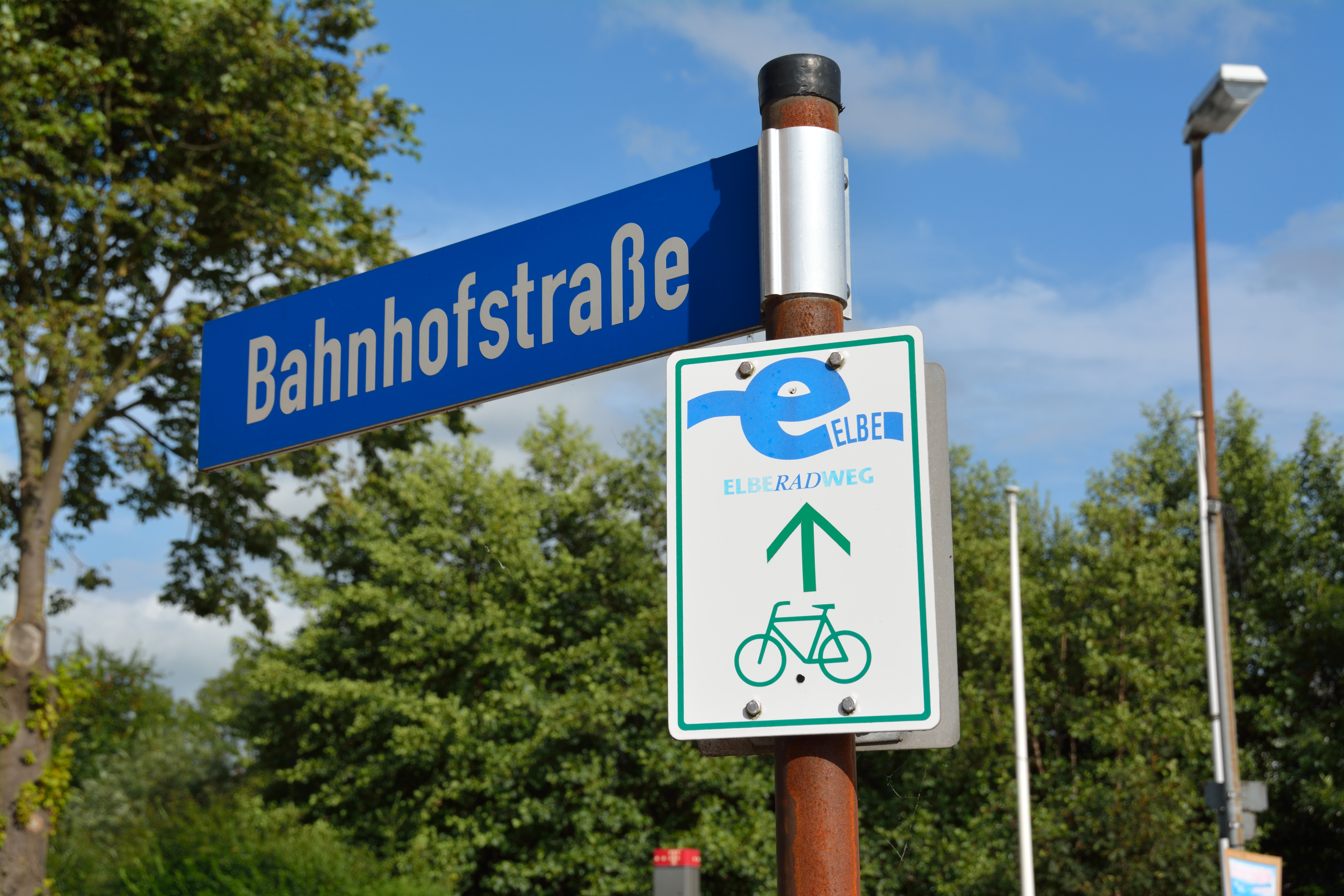
Elbe Cycle Route sign in Brunsbüttel

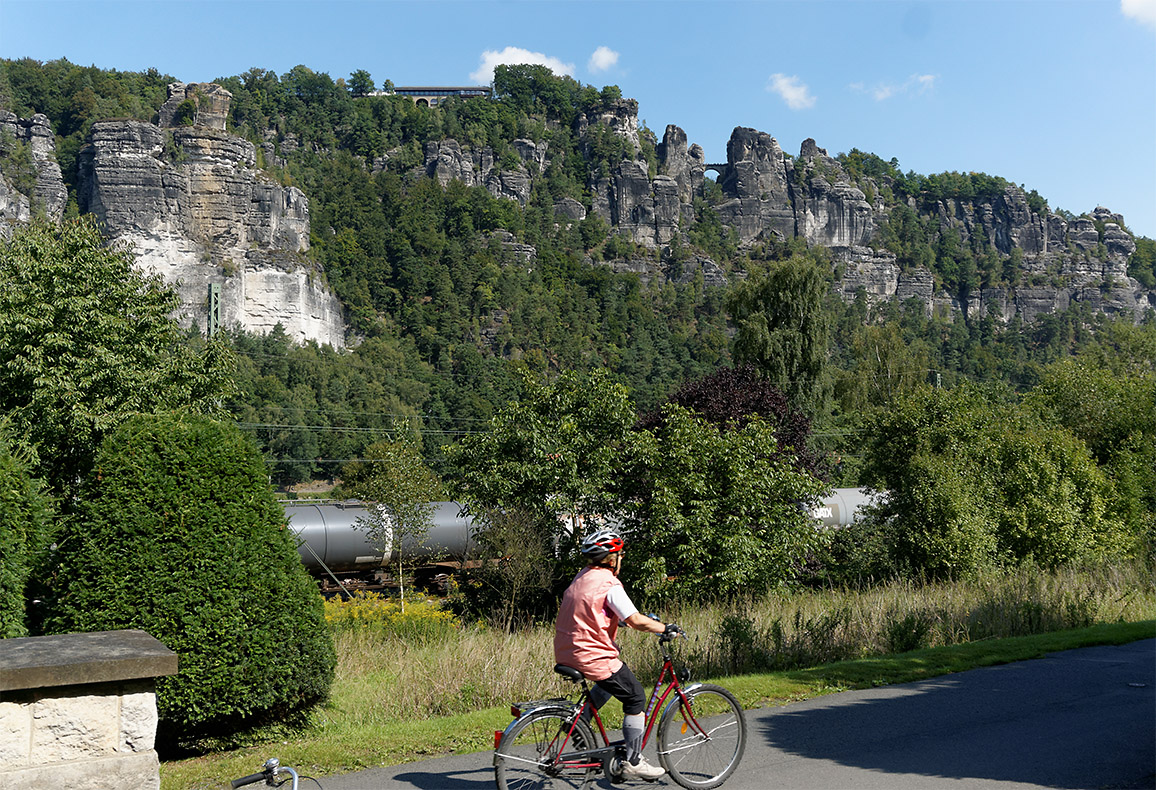
Rock formation Bastei in Saxon Switzerland

The Elbe Cycle Route (Elberadweg in German) is part of an international network of cycling routes all over Europe. It is integrated in the system of currently 37 river cycling routes in Germany and by far the most popular route for cyclists in this country.

The Elbe Cycle Route starts in Špindlerův Mlýn in the Giant Mountains. It then runs for about 1220 km until it ends in Cuxhaven at the North Sea. Part of it falls together with the EV7 of the EuroVelo network. One variety of the route starts in Prague, following the river Vltava to the Elbe.

After a fairly adventurous part of the Route on the Czech side of the river one reaches the famous Elbe Sandstone Mountains in Bohemian Switzerland and Saxon Switzerland and crosses the border to Germany. Shortly after this the Route leads through, Dresden and later through other cities like Meißen, Lutherstadt Wittenberg, Dessau, Magdeburg, Tangermünde, Lauenburg, Hamburg, Cuxhaven.

There are many small villages with old churches and other interesting sites along the way. A lot of restaurants and pensions offer their service to the weary after a day of cycling.

One of the other reasons however for its popularity is probably the fact that there are no significant level changes from Dresden on. It is practically downhill all the way from Dresden to Cuxhaven while the other direction mostly offers slight tailwinds.

The Elbe Cycling Route is marked throughout Germany with a special sign.

== See also ==
- EV7 The Sun Route
