= Berlin-Copenhagen Cycle Route =

Cycling route in Germany and Denmark

Coordinates: 52°30′59″N 13°22′40″E

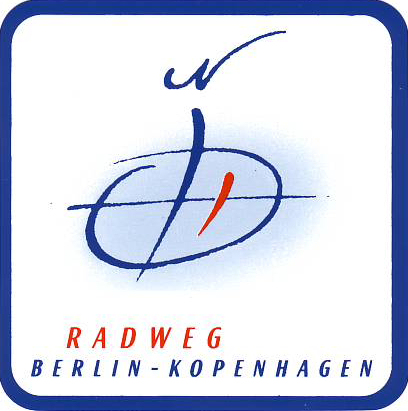
Logo Berlin-Copenhagen Cycle Route

The Berlin–Copenhagen Cycle Route (German: Radfernweg Berlin-Kopenhagen) is a 650 km (400 mi) long-distance cycling route that connects the German and Danish capital cities. The German portion of the route, between Berlin and Rostock, is approximately 335 km (208 mi); the Danish portion, between Gedser and Copenhagen, is approximately 315 km (196 mi). Between Rostock and Gedser, cyclists must take a ferry.

The Berlin–Copenhagen Cycle Route is part of the 6,000 km (3,700 mi) EuroVelo 7 cycling route, which runs from the top of Norway to the island of Malta in the Mediterranean Sea. It also forms part of the German Cycling Network's D-Route 11, which runs from the Bavarian Alps to the Baltic Sea.

== Route ==
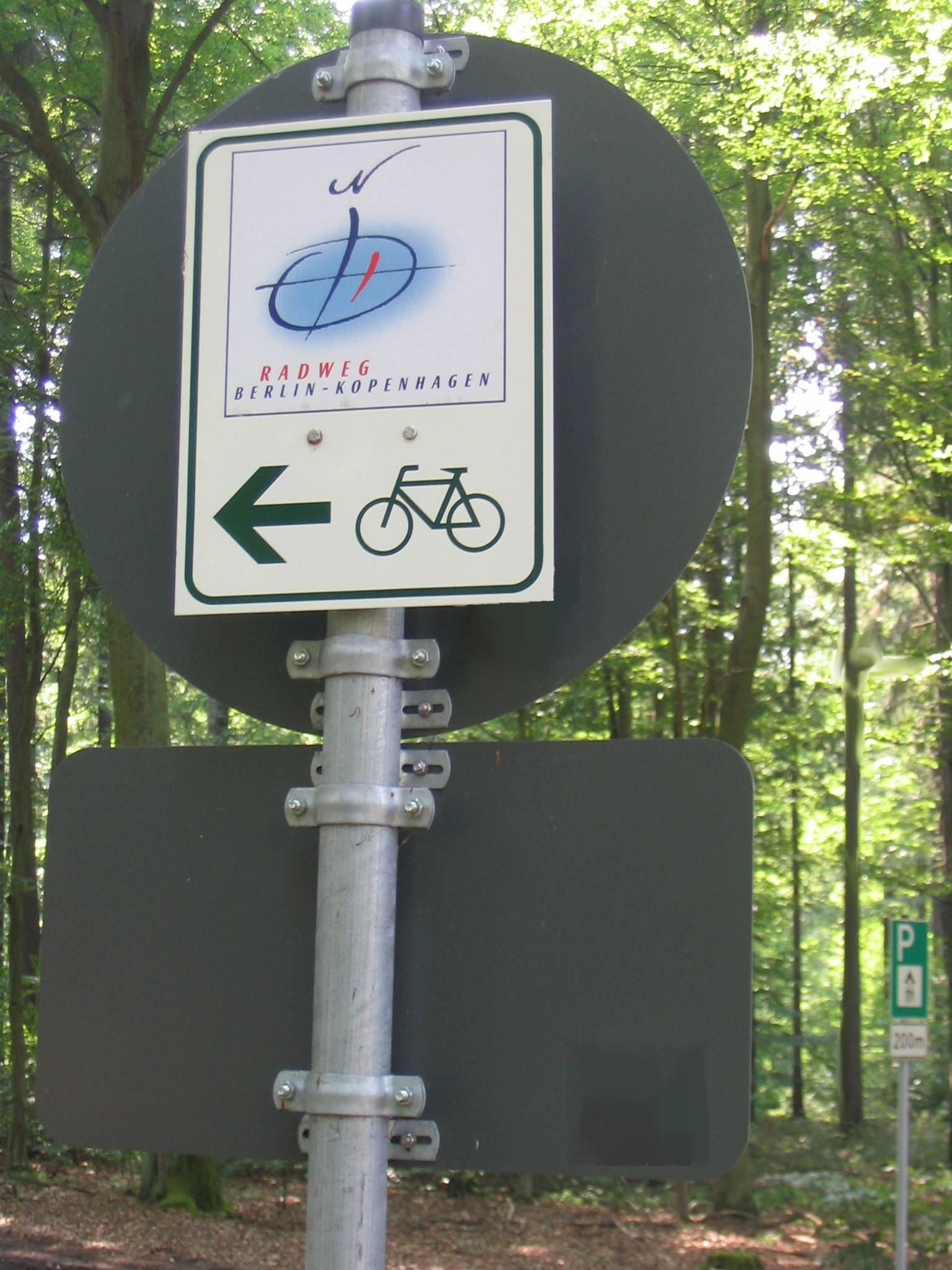
Signpost near Altglobsow in Brandenburg

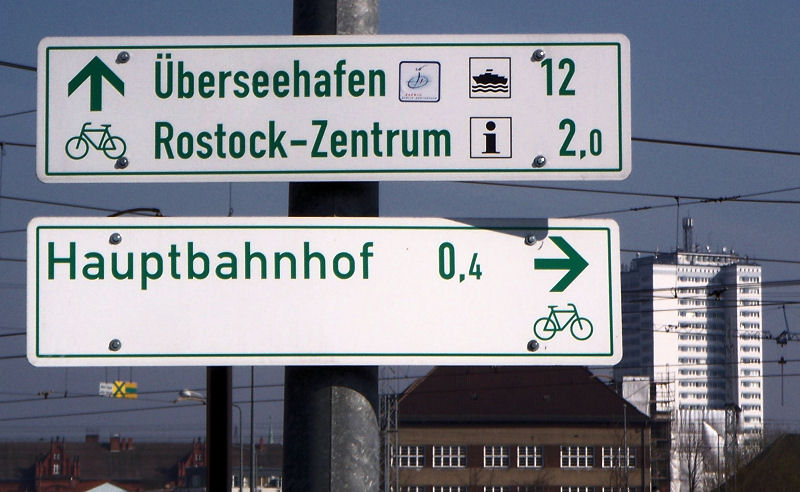
Signpost in Rostock

The route is paved for the majority of its length, sometimes running on a road with automobiles, but most of the time its own path, which may or may not run parallel to an auto road. A very few stretches of the route, for example between Neustrelitz and Waren, are not paved but perfectly acceptable to ride over with an average road or hybrid bicycle. Under certain weather conditions these unpaved roads might require special attention while riding over. Distinctive signs mark the route at most junctions but acquiring a route map to keep on the journey or a GPS navigation device loaded with the route (available through the official site) is recommended.

In Denmark, the path is fully signposted as National Route 9, with red N9 on a blue background. The ferry across the Grønsund runs only during the summer, about 15 May to 15 September, and during a short period in October.

== See also ==
- EuroVelo 7
- German Cycling Network
