= Michael Cramer (politician) =

German politician (born 1949)

Michael Cramer MEP
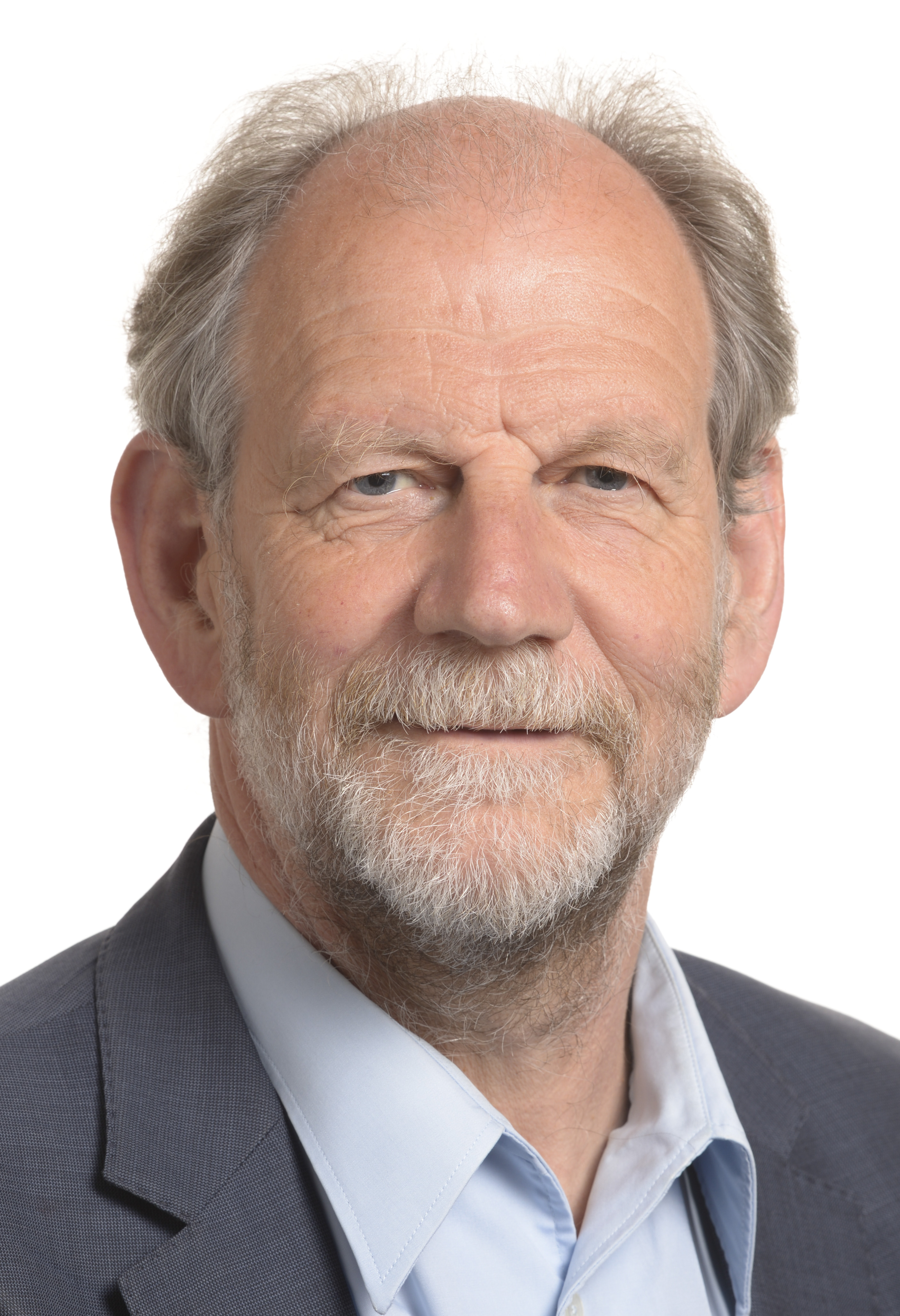
- Cramer in 2014

Member of the European Parliament
- In office 20 July 2004 – 2019
- Constituency: Germany

Personal details
- Born: 16 June 1949 (age 77) Gevelsberg, Germany
- Party: German; Alliance 90/The Greens; EU; European Green Party
- Website: www.michael-cramer.eu

Michael Cramer (born 16 June 1949) is a German politician who served as Member of the European Parliament (MEP) from 2004 until 2019. He is a member of the Alliance 90/The Greens, part of the European Green Party.

Originally, Cramer came to Berlin to be a teacher. From 1989 to 2004 Cramer was a Member of the Abgeordnetenhaus of Berlin, mainly working on Berlin's transport policy, and served as spokesman for transportation issues for Alliance 90/The Greens in Berlin. In 2004 Cramer was first elected to the European Parliament, and was re-elected in 2009 for the Green Party. Cramer was a member of the European Parliament's Committee on Transport and Tourism and between 2014 and 2017 chairperson of that committee. He was part of the Parliament's delegation to the 2008 United Nations Climate Change Conference in Poznań, Poland.

Cramer gives regular tours along the former route of the Berlin Wall; he was one of the members of the Abgeordnetenhaus to push for the Berlin Wall Trail, a memorial trail with steles and explanations along the former Wall. He is also the founder of the Iron Curtain Trail, a project to complete a long-distance cycling route following the old border of the Iron Curtain in Europe.

In 2018, Cramer announced that he would not stand in the 2019 European elections but instead resign from active politics by the end of the parliamentary term.

== See also ==
- Iron Curtain Trail
