= EV7 The Sun Route =

Long-distance cycling route in Europe

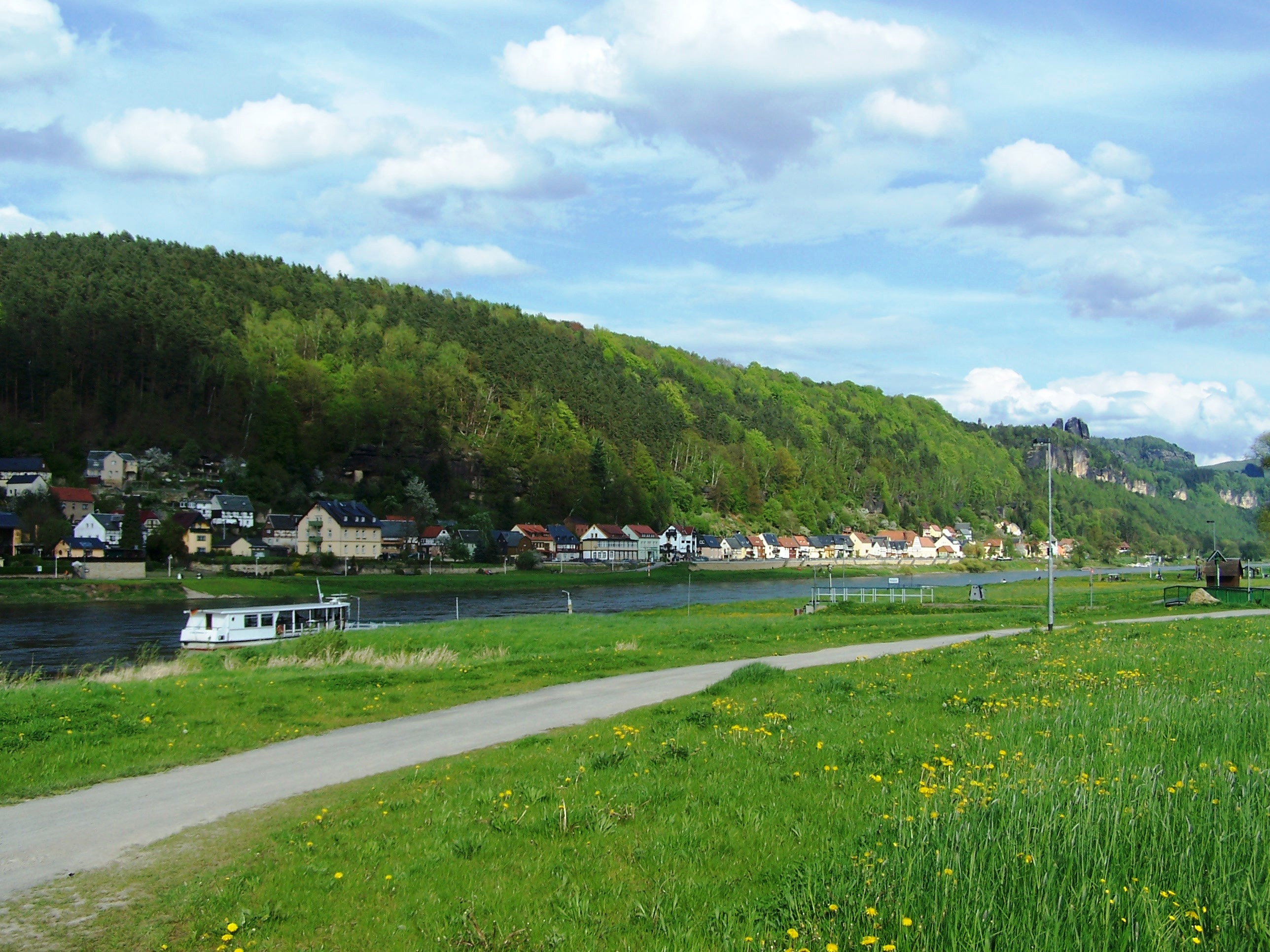
- Route in the east of Germany
- Length: 7,400 km (4,600 mi)
- Designation: European Cyclists' Federation
- Trailheads: North Cape, Norway to Malta
- Use: cycling
- Website: http://www.eurovelo.com/en/eurovelos/eurovelo-7
Trail map

Map of the EuroVelo 7 route

EuroVelo 7 (EV7), named the Sun Route, is a 7,409 km (4,604 mi) long EuroVelo long-distance cycling route running north–south through the whole of Europe from the North Cape in Norway to the island of Malta in the Mediterranean Sea. The route passes through nine countries, and from north to south these are: Norway, Finland, Sweden, Denmark, Germany, Czech Republic, Austria, Italy, Malta.

== Route ==
=== In Scandinavia ===
The EV7 starts in North Cape and passes briefly into Finland before going down the length of Sweden through Luleå, Sundsvall, Falun, Örebro, Göteborg to Helsingborg from where a ferry will take the traveller to Denmark. Sections of the Swedish part of the route include the Kattegattleden.

In Denmark, the EV7 follows Danish National Cycle Routes numbers 5, 8 and 9 crossing the country via small islands, ferries and panorama landscapes. The route will take you from Helsingør to Copenhagen, where there are many fishing villages, while from Copenhagen the EV7 follows the Berlin-Copenhagen Cycle Route to Gedser from where a ferry takes the traveller to the German port of Rostock.

=== In Germany ===
From the German port of Rostock on the Baltic Sea coast the EV7 continues to follow the Berlin-Copenhagen Cycle Route towards Berlin. Passing through the state of Mecklenburg-Western Pomerania it takes the route south towards the Mecklenburg Lakes. The towns of Neustrelitz and Güstrow offer cultural attractions en route. It then follows the Havel River and the towns of Oranienburg and Fürstenberg/Havel and the tranquil expanse of the state of Brandenburg towards Berlin.

After Berlin, the EV7 eventually connects at Lutherstadt Wittenberg to the Elbe Cycle Route which leads through Dresden and uphill all the way on its way to the Czech border.

=== In Czechia ===
The EV7 crosses the border with Germany, in the region of the Elbe Sandstone Mountains. After a certain part of the route as it follows the Elbe Cycle Route to Mělník (about 50 km (31 mi) from Prague) with a château and steep vineyards at the confluence of the Vltava (Moldau) and the Labe (Elbe) rivers. It continues then to Prague on the Vltava. After Prague the EV7 leaves the Vltava (Moldau) due to the cascade of the water and joins it again before Týn nad Vltavou.The route then passes the picturesque UNESCO town of Český Krumlov.

=== In Austria ===
From the Czech border the EV7 passes through Linz and Salzburg before it passes into the Alps to Italy. Its length is 553 km (344 mi).

The Austrian section of EV7 offers some scenery cycling along alpine rivers, through towns like Linz and Salzburg and taking in some of Europe's largest nature reserves. It crosses the Czech border into Austria at Rybnik, and follows the Grenzland cycle route (R5), then the Gusental cycle route (R28) along minor roads in the province of Upper Austria. From St. Georgen an der Gusen, it follows the Danube cycle route (R1) through the town of Linz, past the famous river bends of the “Schlögener Loop” until you reach Passau, Germany. You can then follow the Inn cycle route (R3) along the Austrian-German border, through the nature reserves of the Inn valley, all the way to Salzburg. From Salzburg, the EV7 follows the Alpe-Adria Trail, which makes use of new railway tunnels to cross the Alps without difficult climbs. Then, there are short sections following the Glockner cycle route (R8) until "Möllbrücke" and then the Drau cycle route (R1) through the province of Carinthia lead you to the border crossing with Italy near the town of Sillian.

=== In Italy ===
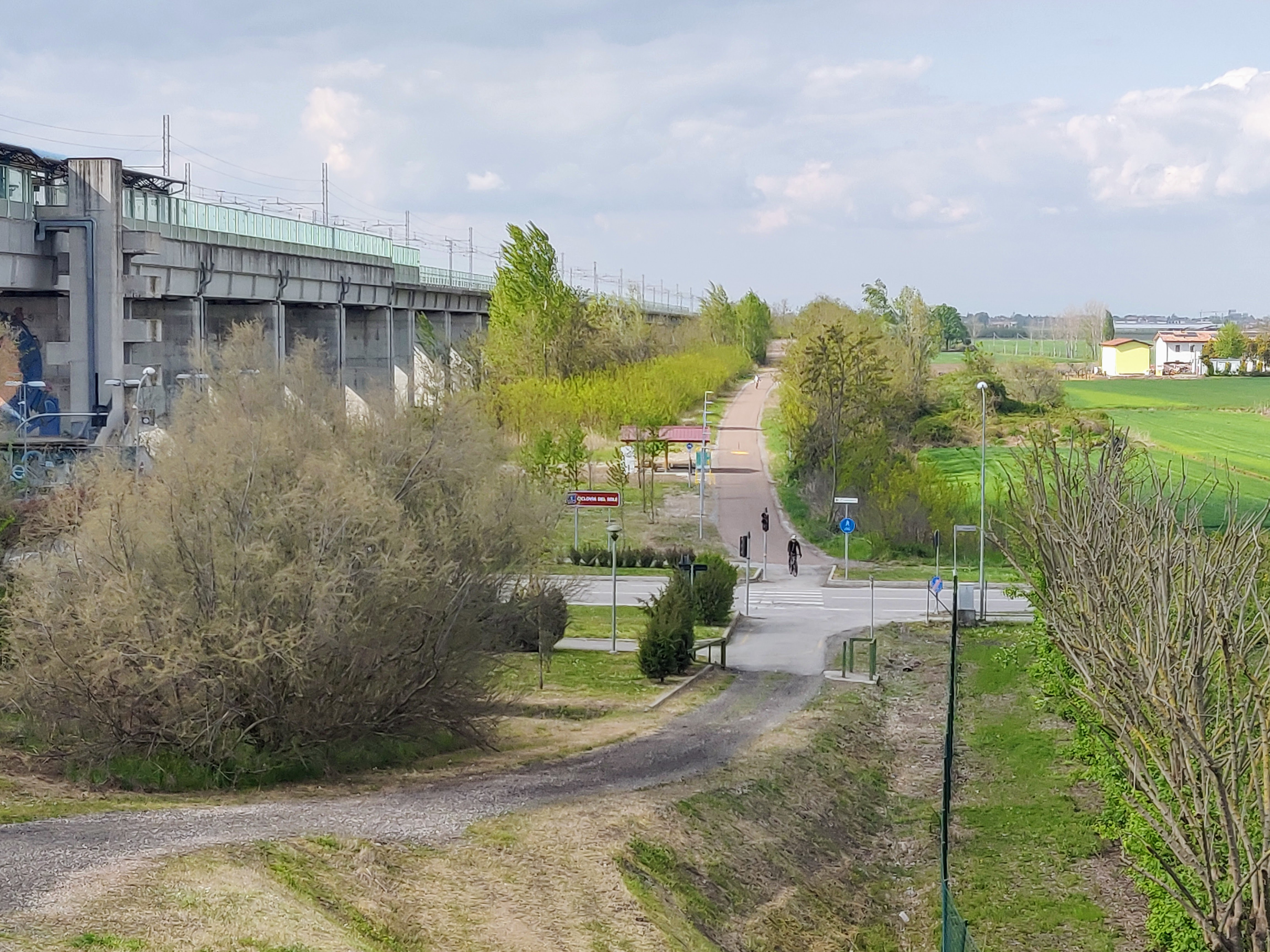
A stretch of EuroVelo 7 at Camposanto, Emilia-Romagna, Italy.

The EV7 in Italy follows the BicItalia route B1, known as the Ciclopista del Sole (the Sun Cycle Route), through from the Austrian border into South Tyrol, then through the cities of Verona, Mantua, Bologna, Florence, Grosseto, Civitavecchia, Rome, Latina, Naples, Salerno, Reggio Calabria, Messina and Siracusa in Sicily. The Italian section of the EV7 terminates in the Sicilian town of Pozzallo from where ferries connect to Valletta in Malta.

=== In Malta ===
There are two EV7 circuits in Malta: one circuits the island of Malta and the other the island of Gozo.

== Gallery ==
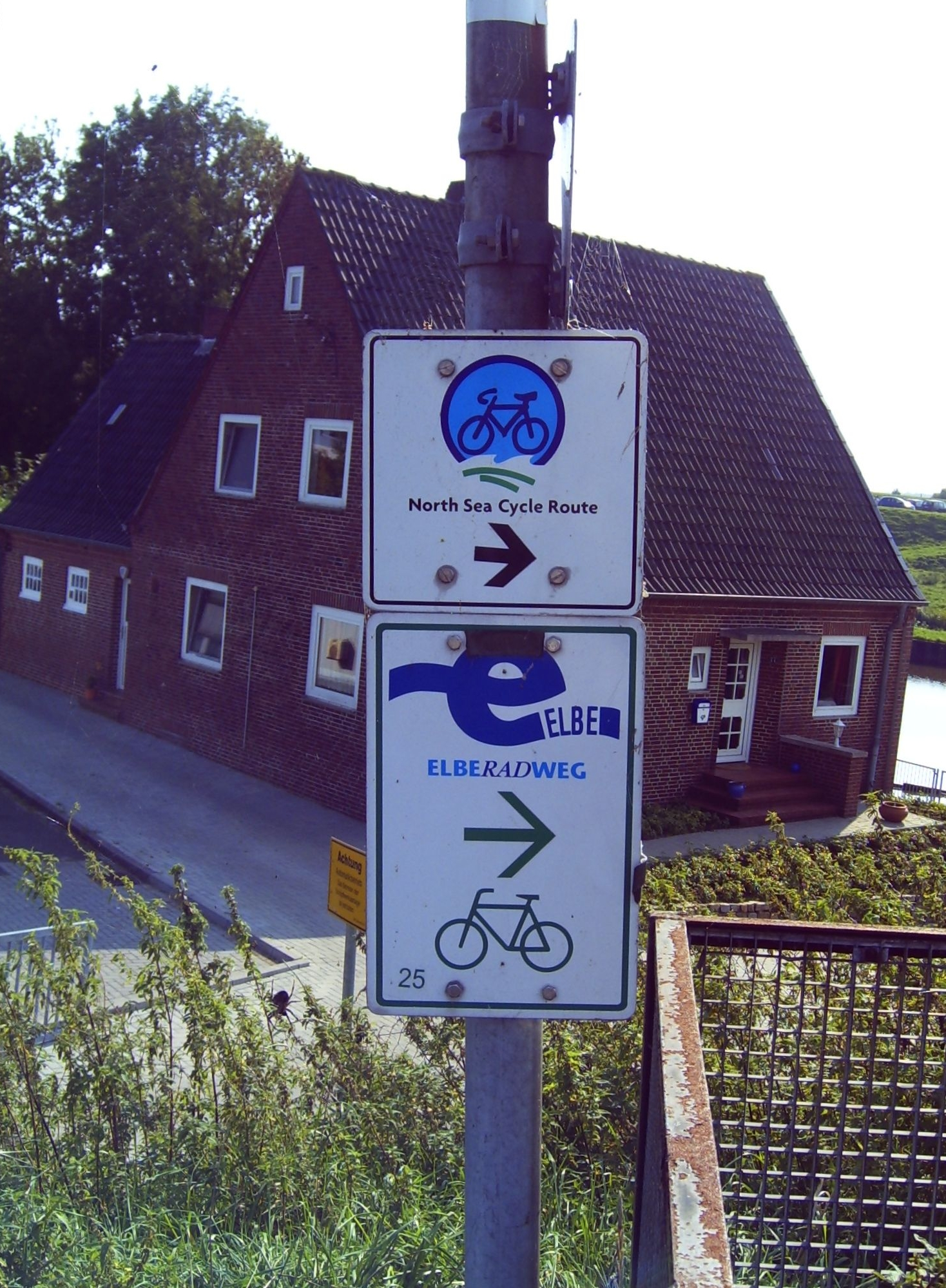
Elbe Cycle Route sign at the harbour in Glückstadt

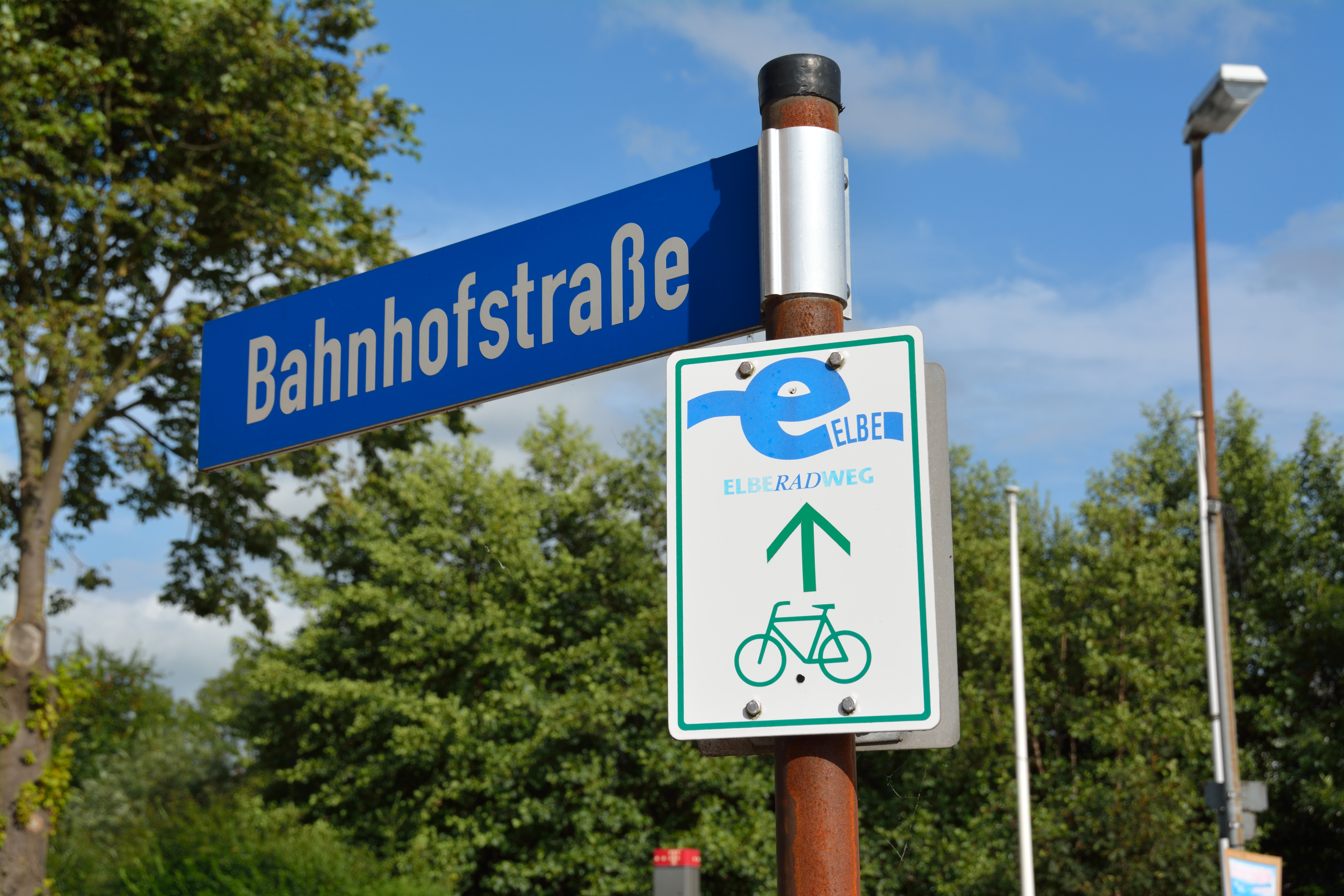
Elbe Cycle Route sign in Brunsbüttel

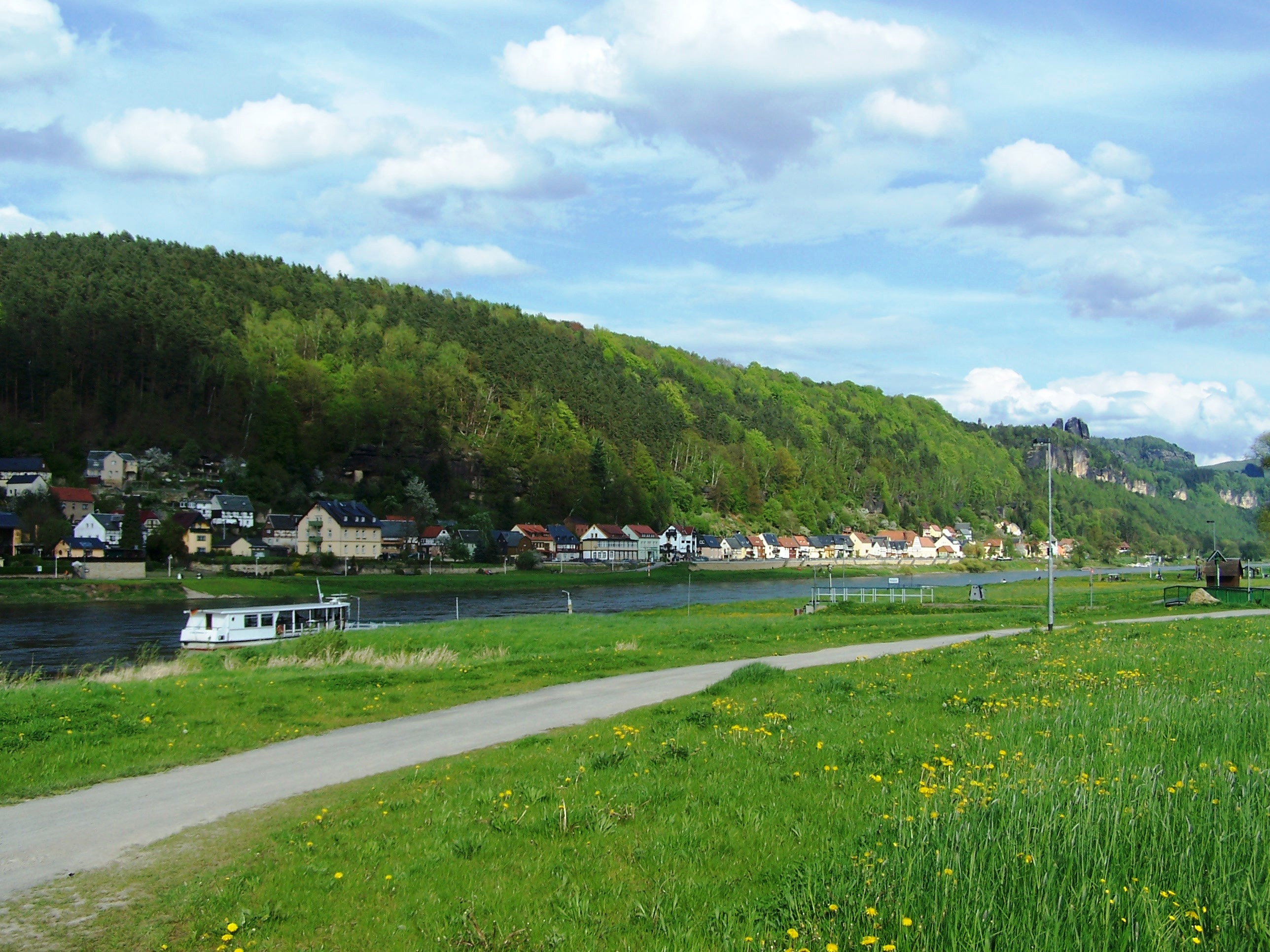
The EV7 in Bad Schandau, Sächsische Schweiz

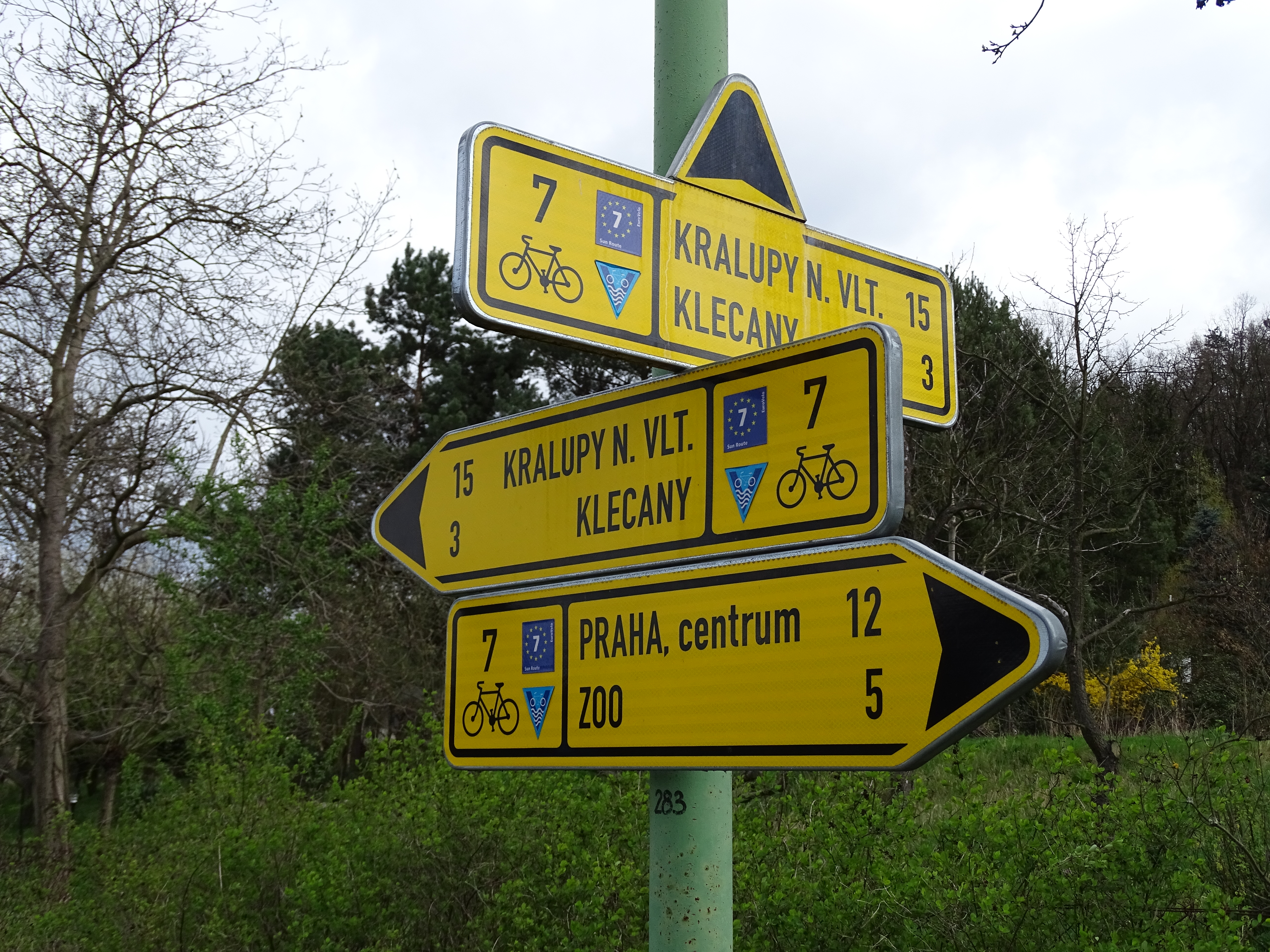
EV7 signs in Klecany, Czech Republic

== See also ==
- EuroVelo
- Elbe
- German Cycling Network
