= EV3 The Pilgrims Route =

European cycling route

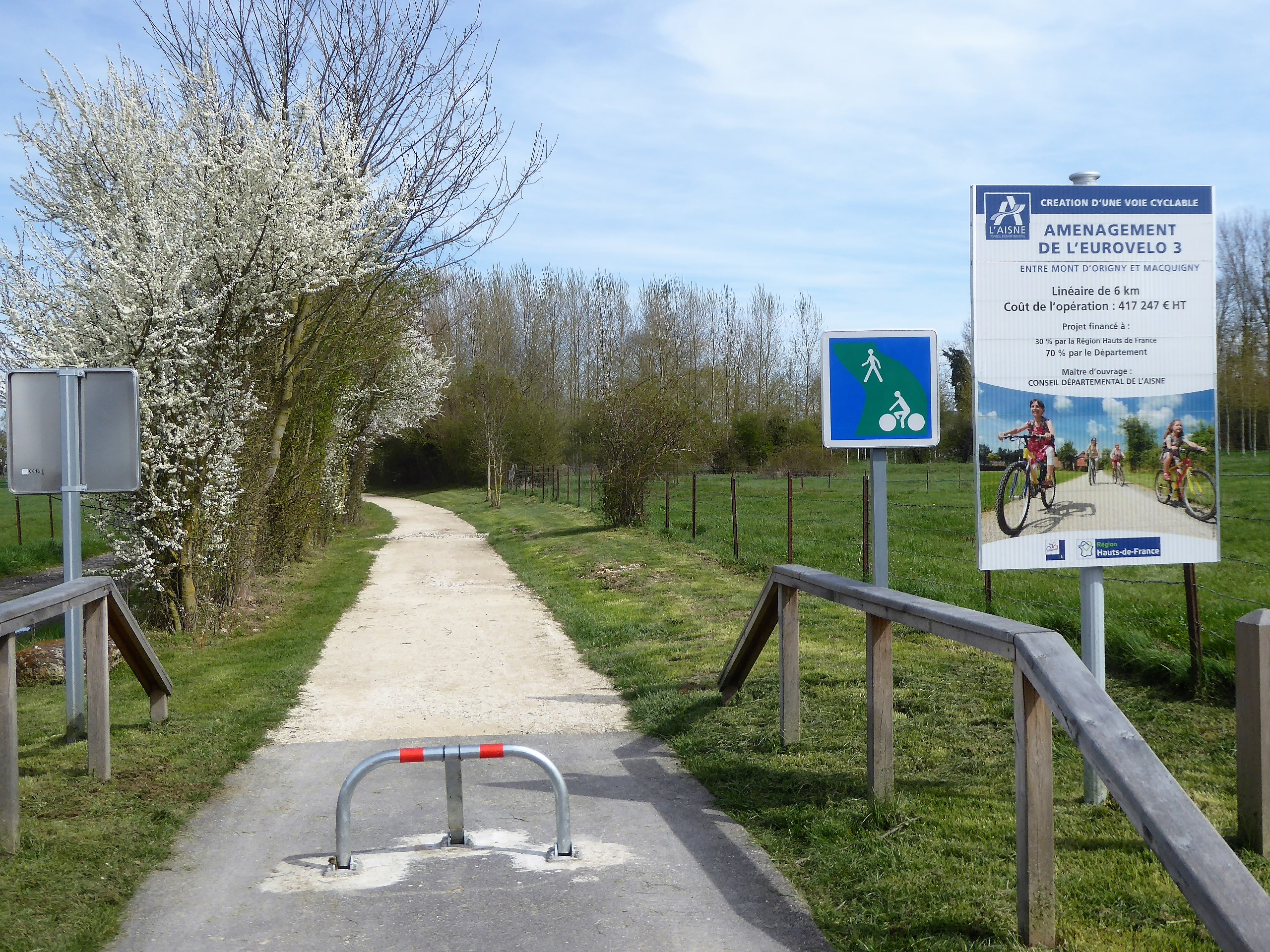
- Length: 5,650 km (3,510 mi)
- Designation: European Cyclists' Federation
- Trailheads: Trondheim, Norway to Santiago de Compostela, Spain
- Use: cycling
- Website: https://en.eurovelo.com/ev3
Trail map

Map of the EuroVelo 3 (EV3) route, known as the Pilgrims Route.

EuroVelo 3 (EV3), named the Pilgrims Route, is a EuroVelo long-distance cycling route running 5,650 km (3,510 mi) running from Trondheim in Norway to Santiago de Compostela in Spain. This north-south route travels through Europe passing successively through seven countries: Norway, Sweden, Denmark, Germany, Belgium, France and Spain.

== The route ==
As of 2012, the EV3 is partially complete. It runs through the following countries and towns: the connections with other EuroVelo routes are given in parentheses, e.g. (EV15).

=== In Norway ===
Trondheim (EV1), Røros, Lillehammer, Oslo.

In Norway, the EV3 follows the Norwegian National Cycle Route 7, from Trondheim through Lillehammer and Oslo to Moss. From Moss the EV3 follows the Norwegian National Cycle Route 1 through Fredrikstad and Sarpsborg to the Swedish border at Halden. (Note that this last stretch, from Moss to the border, follows the same route as the EV12.)

=== In Sweden ===
Strömstad, Lysekil, Stenungsund, Gothenburg (EV12)

In Sweden, the EV3 follows the bike path known as the Cykelspåret på Västkusten. (Again, the EV3 is the same route in Sweden as the EV12.)

=== In Denmark ===
Frederikshavn (EV12), Aalborg, Viborg, Padborg (EV10)

In Denmark, the EV3 follows the 450 km (280 mi) long Danish National Cycle Route known as the Hærvejsruten which follows the approximate route to the ancient Hærvejen path. The route leads from the port of Frederikshavn on the north coast through the cities of Aalborg, Hobro, Viborg, Vejen, Vojens, Rødekro and Padborg to Kruså at the border with Germany .

=== In Germany ===
Flensburg (EV10), Hamburg (EV12), Bremen, Münster (EV2), Düsseldorf (EV4, EV15), Cologne (EV4, EV15), Bonn (EV4, EV15), Aachen.

In Germany, the EV3 follows the entire length of the German Cycling Network D-Route D7. From Flensburg the EV3 continues to follow the Hærvejen path (in Germany called the Ochsenweg) to the cities of Schleswig, Rendsburg, Hohenwestedt, Itzehoe and Elmshorn to Hamburg. From there the EV3 passes through Zeven, Bremen, Osnabrück, Münster, Haltern, Dorsten, Wesel, Rheinberg, Duisburg, Düsseldorf, Cologne, Bonn, the Rhine river, Euskirchen to Aachen.

=== In Belgium ===
Liège, Namur (EV5), Charleroi.

In Belgium, the EV3 is not yet fully finalised. It will pass through Liège, Huy, Andenne, Namur, Sambreville, Charleroi, Thuin and Erquelinnes.

=== In France ===
Compiègne, Paris, Orléans (EV6), Tours (EV6), Bordeaux, Saint-Jean-Pied-de-Port.

The French section of the EV3 is 1,593 km (990 mi) long and connects Jeumont in the north of France right through to Saint-Jean-Pied-de-Port in the Pyrenees. It passes through the cities of Maubeuge, Fourmies, Compiègne, Senlis, Paris, Melun, Montargis, Orleans, Blois, Tours, Chatellerault, Poitiers, Angoulême, Bordeaux, Mont-de-Marsan, Dax, Saint-Jean-Pied-de-Port though the route has not been finalised between the Loire and the Pyrenees.

=== In Spain ===
Pamplona (EV1), Burgos (EV1), León, Santiago de Compostela.

The EV3 always runs close to the pilgrimage route the French Way of the Way of St. James pilgrimage to the shrine of the Apostle of Saint James the Great in Santiago de Compostela.

== Gallery ==
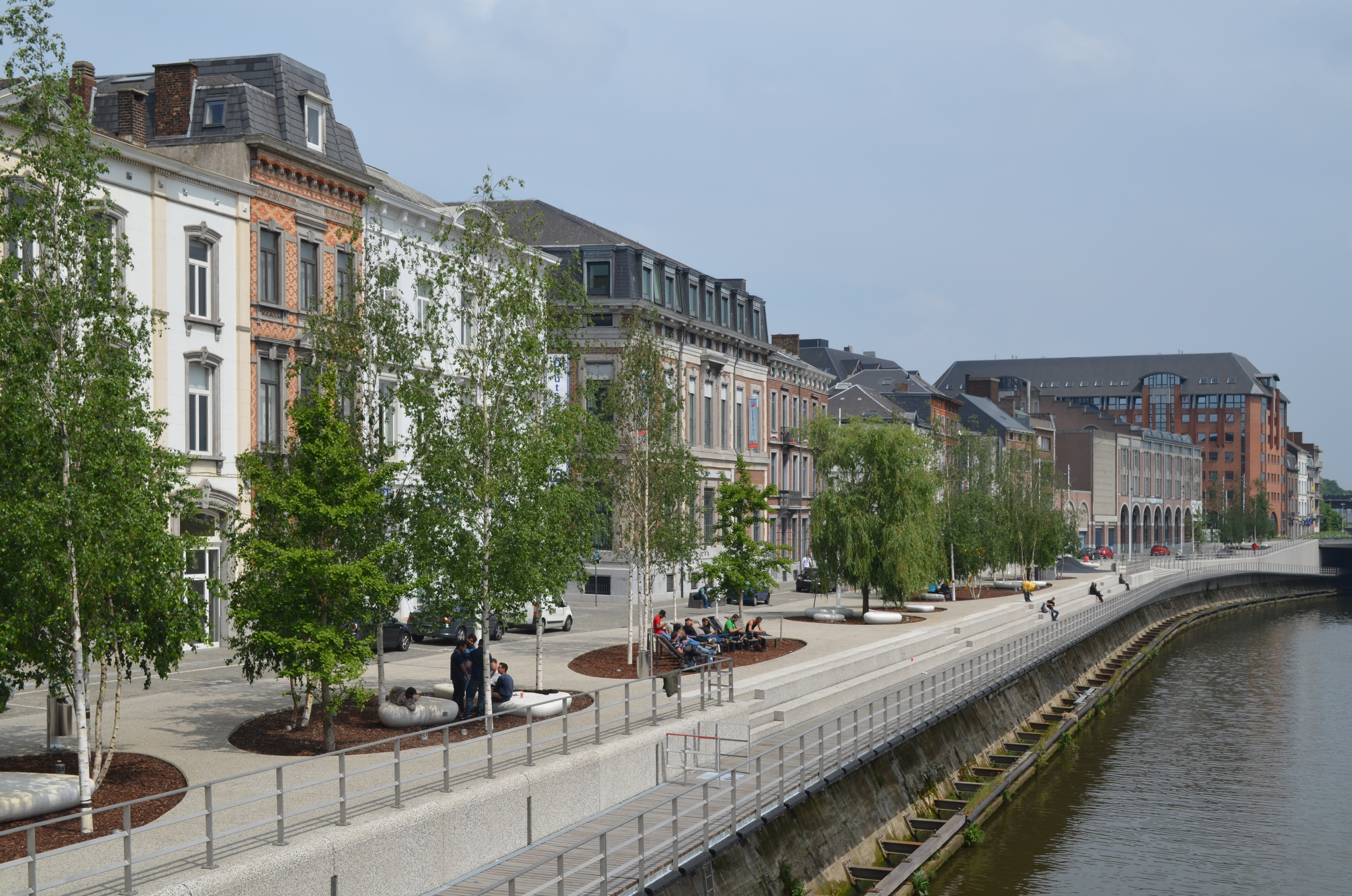
The EV3 following the Sambre in Charleroi.

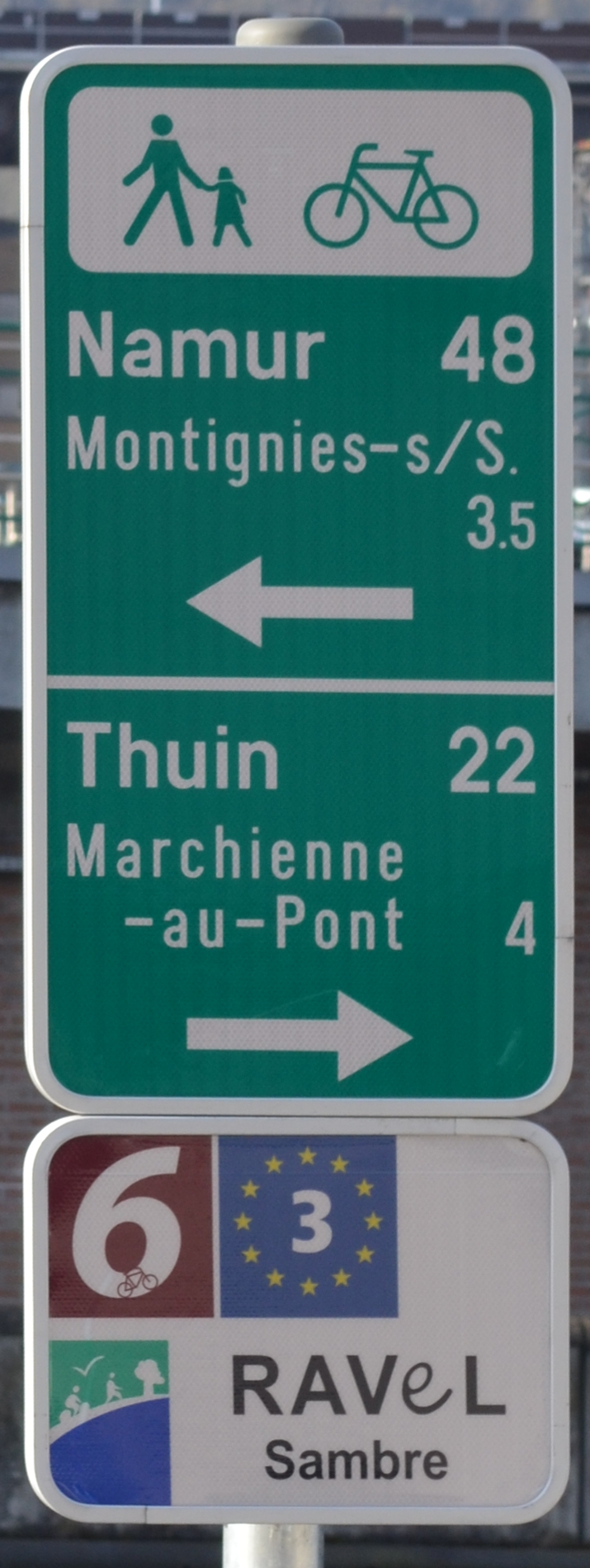

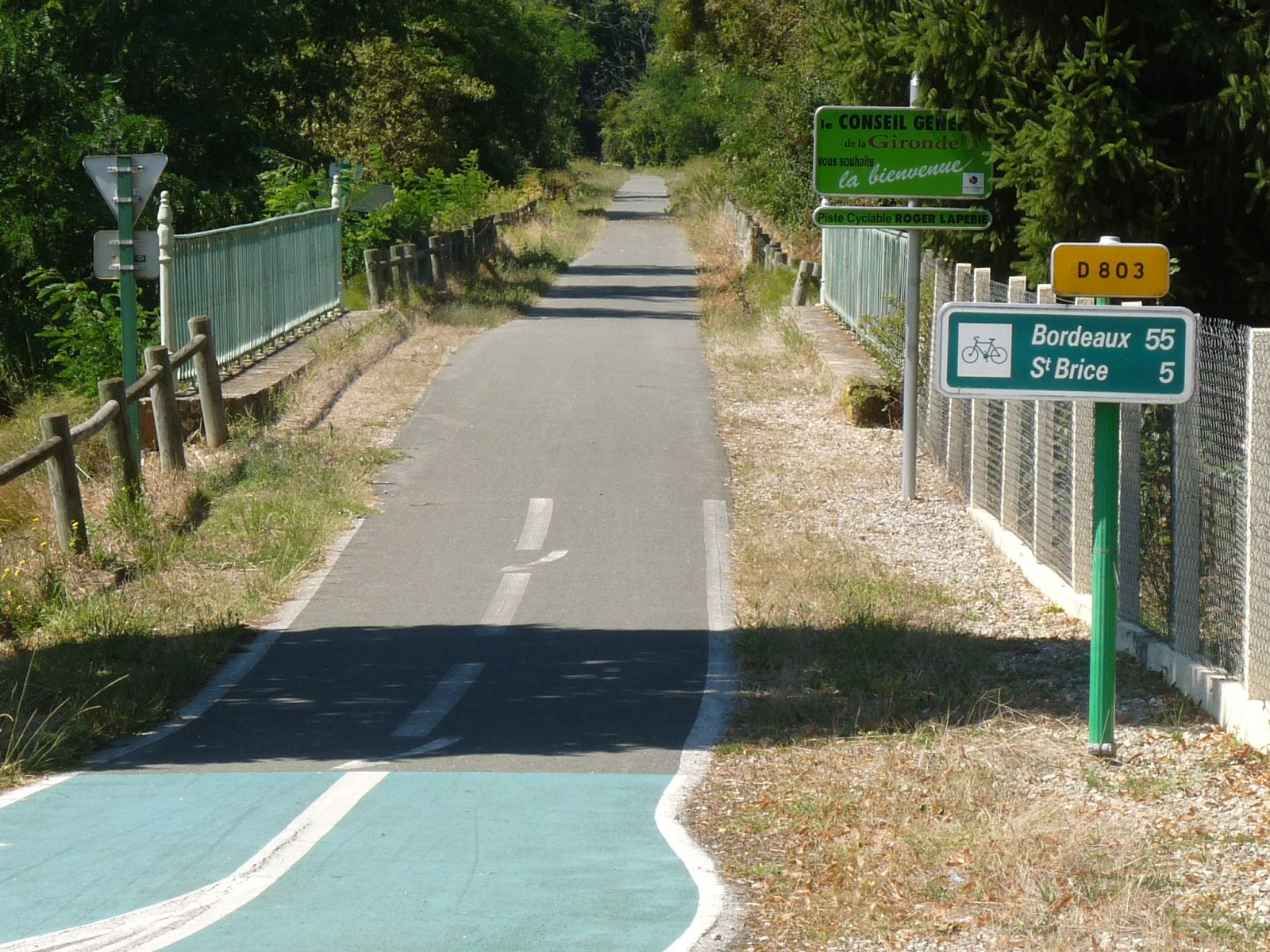
The EV3 follows the rail trail Voie verte "Roger-Lapébie" in Gironde.

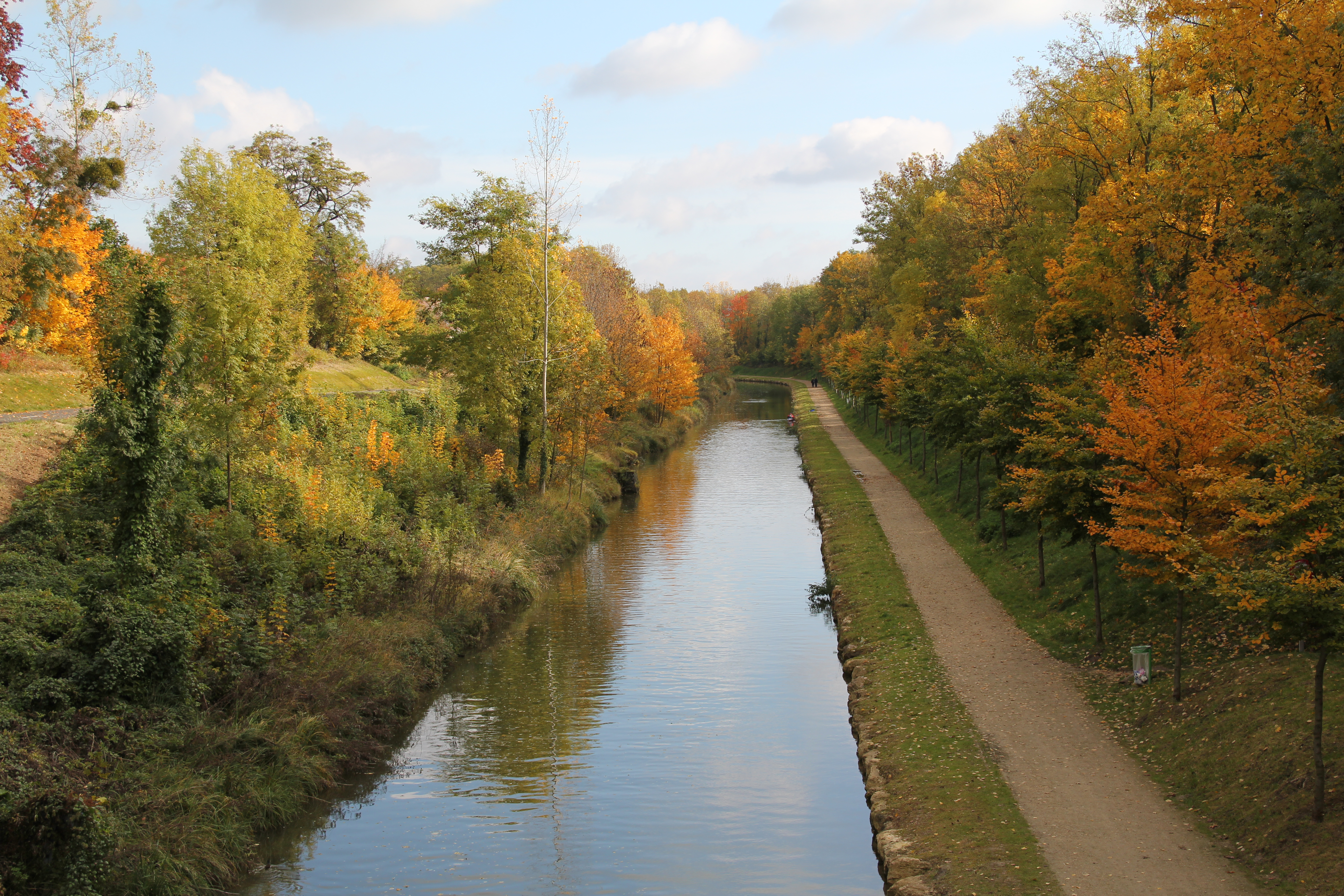
The EV3 following the Ourcq canal, Villeparisis, France.

== See also ==
- EuroVelo
- Norwegian National Cycle Routes
- Sverigeleden
- Danish National Cycle Routes
- German Cycling Network
