= Norwegian National Cycle Routes =

Network of cycle routes in Norway

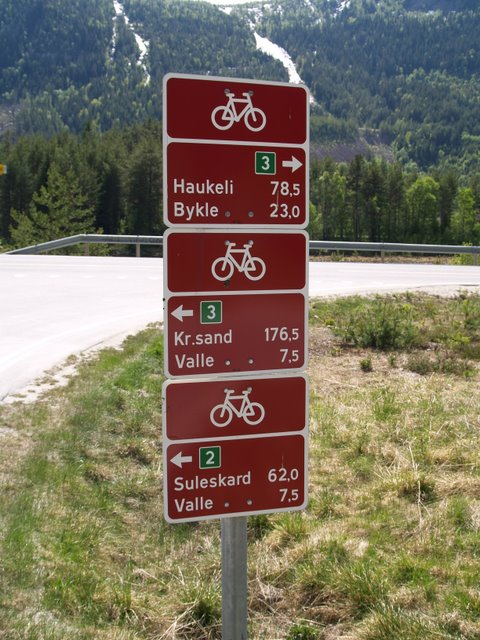
Signpost at an intersection of Norwegian National Cycle Routes 2 and 3.

The Norwegian National Cycle Routes (Nasjonal sykkelrute) form the national cycling route network of Norway. There are currently 10 such long-distance cycling routes, criss-crossing Norway and these were established mainly to promote bicycle tourism.

== Routes ==
As of March 2014 the list of Norwegian National Cycle Routes is as follows:

1. Svinesund to Kirkenes
2. Porsgrunn to Stavanger
3. Kristiansand, Setesdal and Hardanger
4. Bergen, Finse, Oslo
5. Larvik, Kongsberg, Geilo
6. Røros to Hardanger
7. Halden, Oslo, Nidaros
8. Oppdal to Molde
9. Halden to Trondheim
10. Northcape to Lindesnes

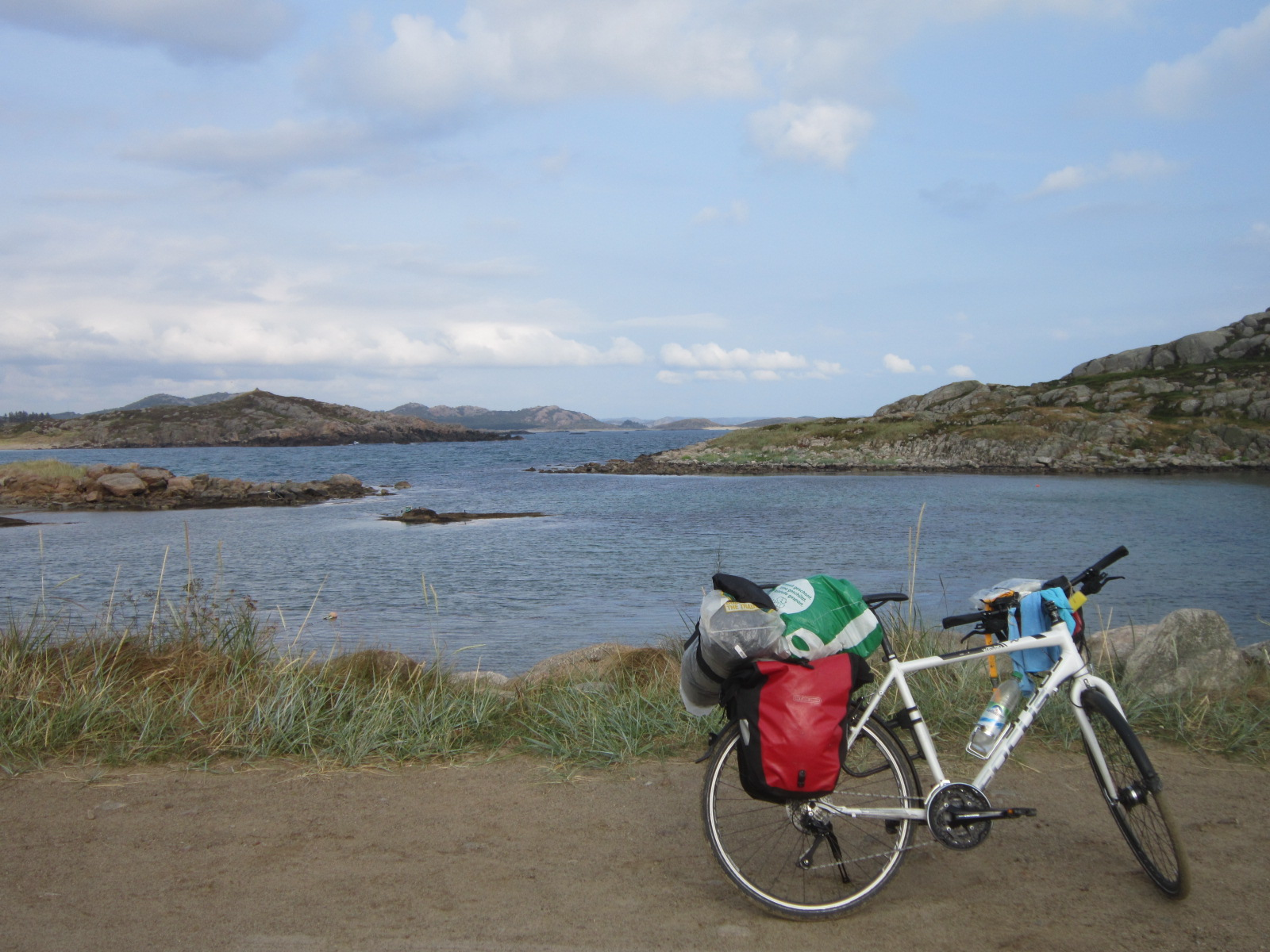
Long-distance cycling on the national cycling route Number 1, Norway

== See also ==
- EuroVelo, a network of 17 long-distance cycling routes in Europe
- LF-routes, the national cycling route network of the Netherlands
- National Cycle Network, the national cycling route network of the United Kingdom
