= EV15 The Rhine Cycle Route =

European cycling route

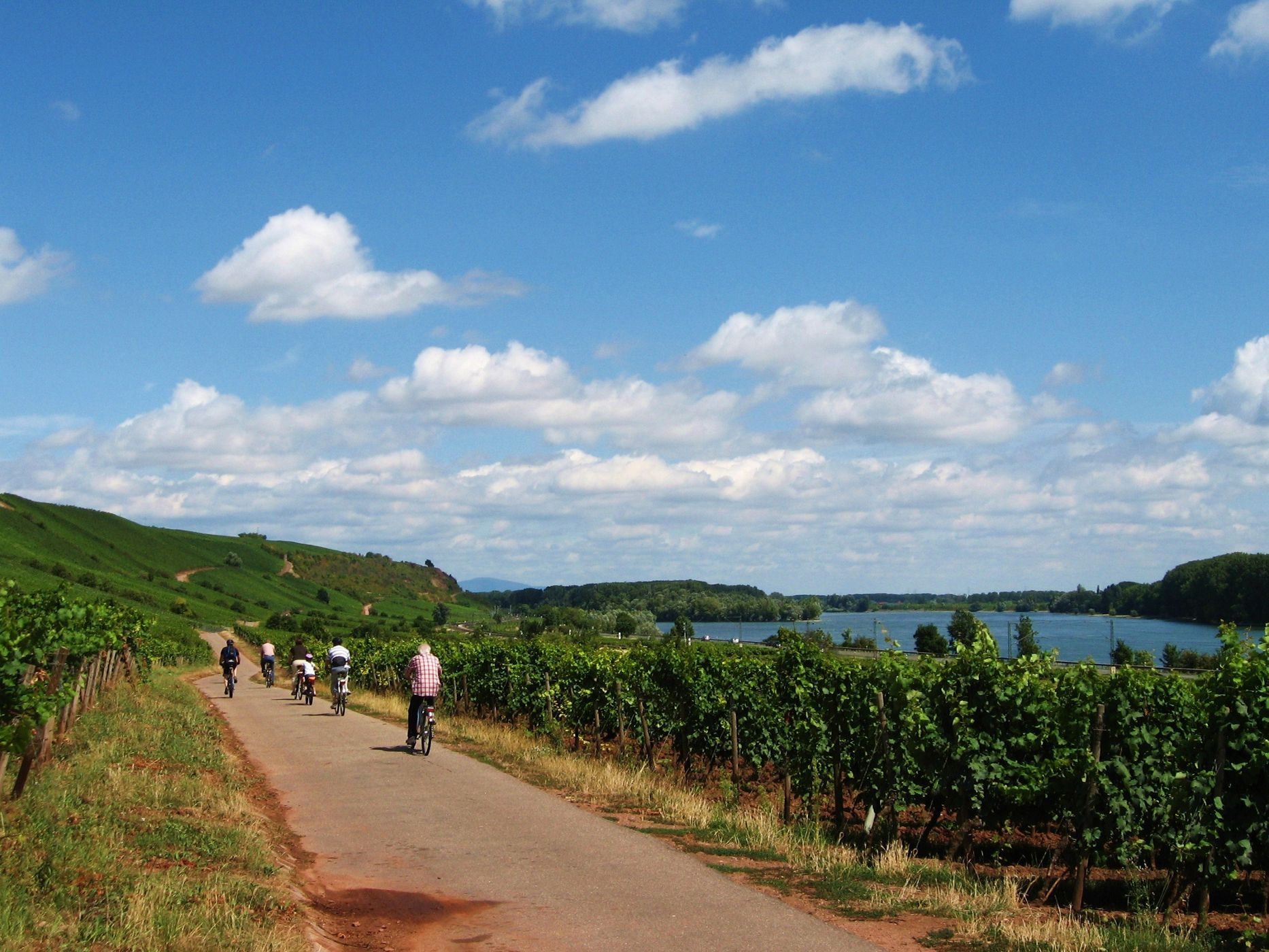
- Route between Worms and Mainz
- Length: 1,233 km (766 mi)
- Designation: European Cyclists' Federation
- Trailheads: Andermatt, Switzerland to Rotterdam, Netherlands
- Use: cycling
- Website: http://www.rhinecycleroute.eu
Trail map

Map of the EuroVelo 15, the Rhine Cycle Route.

EuroVelo 15 (EV15), named the Rhine Cycle Route, is a EuroVelo long-distance cycling route running 1230km along the Rhine river valley from the headwaters of the Rhine in Andermatt in Switzerland to the river's mouth in Hook of Holland in the Netherlands. The route crosses Europe from south to north, from the Swiss Alps to the North Sea, passing through four countries: Switzerland, France, Germany and the Netherlands.

The Rhine Cycle Route is called the following in the languages along its course: German: Rheinradweg, French: Véloroute Rhin and Dutch: Rijnfietsroute.

== Overview ==
The Rhine is Europe's most well-known and most historic river. Throughout its steady north–south course from the Alps to the North Sea, it is one of the most attractive rivers for tourists with its most charming countryside. It has been one of the most important traffic routes for cultural exchange between the Mediterranean region and Northern Europe for two thousand years. The fluvial topography of the Rhine is amongst the most enchanting and invites to visit the bordering cities and villages with numerous UNESCO World Heritage Sites, like Strasbourg, Speyer Cathedral, the Rhine Gorge and Cologne Cathedral.

== Route ==
- Switzerland: EV15 follows Swiss National Bike Route no. 2.
  - Andermatt, Disentis, Chur, Rorschach, Schaffhausen, Zurzach, Basel.
- France:
  - Huningue, Ottmarsheim, Neuf-Brisach, Marckolsheim, Erstein, Eschau, Strasbourg, La Wantzenau, Gambsheim, Drusenheim, Sessenheim, Rœschwoog, Seltz, Munchhausen, Mothern, Lauterbourg.
- Germany: EV15 follows D-Route no. 8.
  - Karlsruhe, Speyer, Ludwigshafen, Mannheim, Worms, Oppenheim, Mainz, Wiesbaden, Bingen, Rüdesheim, Boppard, Koblenz, Andernach, Bonn, Cologne, Düsseldorf, Duisburg, Xanten, Emmerich am Rhein.
- Netherlands: EV15 follows a number of LF-routes.
  - Millingen aan de Rijn, Arnhem, Utrecht, Rotterdam, Hook of Holland.

== See also ==
- Dutch National Cycle Routes
- EuroVelo
- German Cycling Network
- Swiss National Bike Routes
