= Sverigeleden =

Network of cycle routes in Sweden

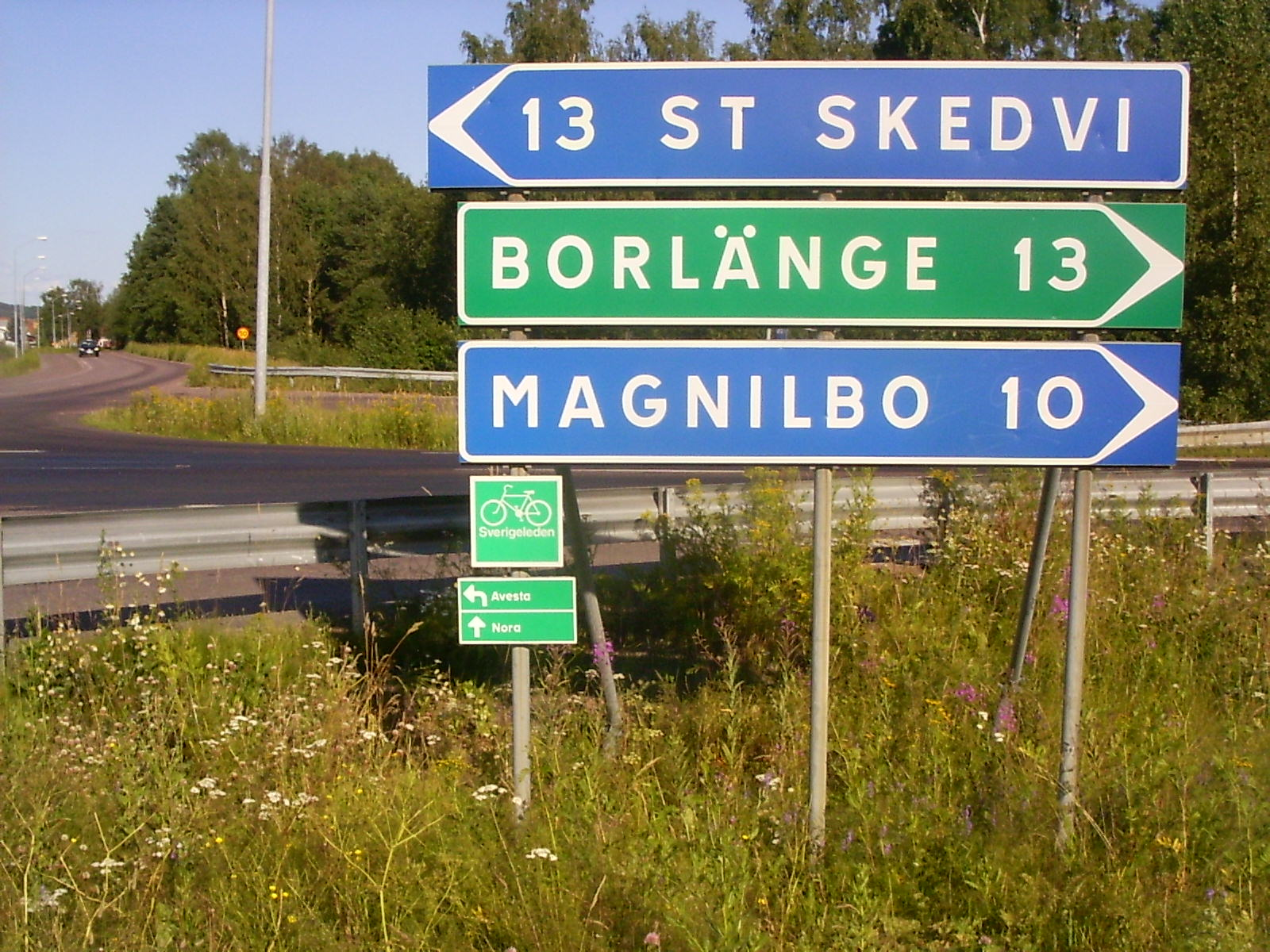
Note the small green Sverigeleden signs below the normal road signs.

Sverigeleden (in English, the "Sweden route") is a connected network of 15 main long-distance cycling routes across Sweden and a further 24 branches. Together this network forms the national cycling route network of Sweden. The Sverigeleden was largely established to promote bicycle tourism.

The main routes of the Sverigeleden extend from Helsingborg in the south to Karesuando in the north and measure 2,620 km (1,630 mi). The remaining sections form alternate branch routes which measure an additional 3,980 km (2,470 mi). The routes are signposted with green signs by the Svenska Cykelsällskapet (Swedish Cycling Association) in co-operation with local roadworks authorities. The routes are mainly on lightly trafficked, paved roads in scenic areas.

== See also ==
- EuroVelo
