= EV8 The Mediterranean Route =

European cycling route

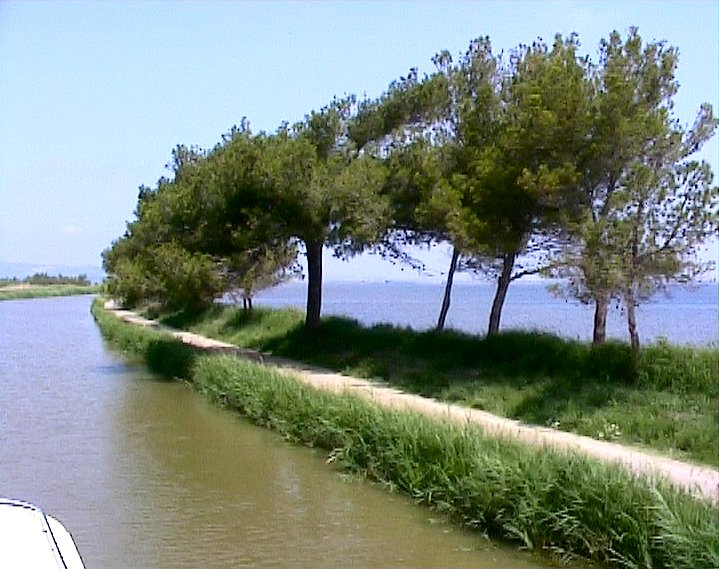
- Length: 7,560 km (4,700 mi)
- Designation: European Cyclists' Federation
- Trailheads: Cádiz, Spain to Greece, Turkey, and Cyprus
- Use: cycling
- Website: http://www.eurovelo8.com
Trail map

Map of the EuroVelo 8 route

EuroVelo 8 (EV8), named the Mediterranean Route, is a 7,560 km (4,700 mi) long EuroVelo long-distance cycling route running from Cádiz, Spain to Athens, Greece, and then continuing to İzmir, Turkey and to the island of Cyprus. The route runs east-west across Europe mainly along or close to the Mediterranean coast, passing successively through 12 countries: Spain, France, Monaco, Italy, Slovenia, Croatia, Bosnia-Herzegovina, Montenegro, Albania, Greece, Turkey, and Cyprus.

== Route ==
As of January 2014, the EV8 route is one of the least complete EuroVelo routes.

=== In Spain ===
As of January 2021, the EV8 in Spain is incomplete, a lot of the riding will be on roads. Only a few sections are complete and signposted:

- The "Pirinexus" Cycle Route which has been open in Catalonia since March 2013, and the EV8 follows this from Sant Feliu de Guíxols to the border.
- The section between Cádiz and Guadiaro (north of Gibraltar)
- The route from Almería to Carboneras

The route starts in Cádiz and passes through Malaga, Granada, Almería, Valencia, and Barcelona before crossing the border into France.

=== In France ===
In France, the EV8 is complete and signposted from the Spanish to the Italian border. It is around 800 km (500 mi) long and most of the time following the coast of the Mediterranean Sea. It arrives in France from the border with Spain over the Panissars pass over the Pyrenees at Le Perthus and departs at Menton on the border with Italy. In doing so, it passes through the cities of Argelès-sur-Mer, Port Barcarès, Port Leucate, Narbonne, Béziers, Agde, Sète, La Grande-Motte, Cavaillon, Apt, Forcalquier, and Nice.

=== In Italy ===
As of January 2014 approximately half of the route in Italy has been completed.

In Italy, the EV8 goes through Turin, Piacenza (EV5), Mantua (EV7), Ferrara, Venice, and Trieste (EV9).

In Italy, though the EV8 is still in development from the French border to Pavia, from there it has been completed to just past Venice. From Pavia, the EV8 follows either of two branches of the BicItalia 2 (BI2) route along the Po river valley: these are the BI 2 Ciclovia del Po e delle Lagune EV8 and the BI 2 Ciclovia Destra Po EV8.

=== In Slovenia ===
As of January 2014, the EV8 in Slovenia is still under development: though the route may still be cycled, it may be on busy roads.

In Slovenia, the EV8 goes through Koper (EV9).

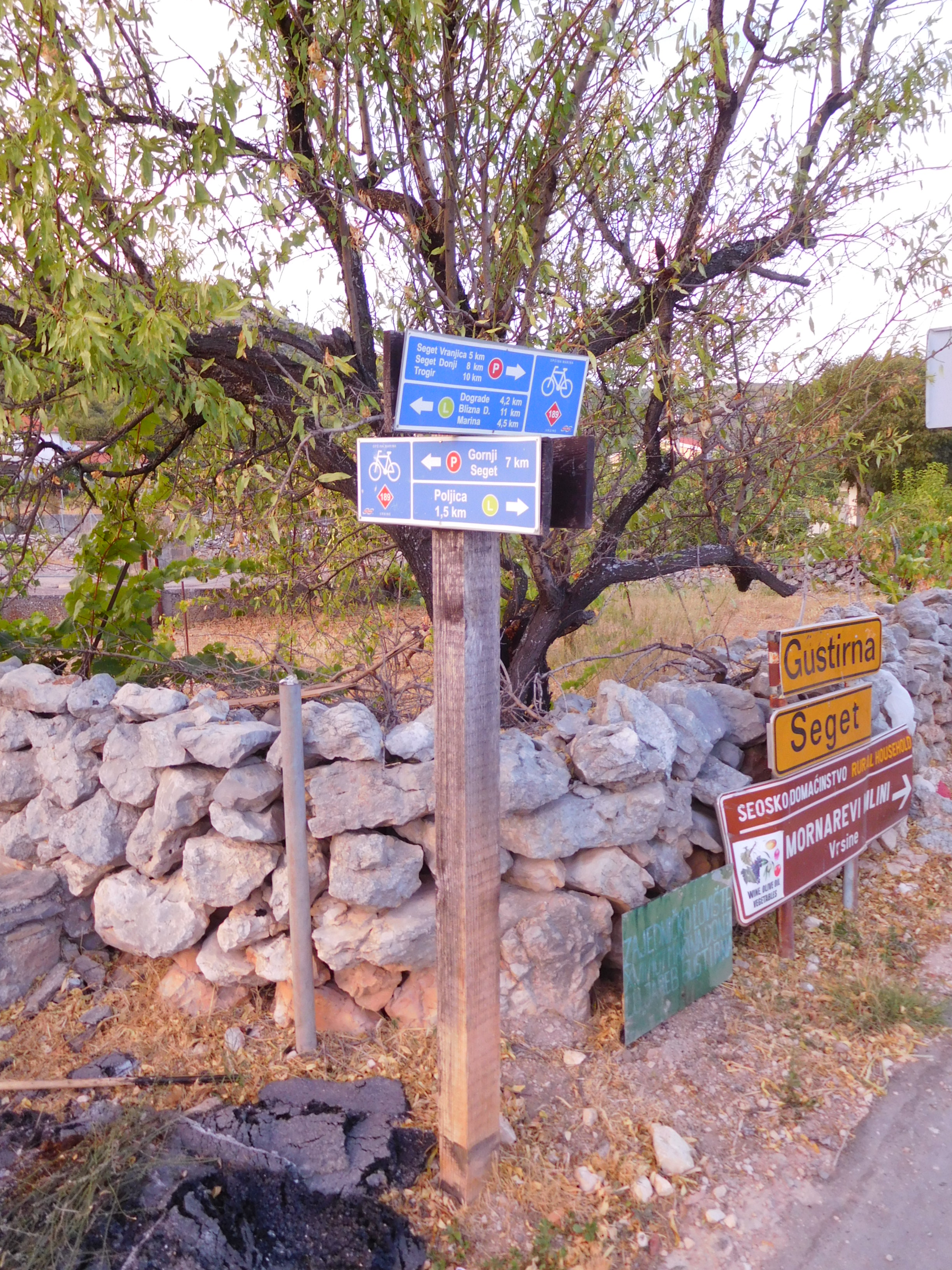
Cycling route fingerpost in Vrsine, Croatia

=== In Croatia ===
As of January 2014, the EV8 in Croatia is still under development: though the route may still be cycled, it may be on busy roads.

In Croatia, the EV8 goes through Pula (EV9), Rijeka, Zadar, Split, Klek and Dubrovnik.

=== In Bosnia and Herzegovina ===
As of January 2014, the EV8 in Bosnia and Herzegovina is in development.

Only 14 km of the EV8 passes through Bosnia and Herzegovina so you will actually be cycling along the whole of the country's coastline! The route enters from Klek in Croatia and heads towards the only town on the coast, Neum. Several kilometers south-east of Neum, the EV8 re-enters Croatia.

=== In Montenegro ===
As of January 2014, the EV8 in Montenegro is in development.

In Montenegro, the EV8 goes through Kotor, Podgorica. It will pass by the Bay of Kotor, a UNESCO world heritage site, on the way around the Adriatic coast to Podgorica, the country's capital.

=== In Albania ===
As of January 2014, the EV8 in Albania is still yet to be developed.

In Albania, the EV8 goes through Shkodra, Tirana, Durrës

=== In Greece ===
As of January 2014, the EV8 in Greece is in development.

In Greece, the EV8 goes through Igoumenitsa, Patras, Corinth and Athens (EV11).

=== In Turkey ===
As of November 2019, the EV8 in Turkey is developed with EuroVelo signs.

In Turkey, the EV8 goes through İzmir Province.

=== In Cyprus ===
As of January 2014, the EV8 in Cyprus is yet to be developed.

In Cyprus, the EV8 does a circuit of the island and goes through Lemesos.

== Gallery ==
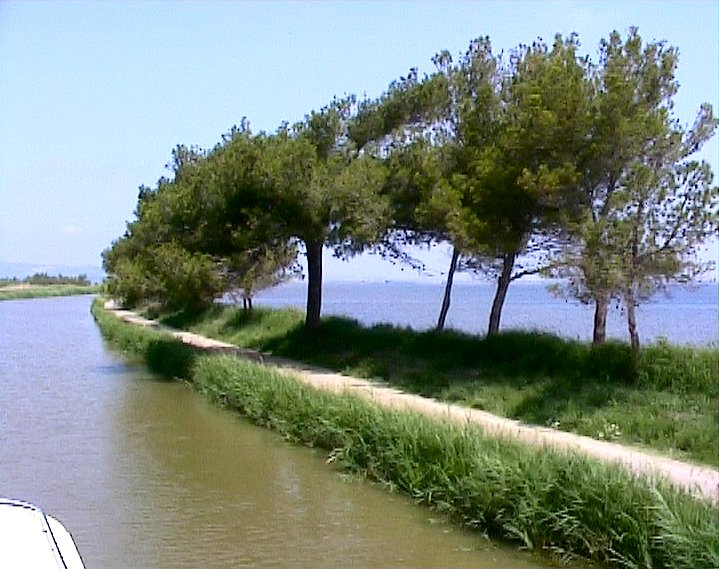
The EV8 along the Canal de la Robine near Narbonne, France

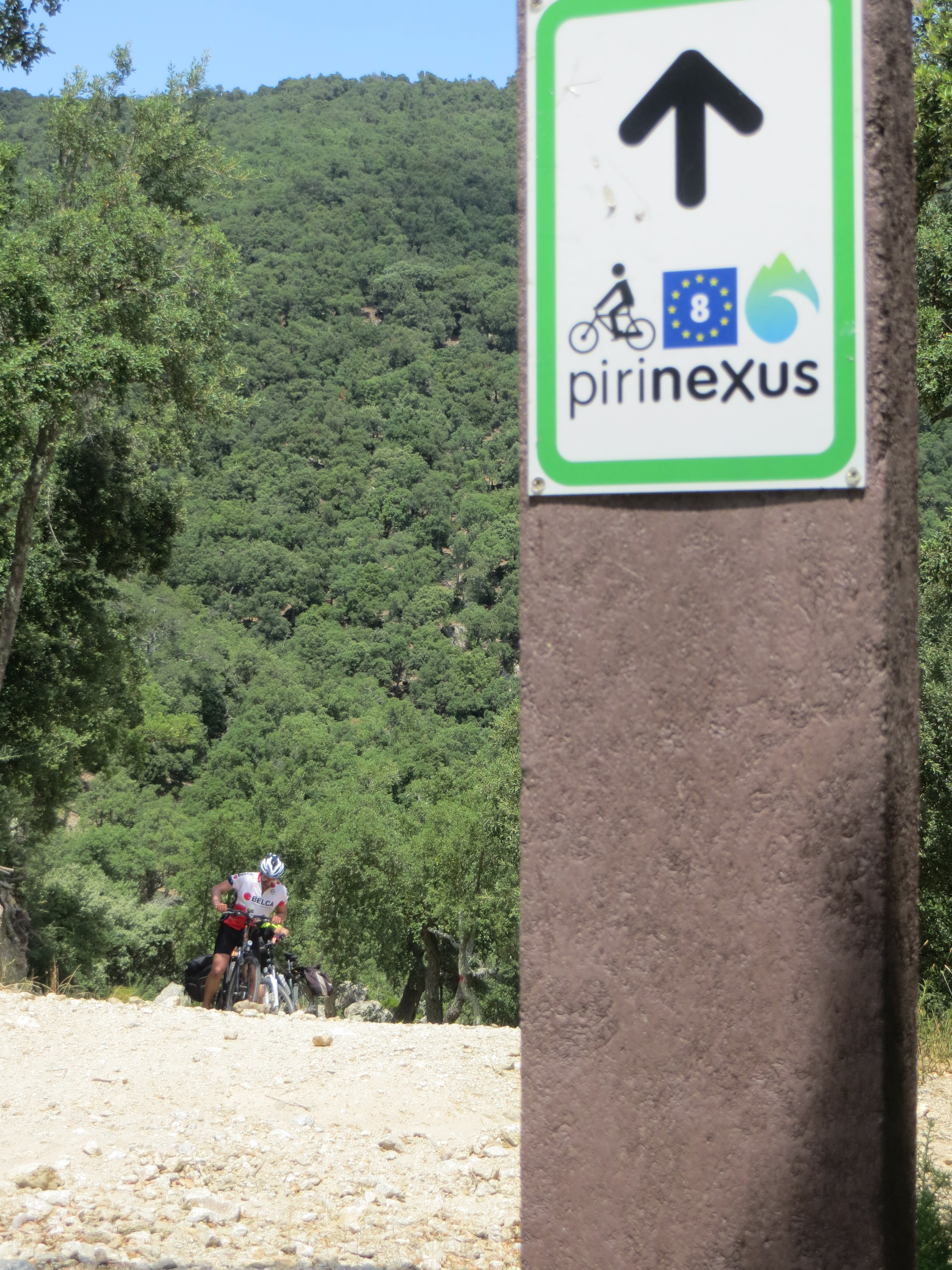
Pirinexus Cycle Route near La Jonquera, Barcelona

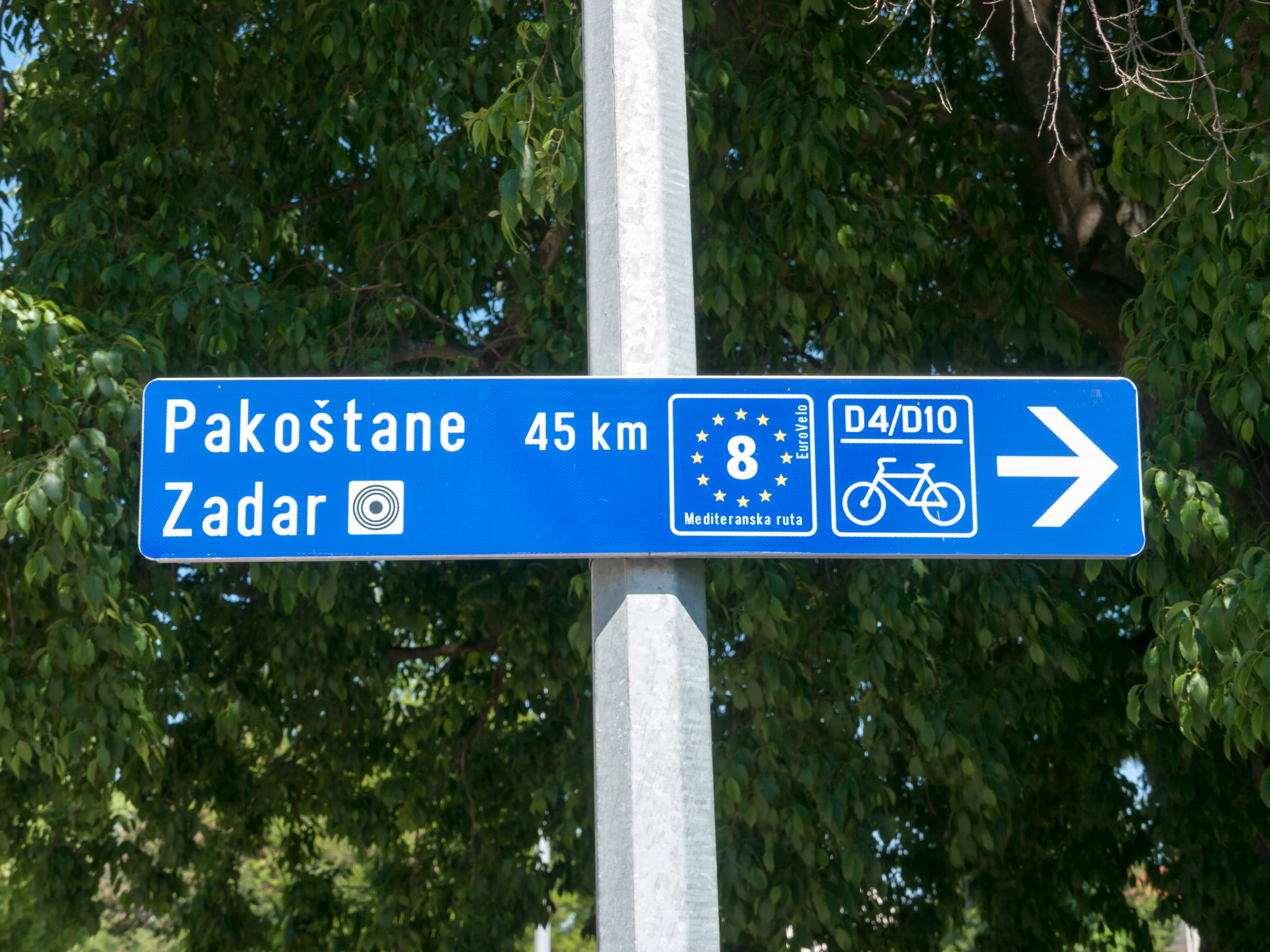
EV8 sign in Zadar, Croatia

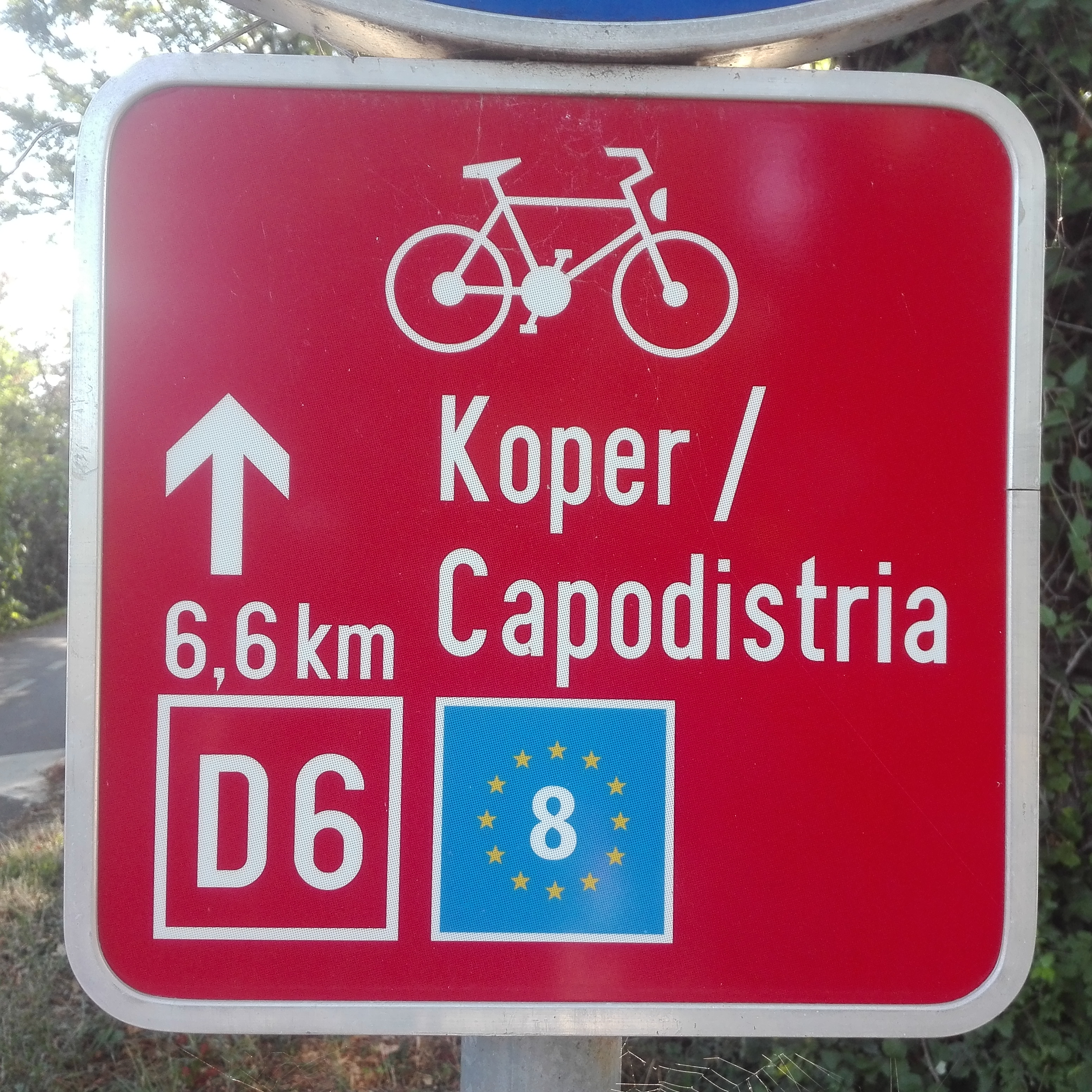
EV8 sign in Slovenia

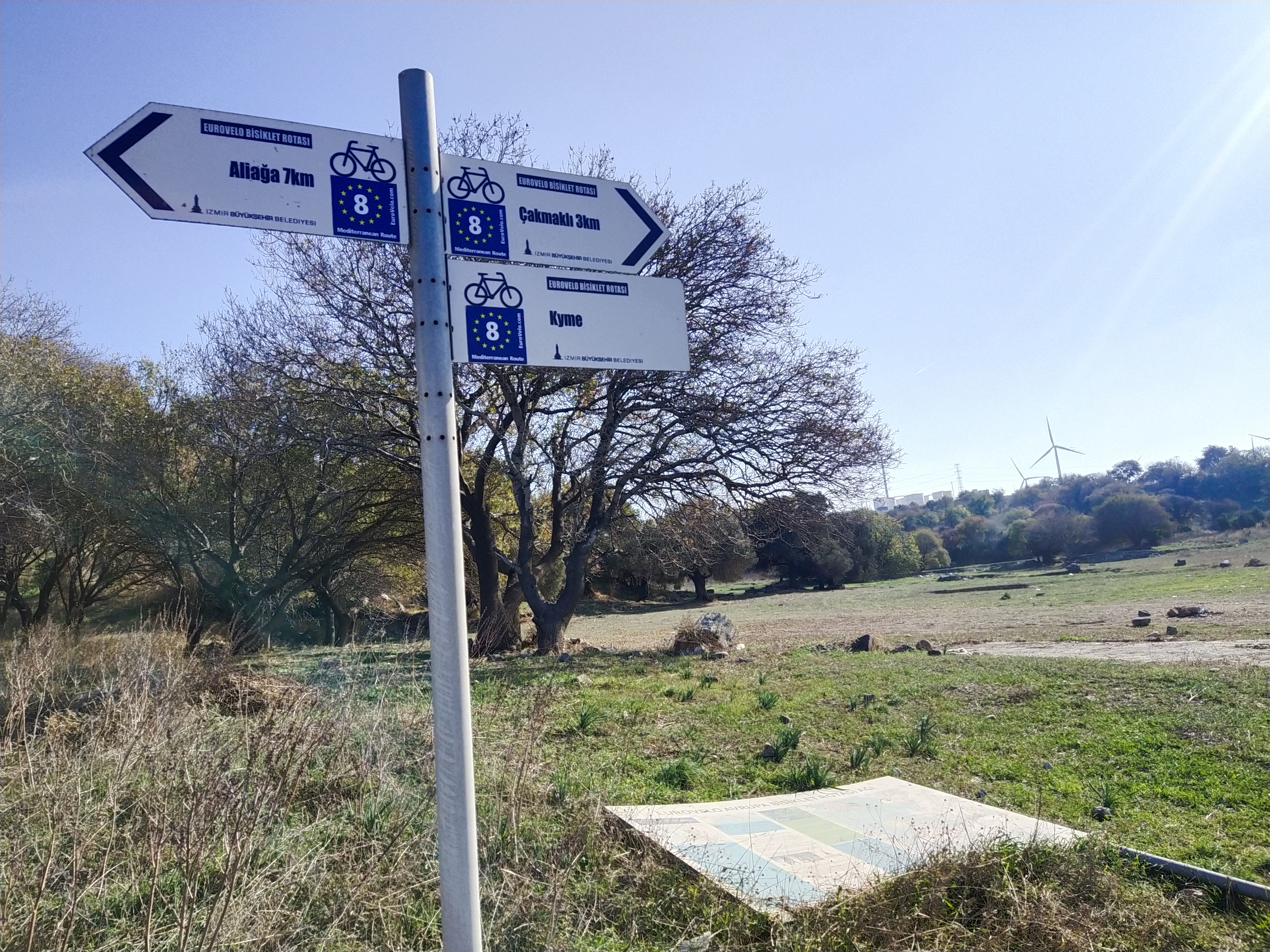
EV8 sign in ancient Aeolis city Cyme in İzmir Province, Turkey
