= National cycling route network =

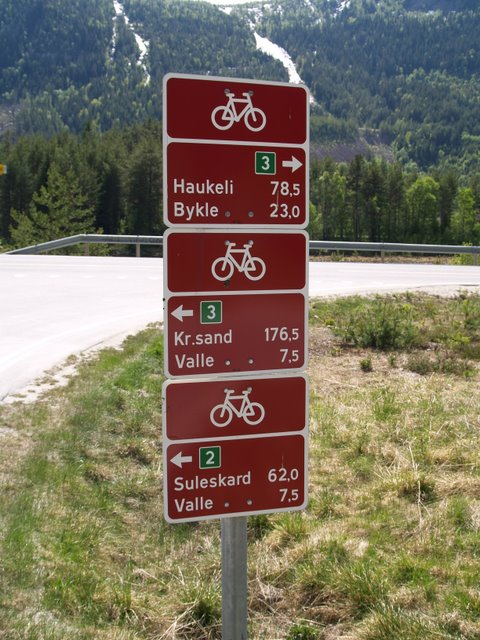
Signpost at an intersection of Norwegian National Cycle Routes 2 and 3

A national cycling route network is a nationwide network of designated long-distance cycling routes found in various countries around the world for the purposes of bicycle tourism. They are often created and maintained by the government of the country, or at least with the backing or co-operation of the government of the country. Some of the routes in these national networks can be part of international long-distance cycling routes, such as the EuroVelo network of European cycling routes.

Examples of these national networks are the Dutch LF-routes, the routes of the British National Cycle Network, and the USA's United States Bicycle Route System.

- Europe
  - Belgium: RAVeL network in Wallonie && LF-routes in Flanders
  - Denmark: the 11 Danish National Cycle Routes
  - Germany: the German Cycling Network consisting of 12 so-called D-Routes
  - Italy: (a proposed network, BicItalia)
  - France: (a proposed network, Les Véloroutes et Voies Vertes de France)
  - The Netherlands: the 26 Dutch National Cycle Routes, the so-called LF-routes
  - Norway: the 10 routes of the Norwegian National Cycle Routes network
  - Sweden: The 15 main routes of the Sverigeleden (Sweden Route) and their branch routes
  - Switzerland: A network of 9 routes, the Swiss National Bike Routes
  - United Kingdom: the National Cycle Network, of 10 primary routes and scores of secondary routes
- North America
  - United States Bicycle Route System

== See also ==
- Cycling network

Organizing bodies:

- Adventure Cycling Association
- National Association of City Transportation Officials

Muli-modal road safety:

- Assured clear distance ahead
- Cycling infrastructure

Contrasting international system:

- Numbered-node cycle network, road marking system which encourages users to take arbitrary routes
