= German Cycling Network =

Network of cycle routes in Germany

Logo of Radnetz Deutschland

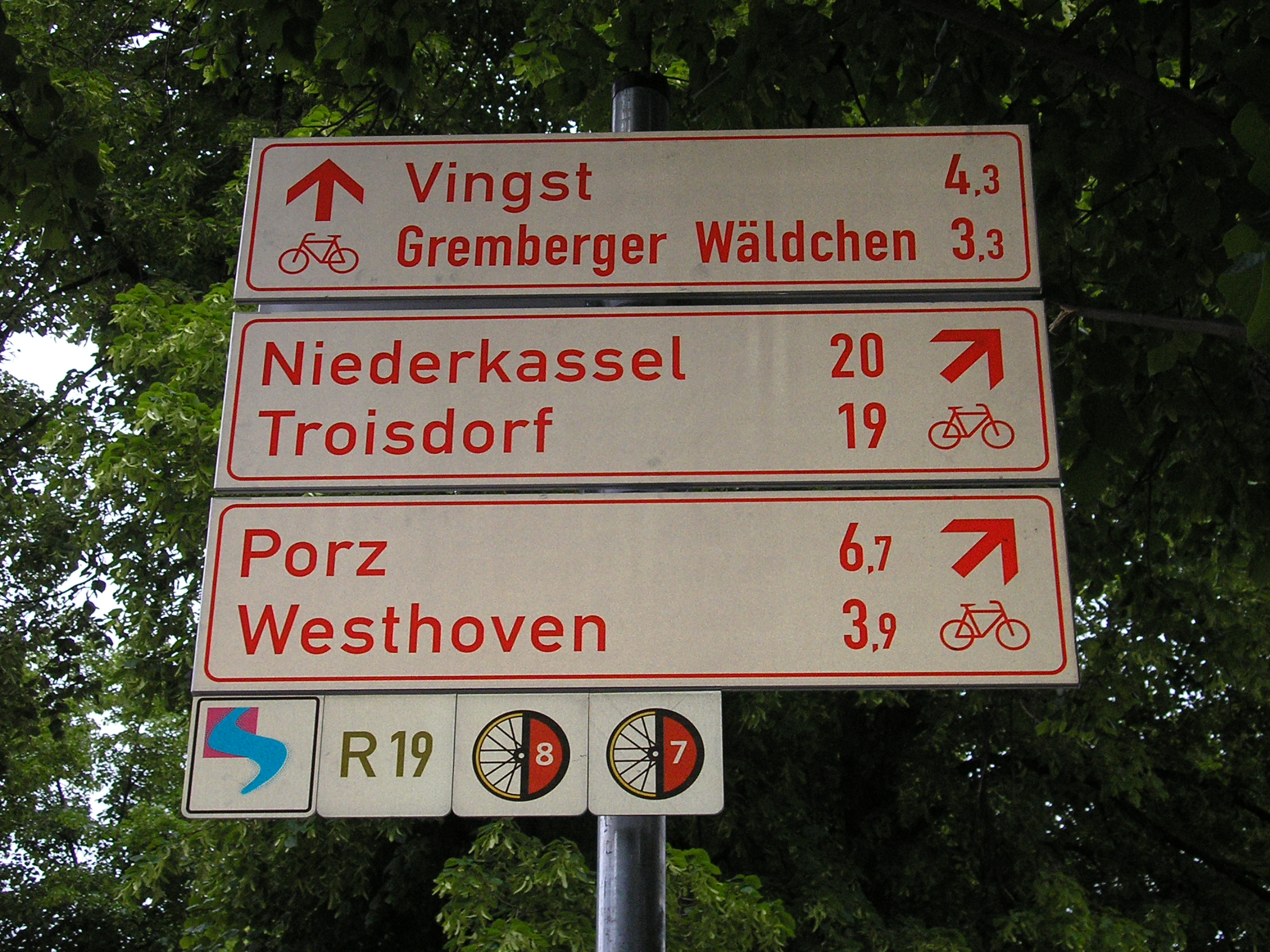
Signposting for D-Routes 7 and 8, near Cologne.

The German Cycling Network (German: Radnetz Deutschland) is the national cycling route network of Germany. There are currently 14 such long-distance cycling routes, called D-Routes (the "D" stands for "Deutschland’" i.e. Germany) criss-crossing the German nation and these were established mainly to promote bicycle tourism, but also to improve everyday cycling.

Part of the German Nationaler Radverkehrsplan (National Cycling Plan), the project to establish the German Cycling Network ran over a 10 year period, from 2002 to 2012.

== D-Routes ==
D-Route	Name	Details	Length
1	Nordseeküstenroute (North Sea Coast Route)	Along the North Sea coast from the Dutch border to the Danish border. Forms part of EuroVelo 12, the North Sea Cycle Route.	907 km
2	Ostseeküstenroute (Baltic Sea Coast Route)	Along the Baltic Sea coast from Flensburg, across the islands of Rügen and Usedom, to the Polish border. Forms part of the EuroVelo 10 route.	1055 km
3	Europaroute (Europe Route)	From the Dutch border, through Münster, Goslar, Potsdam and Berlin, to the River Oder. Forms part of the EuroVelo 2 route.	960 km
4	Mittellandroute (Central States Route)	Passes east-west through the middle of Germany, from Aachen, through to Bonn, Siegen, Erfurt, Jena, Chemnitz and Dresden to Zittau.	1045 km
5	Saar-Mosel-Main (The Saar-Mosel-Main Route)	Follows the courses of the rivers Saar, Mosel & Main from Saarbrücken, through to Trier, Koblenz, Mainz, Frankfurt am Main, Würzburg and Bayreuth to the Czech border.	1021 km
6	Donauroute (Danube Route)	From the Dreiländereck (the tripoint of Germany, France, and Switzerland) near Basel, through Ulm and Regensburg to Passau. Forms part of the EuroVelo 6 route.	733 km
7	Pilgerroute (Pilgrim's Route)	From Aachen, through Cologne, Düsseldorf, Duisburg, Münster, Osnabrück, Bremen and Hamburg to Flensburg on the North Sea coast. Forms part of the EuroVelo 3 route.	1189 km
8	Rheinradweg (Rhine Route)	Follows the River Rhine from Lake Constance to the Dutch border. Forms part of the EuroVelo 15 route.	1019 km
9	Weser-Romantische Straße (Weser – Romantic Road Route)	Follows the bike path on the River Weser and then along the Romantic Road, from the North Sea, through to Bremen, Kassel and Fulda to Füssen im Allgäu.	1197 km
10	Elberadweg (River Elbe Route)	Along the River Elbe from the Czech border near Schmilka, through to Dresden, Dessau, Magdeburg and Hamburg to the river's mouth in the North Sea at Cuxhaven.	1328 km
11	Ostsee–Oberbayern (Baltic Sea to Upper Bavaria Route)	From Rostock on the Baltic Sea, through to Berlin, Dessau, Halle, Jena, Hof, Bayreuth, Bamberg, Nürnberg, Landshut, München and Rosenheim, then over the border to Salzburg in Austria. Forms part of the EuroVelo 7 route.	1697 km
12	Oder-Neiße-Radweg (Rivers Oder & Neisse Route)	Follows the courses of the rivers Oder & Neisse along the German-Polish border from the Baltic Sea to the Zittau Mountains.	630 km
13	Iron Curtain Trail	Eurovelo EV13 integrated inside Germany. From polish Border, along the Baltic Sea coast and following the former inner German border and European Green Belt between former East and West Germany.	1587 km
(-)	Radweg Deutsche Einheit (Cycling route German Unity)	Crosses Germany from west to east; From former west german capital Bonn to todays capital Berlin.	1175 km

== Expansion ==
In the summer of 2012, in the Nationale Radverkehrsplan 2020 (National Cycling Plan 2020), it was decided that the German sections of the Iron Curtain Trail (which is international, known as EuroVelo 13) would be included as part of the German Cycling Network. This was done officially in June 2025 as Route D13. Also the "Radweg Deutsche Einheit" was included, but as of 2026 still without a route number.

== See also ==
- EuroVelo
- Cycling network
- LF-routes, the national cycling route network of the Netherlands.
- National Cycle Network, the national cycling route network of the United Kingdom.
