= EV13 The Iron Curtain Trail =

European cycling route

Route of EV13, the Iron Curtain Trail.

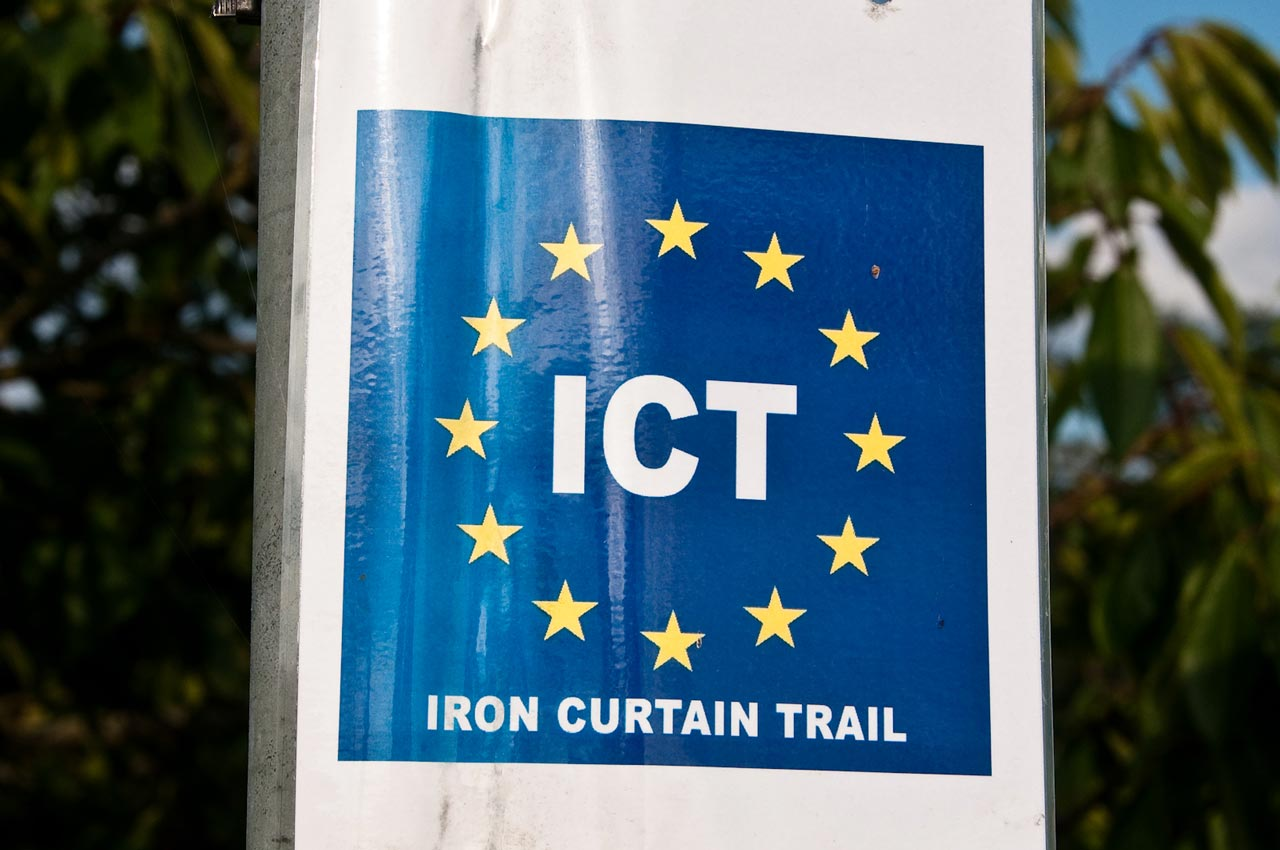
Iron Curtain Trail signpost

The Iron Curtain Trail (ICT), also known as EuroVelo 13 (EV13), is a long-distance cycling route along the route of the former Iron Curtain, from the Barents Sea to the Black Sea. It is 10,550 km long. During the Cold War (c. 1947-1991), the Iron Curtain delineated the border between the Communist East and the capitalist West, with the East being the Warsaw Pact countries of the Soviet bloc and the West being the countries of NATO.

The ICT can also be walked as a long-distance trail.

== Overview ==
Many parts of the ICT were completed by 2013, particularly in the central section, such as most of the German section and along the Czech border. Some parts e.g. Saxony-Anhalt are still lacking the official route markers and symbols on bicycle sign posts (2025).

The Iron Curtain Trail, which is closely related to the European Green Belt project, was managed as three projects:

- The northern part is over 4,127 km (2,564 mi) in length from the Barents Sea, along the Finnish-Russian border, along the Baltic Coast, to the German-Polish border.
- The central section passes straight through Germany, following the old border between East Germany and West Germany. It then follows the current borders of the Czech Republic—Austria, Austria—Slovakia, Austria–Hungary and Slovenia for a distance of 2,179 km (1,354 mi).
- The southern part travels 1,335 km (830 mi) along the borders of Croatia, Serbia, Romania, Bulgaria, Macedonia, Greece and Turkey to the Black Sea.

== Development ==
20 countries are part of the Iron Curtain Trail project, among them are 14 members of the European Union.

The ICT was lobbied for by German Green Party politician Michael Cramer MEP. Trails have been created and made better suited to cycling with help and finance from the European Union, with historical signposts and markers erected.

== See also ==
- Iron Curtain
- European Green Belt
- EuroVelo
- German Cycling Network
