= EV14 =

EV14 may refer to:

- EV14 Waters of Central Europe, a EuroVelo international cycle route
- Eurovision Song Contest 2014, a song festival
