= Swiss National Bike Routes =

Network of cycle routes in Switzerland

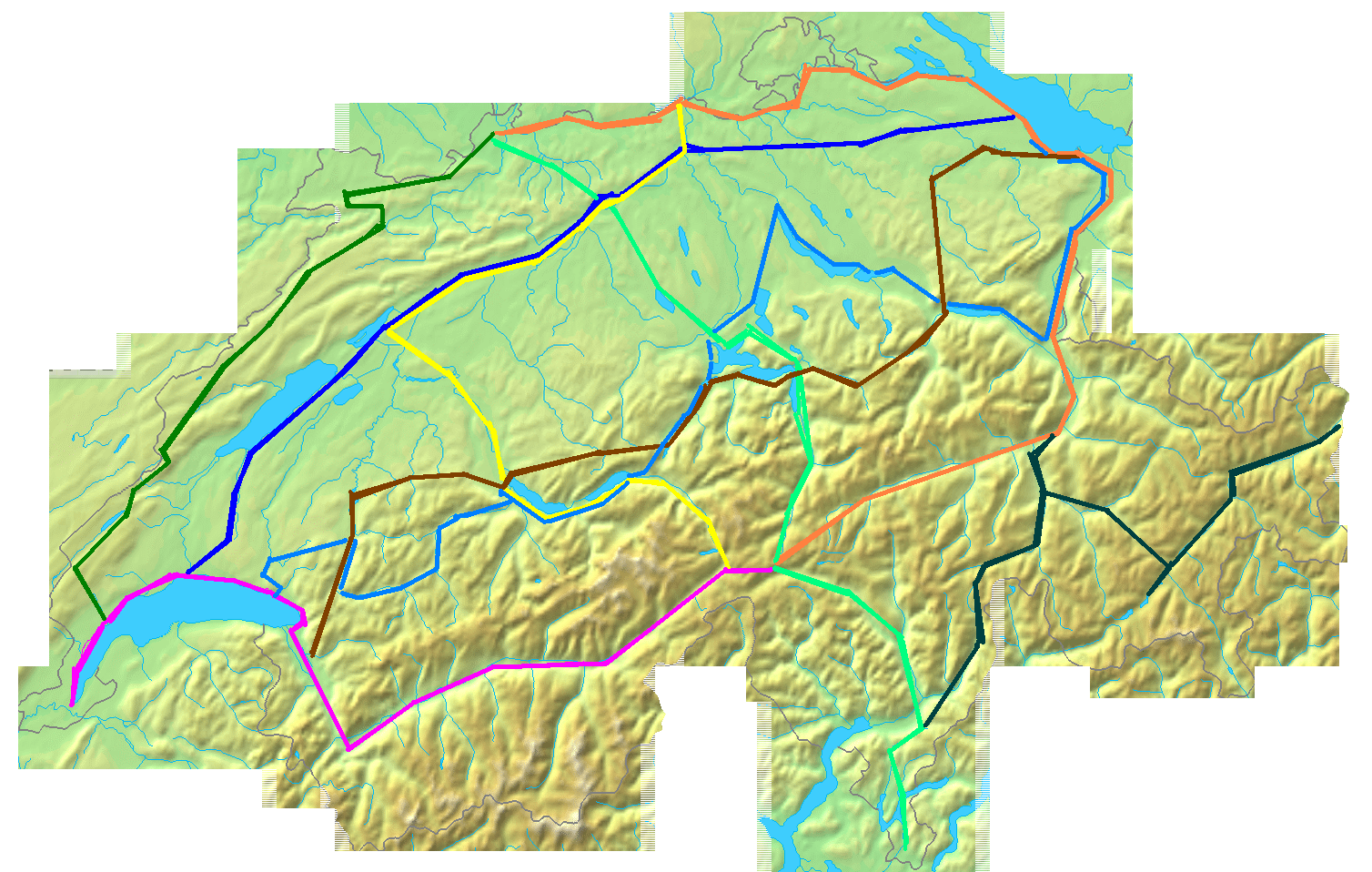
Map of Switzerland's national bike routes Rhône Route Rhine Route North–South Route Alpine Panorama Route Mittelland Route Graubünden Route Jura Route Aare Route Lakes Route

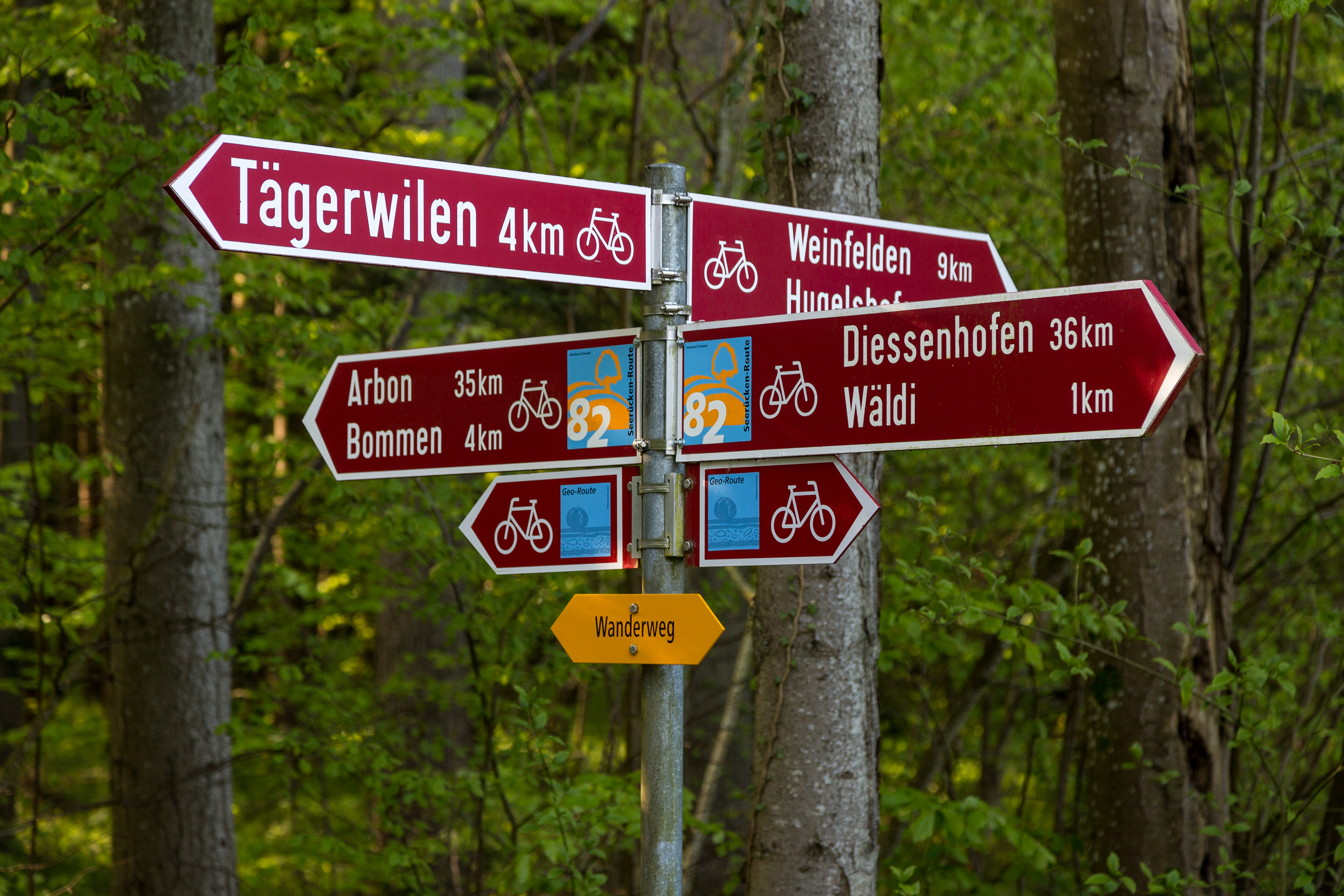
Signs

The Swiss National Bike Routes (German: Nationale Velorouten, French: Itinéraires à vélo nationaux, Italian: Percorsi nazionali) are the national cycling route network of Switzerland. There are currently nine such long-distance cycling routes criss-crossing the Swiss nation and these were established mainly to promote bicycle tourism.

The routes are signposted with red signposts. National routes are characterized by single-digit numbers to tell them apart from the Swiss regional routes. Each national route is published in a guidebook in German and French with map sections at 1:100 000 scale with technical and tourist information.

Nine national and many regional routes were established. The nine national routes are:

1. Rhône Route: Andermatt – Geneva, 309 km (192 mi), of which 26 km (16 mi) is unpaved road, 4,360 metres (14,300 ft) of altitude
2. Rhine Route: Andermatt – Oberalp Pass – Chur – Schaffhausen – Basel, 424 km (263 mi)
3. North–South Route: Basel – Chiasso, 363 km (226 mi)
4. Alpine Panorama Route: St. Margrethen – Aigle, 483 km (300 mi)
5. Mittelland Route: Romanshorn – Lausanne, 369 km (229 mi)
6. Graubünden Route: Chur – Bellinzona, 260 km (160 mi)
7. Jura Route: Basel – Nyon, 275 km (171 mi)
8. Aare Route: Oberwald – Koblenz, 305 km (190 mi)
9. Lakes Route: Montreux – Rorschach, 497 km (309 mi)

Note that, these routes often follow paved roads and paths, but they also contain sections that are not yet paved. Only the Route 4 (Alpine Panorama Route) is paved throughout.

== See also ==
- EuroVelo
- LF-routes, the national cycling route network of the Netherlands.
- National Cycle Network, the national cycling route network of the United Kingdom.
- Transport in Switzerland
