= Cycling network =

Interconnected network of cycle routes

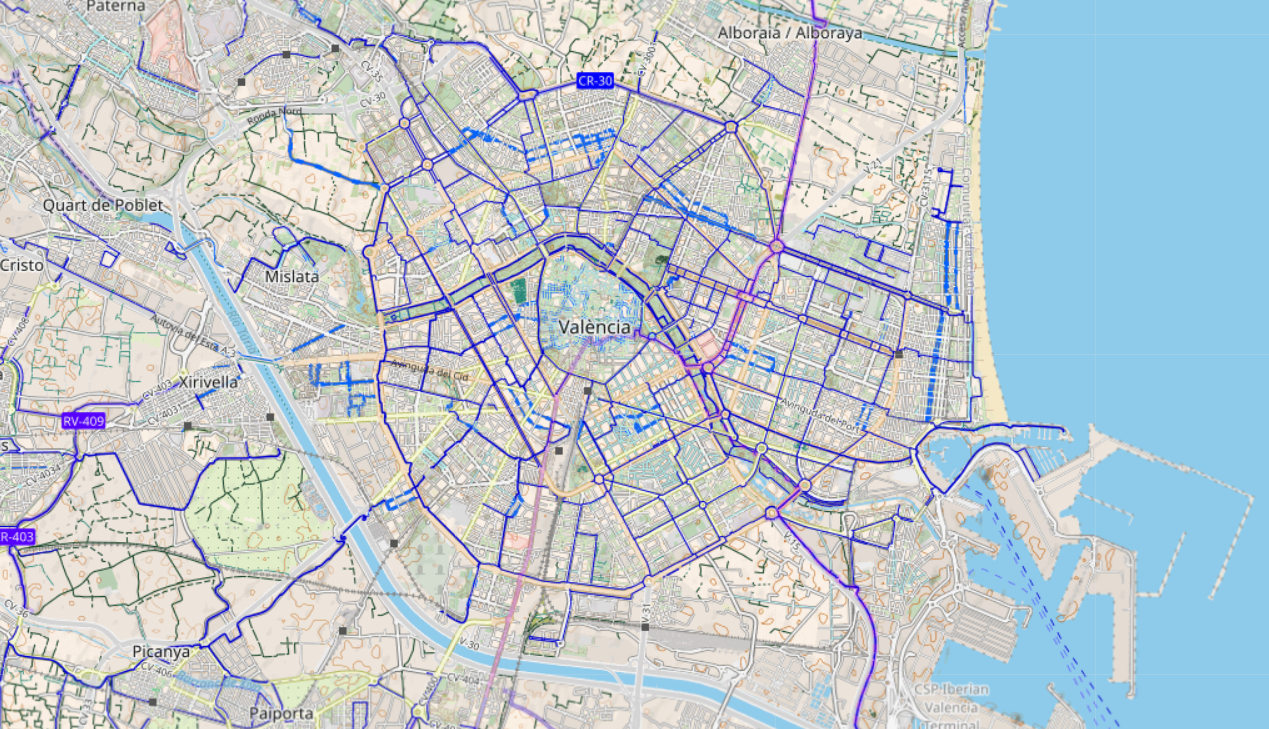
Cycling network of Valencia.

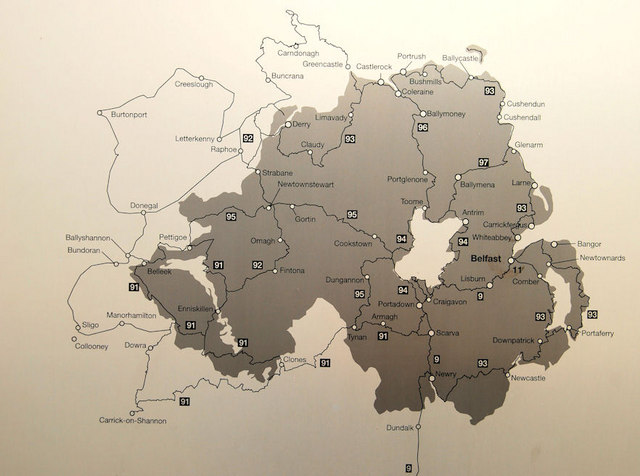
Cycling network of Northern Ireland.

European cycling network.

A cycling, cycle, bicycle or bike network is the set of interconnected bikeways within a territory. It is composed of all routes adapted for bicycle traffic, as well as all supporting facilities that make bicycle use functional, such as parking areas, repair stations, or bike-sharing systems.

Among the objectives of cycling networks are enabling everyday travel, promoting bicycle touring, improving public health, increasing road safety, reducing pollution and noise, and improving traffic flow.

The planning of a cycling network should be based on criteria of safety, connectivity, and directness. This means that the different routes should offer maximum safety for cyclists of any age, gender, or level of experience, ideally through segregated cycling infrastructure.

These cycling routes must be interconnected and should allow access to key destinations such as educational centers, commercial areas, public transport stations, or residential neighborhoods, covering as much territory as possible.

Finally, bicycles are powered by human physical effort, so trips should be as direct as possible and avoid steep slopes.

== See also ==
- Active mobility
- Cyclability
- Cycling infrastructure
- Right to mobility
- Utility cycling
