= LF-routes =

Network of cycle routes in the Netherlands and Belgium

LF-Routes (Landelijke Fietsroutes, Dutch for countrywide cycling routes) are long-distance cycling routes that form a network in the Netherlands and Belgium. The routes, criss-crossing both countries, are primarily intended for recreational multi-day bike tours, such as cycling holidays. Some routes are also part of a wider international network.

Most of the LF routes have been signposted in two directions, inscribing one direction with the letter "a", the other with the letter "b": the North Sea Route LF1 southbound from Den Helder to French Boulogne-sur-Mer is called LF1a, while in the other direction it is called LF1b.

== History ==
In 1987, Dutch cyclists' organisations founded a "countrywide cycling platform" to create a network of long-distance cycling routes throughout the Netherlands. This platform published maps and guides and started signposting its routes in 1990.

Belgium introduced its first long-distance route, not yet called "LF" by that time, in 1964: it connected youth hostels and was therefore called Jeugdherbergenroute, which later became the LF50. Belgium signposted its first LF-route in 1990 as well (the LF1 North Sea Route) and two years later, the GR organisation took over the planning of Belgian LF-routes.

At the maximum extent, both countries had created a network of 36 routes, of which 5 were only in Belgium, 15 in the Netherlands and 16 in both. Some routes also extend into France and Germany. However, due to the expansion of the numbered-node cycle network, Belgium reduced its official network in 2012 (routes marked (Note: In a major network revision in 2012, these routes were taken out of the official network: "Geel-blauw verdwijnt". groteroutepaden.be (in Dutch). 1 September 2012. Archived from the original on 18 February 2017.)) and the Netherlands is doing the same between 2017 and 2021 (routes marked (Note: In a major network revision between 2017 and 2021, these routes will be taken out of the official network: "LF routes to undergo overhaul". Holland-cycling.com. 9 December 2016.)).

== Routes ==
| Route number | Name | Start & end points | Length | Connections |
|---|---|---|---|---|
| LF1 | Noordzeeroute (North Sea Route) | Den Helder - Boulogne-sur-Mer (France) | 470 km | Callantsoog: LF10; Schoorl: LF7; Haarlem: LF20; The Hague: LF4, LF11; Hook of Holland: LF12; Flushing: LF13; Breskens: LF30, LF39; Sluis: LF51; Damme: LF5; Blankenberge: LF52; Ostend: LF511; Veurne: LF6; Diksmuide: LF6, LF53 |
| LF2 | Stedenroute (Cities' Route) | Amsterdam - Brussels | 337 km | Amsterdam: LF7, LF20, LF21, LF23; Alphen aan den Rijn: LF4; Rotterdam: LF11; Dordrecht: LF11, LF12; Moerdijk: LF11; Roosendaal: LF13, LF50; Antwerp: LF51; Boom: LF5, LF56; Leuven: LF6, LF57, RVU; Brussels: LF56, RV1, RV4, RV10 |
| LF3 | Rietlandroute (Reed bed Route); Hanzeroute (Hanseatic League Route); Maasroute (River Maas Route) | Holwerd - Kampen; Kampen - Millingen aan de Rijn; Millingen - Maastricht | 535 km | Holwerd: LF10, ferry to Ameland; Heerenveen: LF20; Kampen: LF15, LF22, LF23; Zwolle: LF9, LF15, LF16; Deventer: LF19; Bronkhorst: LF4; Arnhem: LF4; Groesbeek: LF12; Venlo: LF13; Roermond: LF5; Maastricht: LF6, RV7 |
| LF4 | Midden-Nederlandroute (Middle of the Netherlands Route) | The Hague - Enschede | 290 km | The Hague: LF1, LF11; Alphen aan den Rijn: LF2; Utrecht: LF7, LF9; Doorn: LF17; Arnhem: LF3; Bronkhorst: LF3; Borculo: LF8; Enschede: LF14, LF15 |
| LF5 | Vlaanderen Fietsroute (Flanders Cycle Route) (North) | Damme - Roermond | 320 km | Damme: LF1; Bruges: LF511; Aalter: LF39; Ghent: LF30, LF53; Dendermonde: LF38; Temse: LF38; Boom: LF2, LF56; Lier: LF550; Zandhoven: LF50, LF51, LF557; Zoersel: LF9, LF50, LF557; Turnhout: LF35; Mol: LF35; Lommel: LF51; Neerpelt: LF57; Thorn: LF7, LF58; Roermond: LF3 |
| LF6 | Vlaanderen Fietsroute (South) | Diksmuide - Aachen (Germany) | 400 km | Diksmuide: LF1, LF53; Ypres: LF39; Kortrijk: LF52; Bossuit: RV8; Kluisbergen: LF30, RV8; Geraardsbergen: LF38, RV3; Halle: RV1; Uccle: RV10; Huldenberg: RV4; Leuven: LF2, LF57, RVU; Hoegaarden: RV2; Zoutleeuw: LF35; Riemst: LF50; Kanne: LF7; Maastricht: LF3, RV7 |
| LF7 | Oeverlandroute (River Bank Route) | Schoorl - Maastricht | 435 km | Schoorl: LF1; Alkmaar: LF15; Amsterdam: LF2, LF20, LF21, LF23; Utrecht: LF4, LF9; Leerdam: LF17; 's-Hertogenbosch: LF12; Best: LF13; Eindhoven: LF51; Mierlo: LF13; Thorn: LF5, LF58; Kanne: LF6 |
| LF8 | n/a | Ommen - Winterswijk | 100 km | Ommen: LF14, LF16; Holten: LF15, LF19; Borculo: LF4 |
| LF9 | NAP-route (Amsterdam Ordnance Datum Route) | Bad Nieuweschans - Zoersel | 505 km | Bad Nieuweschans: LF10; Groningen: LF14, LF20; Zwolle: LF3, LF15, LF16; Elburg: LF23; Spakenburg: LF23; Utrecht: LF4, LF7; Gorinchem: LF17; Woudrichem: LF12; Breda: LF11, LF13; Loenhout: LF50; Zoersel: LF5, LF50, LF557 |
| LF10 | Waddenzeeroute (Wadden Sea Route) | Callantsoog - Bad Nieuweschans | 275 km | Callantsoog: LF1; Den Oever: LF21; Kornwerderzand: LF21, LF22; Holwerd: LF3; Lauwersoog: LF14, ferry to Schiermonnikoog; Bad Nieuweschans: LF9 |
| LF11 | Prinsenroute (Princes' Route) | The Hague - Breda | 125 km | The Hague: LF1, LF4; Vlaardingen: LF12; Rotterdam: LF2; Dordrecht: LF2, LF12; Moerdijk: LF2; Breda: LF9, LF13 |
| LF12 | Maas- en Vestingroute (River Maas and Fortresses Route) | Hook of Holland - Groesbeek | 220 km | Hook of Holland: LF1; Vlaardingen: LF11; Dordrecht: LF2, LF11; Woudrichem: LF9; 's-Hertogenbosch: LF7; Groesbeek: LF3 |
| LF13 | Schelde-Rheinroute (Scheldt-Rhine Route) | Flushing - Venlo | 290 km | Flushing: LF1; Roosendaal: LF2, LF50; Breda: LF9, LF11; Alphen: LF35; Best: LF7; Mierlo: LF7; Venlo: LF3 |
| LF14 | Saksenroute (Saxons' Route) | Lauwersoog - Enschede | 240 km | Lauwersoog: LF10, ferry to Schiermonnikoog; Groningen: LF9, LF20; Hardenberg: LF16; Ommen: LF8, LF16; Enschede: LF4, LF15 |
| LF15 | Boerenlandroute (Farmland Route) | Alkmaar - Enschede | 260 km | Alkmaar: LF7; Enkhuizen: LF21; Lelystad: LF20; Kampen: LF3, LF22, LF23; Zwolle: LF9, LF16; Holten: LF8, LF19; Enschede: LF4, LF14 |
| LF16 | Vechtdalroute (Vecht Valley Route) | Zwolle - Darfeld (Germany) | 230 km | Zwolle: LF9, LF15; Ommen: LF8, LF14; Hardenberg: LF14 |
| LF17 | n/a | Gorinchem - Doorn | 60 km | Gorinchem: LF9; Leerdam: LF7; Doorn: LF4 |
| LF19 | n/a | Deventer - Holten | 35 km | Deventer: LF3; Holten: LF8, LF15 |
| LF20 | Flevoroute | Haarlem - Groningen | 265 km | Haarlem: LF1; Amsterdam: LF2, LF7, LF21, LF23; Naarden: LF23; Lelystad: LF15; Lemmer: LF22; Heerenveen: LF3; Groningen: LF9, LF14 |
| LF21 | Zuiderzeeroute (West) | Amsterdam - Afsluitdijk | 150 km | Amsterdam: LF2, LF7, LF20, LF23; Enkhuizen: LF15; Den Oever: LF10; Kornwerderzand: LF10, LF22 |
| LF22 | Zuiderzeeroute (East) | Afsluitdijk - Kampen | 130 km | Kornwerderzand: LF10; Lemmer: LF20; Kampen: LF3, LF15, LF23 |
| LF23 | Zuiderzeeroute (South) | Kampen - Amsterdam | 130 km | Kampen: LF3, LF15, LF22; Elburg: LF9; Spakenburg: LF9; Naarden: LF20; Amsterdam: LF2, LF7, LF20, LF21 |
| LF30 | Schelde-Deltaroute (Scheldt-Delta Works route) | Breskens - Kluisbergen | 150 km | Breskens: LF1, LF39; Hulst: LF38; Wachtebeke: LF51; Ghent: LF5, LF53; Kluisbergen: LF6, RV8 |
| LF35 | Kempen-Haspengouwroute (Campine-Hesbaye Route) | Tilburg - Zoutleeuw | 128 km | Alphen: LF13; Turnhout: LF5; Mol: LF5; Dessel: LF51; Diest: LF50, LF57, LF58; Zoutleeuw: LF6 |
| LF38 | Dender-Waaslandroute | Hulst - Geraardsbergen | 100 km | Sint-Gillis-Waas: LF51; Temse: LF5; Dendermonde: LF5; Geraardsbergen: LF6, RV3 |
| LF39 | Flandriensroute | Breskens - Wattignies (France) | 203 km | Breskens: LF1, LF30; Kaprijke: LF51; Aalter: LF5; Tielt: LF52, LF53; Ypres: LF6 |
| LF50 | Jeugdherbergenroute (Youth Hostel Route) | Bergen op Zoom - Voeren | 237 km | Roosendaal: LF2, LF13; Loenhout: LF9; Zoersel: LF5, LF9, LF557; Zandhoven: LF5, LF51, LF557; Nijlen: LF550, LF557; Diest: LF35, LF57, LF58; Riemst: LF6; Visé: RV7; Voeren: RV4 |
| LF51 | Kempenroute (Campine Route); Gravejansroute (Earl John's Route) | Eindhoven - Antwerp; Antwerp - Zeebrugge | 120 km +126 km | Eindhoven: LF7; Valkenswaard: LF57; Lommel: LF5; Dessel: LF35; Zandhoven: LF5, LF50, LF557; Antwerp: LF2; Sint-Gillis-Waas: LF38; Wachtebeke: LF30; Kaprijke: LF39; Sint-Laureins: LF511; Sluis: LF1; Zeebrugge: LF52 |
| LF52 | Guldensporenroute (Golden Spurs Route) | Zeebrugge - Kortrijk | 128 km | Zeebrugge: LF51; Blankenberge: LF1; Jabbeke: LF511; Tielt: LF39, LF53; Kortrijk: LF6 |
| LF53 | Artevelderoute | De Panne - Ghent | 134 km | De Panne: LF511; Diksmuide: LF1, LF6; Tielt: LF39, LF52; Ghent: LF5, LF30 |
| LF56 | n/a | Boom - Halle | 48 km | Boom: LF2, LF5; Brussels: LF56, RV1, RV4, RV10; Halle: LF6, RV1 |
| LF57 | Spiekelspaderoute (Note: Named after Spiekelspade, a former hamlet in Hechtel-Eksel) | Leuven - Valkenswaard | 101 km | Leuven: LF2, LF6, RVU; Sint-Joris-Winge: LF557; Diest: LF35, LF50, LF58; Neerpelt: LF5; Valkenswaard: LF51 |
| LF58 | Donderslagroute | Diest - Thorn | ? km | Diest: LF35, LF50; Thorn: LF5, LF7; Valkenswaard: LF51 |
| LF511 | Gravejansroute | De Panne - Sint-Laureins | 83 km | De Panne: LF53; Ostend: LF1; Jabbeke: LF52; Bruges: LF5; Sint-Laureins: LF51 |
| LF550 | Verbindingsroute (Link route) | Lier - Nijlen | 7 km | Lier: LF5; Nijlen: LF50 |
| LF557 | Troonroute (Throne route) | Zoersel - Sint-Joris-Winge | 50 km | Zoersel: LF5, LF9, LF50; Zandhoven: LF5, LF50, LF51, LF557; Sint-Joris-Winge: LF57 |

=== Tours from combined LF-Routes ===
Although a network like the Belgo-Dutch LF routes enable almost endless combinations of sections, a few themed routes have been officially established:

| Name | Description | Start & end points | Length |
|---|---|---|---|
| Nederlandse Kustroute (Dutch Coastal Route) | Dutch sections of the LF1 and LF10 form the Dutch section of EuroVelo 12, the North Sea Cycle Route. | Sluis - Bad Nieuweschans | 570 km |
| Maasfietsroute (Maas River cycle route) | LF3, LF12, (LF2, LF11) | Maastricht - Hook of Holland | 430 km |
| Rijnfietsroute (Rhine River Cycle Route) | Sections of the LF12, LF11, LF17, LF4 and LF3. It is part of EuroVelo 15 (the International Rhine Cycle Route) which takes you through Germany, France and Switzerland to the source of the River Rhine. | Millingen - Hook of Holland | 270 km LF6 and LF7. || (tour) || 600 km |
| Zuiderzeeroute | LF21, LF22 and LF23 form the Zuiderzee Route (Zuiderzeeroute) | (tour) | 405 km |
| Vlaanderen Fietsroute (Tour of the Flemish region) | A round tour of the Flemish region, consisting of sections of the LF1, LF5, | | |
| Ronde van Nederland (Tour of the Netherlands) | A round tour of the Netherlands following sections of LF routes closest to the border: LF1, LF10, LF14, LF16, LF4, LF3, LF7, LF13. | (tour) | 1300 km |
| Rondje Twente (Tour of Twente) | Sections of the LF14, LF15 and LF8. | (tour) | 175 km |

== See also ==
- Numbered-node cycle network, this uses an alternative signage system, thus facilitating users in choosing their own personalised routes
- EuroVelo
- German Cycling Network, the national cycling route network of Germany
- National Cycle Network, the national cycling route network of the United Kingdom
