= EuroVelo =

European cycling network

- Logo

System information
- Length: 55,923 mi (89,999 km)
- Formed: 1995

Highway names
- EuroVelo: EV nn

System links
- International E-road network; A Class; B Class

EuroVelo is a network of 17 long-distance cycling routes criss-crossing Europe, with 2 more in early construction across various stages of completion. When completed, the EuroVelo network's total length will be almost 60,875 km (37,826 mi). As of 2023 more than 56,000 km (35,000 mi) were in place. EuroVelo is a project of the European Cyclists' Federation (ECF). The multinational project aims to connect 40 countries via the 19 unique routes across the European continent.

EuroVelo routes can be used for bicycle touring across the continent, as well as by local people making short journeys. The routes are made of both existing national bike routes — such as the Dutch LF-Routes, the German D-Routes, the French véloroute "SN3V" and the British National Cycle Network — and existing general purpose roads, together with new stretches of cycle routes to connect them.

== History ==
The idea of creating a network of international cycle routes spanning Europe started in 1995. It was initially coordinated by the ECF, De Frie Fugle (Denmark) and Sustrans (UK) and the original plan was to create 12 long-distance cycling routes.

Since August 2007, the ECF has assumed full responsibility for the project. Despite sometimes tight financial constraints, the EuroVelo project has already begun to fulfil the vision of its founders with sections of the network being implemented in countries as far apart as Finland, Cyprus, Spain and the UK. In addition, the EuroVelo brand has become widely known.

There have been various changes to the network over the years, most notably the addition of two new routes — EuroVelo 13 (the Iron Curtain Trail) and EuroVelo 15 (the Rhine Cycle Route) — in September 2011, which are the longest and shortest of the EuroVelo routes.

== Future expansion ==
In September 2023, the ECF announced that the Iberian Cycle route connecting Lisbon with Pamplona via Madrid is set to become the future EuroVelo 16 route by 2028 with a length of 1,896 km.

== Main points on the EuroVelo routes ==
Route number	Route name	Passes through these cities	Through these countries	Length	
Route number	Route name	Passes through these cities	Through these countries	km	mi
EV1	Atlantic Coast Route	North Cape (EV7, EV11) - Tromsø - Vestvågøy - Trondheim (EV3) - Bergen (EV12) - Aberdeen (EV12) - Inverness (EV12 ) - Glasgow - Stranraer - Belfast - Lisburn - Strabane - Derry - Sligo - Galway (EV2) - Limerick - Waterville - Cork - Rosslare - Fishguard - Newport - Bristol (EV2) - Plymouth - Roscoff (EV4) - Nantes (EV6) - La Rochelle - Arcachon - Bayonne - Hendaye - Irun - Pamplona (EV3) - Burgos - Valladolid - Salamanca - Cáceres - Ayamonte - Faro - Sagres - Lisbon - Porto - Caminha	Norway, United Kingdom, Ireland, France, Spain, Portugal	10,650	6,620
EV2	Capitals Route	Galway (EV1) - Athlone - Dublin - Holyhead - Bristol (EV1) - Bath - Reading - London (EV12) - Harwich - Hoek van Holland (EV12, EV15, EV19) - The Hague (EV12) - Utrecht - Münster (EV3) - Dessau - Berlin (EV7) - Poznań (EV9) - Warsaw (EV11) - Minsk - Moscow	Ireland, United Kingdom, Netherlands, Germany, Poland, Belarus, Russia	5,050	3,140
EV3	Pilgrims Route	Trondheim (EV1) - Lillehammer - Oslo - Halden - Strömstad - Gothenburg (EV12) - Frederikshavn (EV12) - Aalborg - Viborg - Vejen - Padborg - Flensburg - Hamburg (EV12) - Münster (EV2) - Wesel (EV15) - Düsseldorf (EV4) - Cologne - Aachen - Liège (EV19) - Namur (EV5, EV19) - Charleroi - Maubeuge - Paris - Orléans (EV6) - Tours (EV6) - Bordeaux - Saint-Jean-Pied-de-Port - Roncesvalles - Pamplona (EV1) - Logroño - Burgos - Frómista (EV1) - León - Ponferrada - Sarria - Santiago de Compostela	Norway, Sweden, Denmark, Germany, Belgium, France, Spain	5,650	3,510
EV4	Central Europe Route	Roscoff (EV1) - Mont-Saint-Michel - Cherbourg - Le Havre - Calais (EV5, EV12) - Vlissingen (EV12) - Venlo - Düsseldorf (EV3, EV15) - Bonn (EV3, EV15) - Frankfurt - Cheb (EV13) - Karlovy Vary - Prague (EV7) - Brno (EV9) - Kraków (EV11) - Lviv - Kyiv	France, Belgium, Netherlands, Germany, Czech Republic, Poland, Ukraine	5,100	3,200
EV5	Via Romea Francigena	Canterbury (EV12) - Dover (EV12) - Calais (EV4, EV12) - Lille - Brussels - Namur (EV3, EV19) - Luxembourg - Saarbrücken - Strasbourg (EV15) - Mulhouse (EV6) - Basel (EV6, EV15) - Andermatt (EV15, EV17) - Lucerne - Milan - Pavia (EV8) - Piacenza (EV8) - Lucca - Siena - Rome (EV7) - Benevento - Brindisi	United Kingdom, France, Belgium, Luxembourg, Germany, Switzerland, Italy	3,200	2,000
EV6	Atlantic – Black Sea Route	Saint-Brevin-les-Pins (EV1) - Nantes (EV1) - Tours (EV3) - Orléans - Besançon - Mulhouse (EV5) - Basel (EV5, EV15) - Radolfzell - Ulm - Regensburg - Passau (EV7) - Linz (EV7) - Vienna (EV9) - Bratislava (EV13) - Budapest - Osijek - Belgrade - Pančevo (EV11) - Bela Crkva (EV13) - Drobeta-Turnu Severin (EV13) - Vidin/Calafat - Ruse/Giurgiu - Silistra - Brăila - Constanța	France, Switzerland, Germany, Austria, Slovakia, Hungary, Croatia, Serbia, Romania, Bulgaria	4,450	2,770
EV7	Sun Route	North Cape (EV1, EV11) - Haparanda (EV10) - Sundsvall (EV10) - Gothenburg (EV3, EV12) - Helsingborg - Copenhagen (EV10) - Gedser - Rostock (EV10, EV13) - Berlin (EV2) - Dresden - Prague (EV4) - Linz (EV6) - Salzburg - Bolzano - Mantua (EV8) - Bologna - Florence - Rome (EV5) - Naples - Catanzaro - Catania - Valletta	Norway, Finland, Sweden, Denmark, Germany, Czech Republic, Austria, Italy, Malta	7,700	4,800
EV8	Mediterranean Route	Cádiz - Málaga - Almería - Murcia - Alicante - Valencia - Barcelona - Béziers - Sète (EV17) - Cannes - Nice - Turin - Pavia (EV5) - Mantua (EV7) - Venice - Trieste (EV9) - Koper - Pula (EV9) - Zadar - Split - Dubrovnik - Tivat - Kotor - Shkodër - Tirana - Vlorë - Patras - Athens (EV11) - Bergama - İzmir - Selçuk - Nicosia - Larnaca - Limassol - Paphos - Polis - Nicosia	Spain, France, Italy, Slovenia, Croatia, Montenegro, Albania, Greece, Turkey, Cyprus	7,500	4,700
EV9	Baltic - Adriatic	Gdańsk (EV10, EV13) - Bydgoszcz - Poznań (EV2) - Wrocław - Olomouc - Brno (EV4) - Břeclav - Vienna (EV6) - Maribor - Ljubljana - Trieste (EV8) - Pula (EV8)	Poland, Czech Republic, Austria, Slovenia, Italy, Croatia	2,050	1,270
EV10	Baltic Sea Cycle Route	Gdańsk (EV9, EV13) - Rostock (EV7, EV13) - Kiel - Sønderborg - Copenhagen (EV7) - Malmö - Kalmar - Stockholm - Sundsvall (EV7) - Umeå (EV7) - Oulu (EV11) - Vaasa - Turku - Helsinki (EV11) - Virolahti (EV13) - Saint Petersburg (EV13) - Tallinn (EV11, EV13) - Riga (EV13) - Klaipėda (EV13) - Kaliningrad (EV13) - Gdańsk	Poland, Germany, Denmark, Sweden, Finland, Russia, Estonia, Latvia, Lithuania	9,000	5,600
EV11	East Europe Route	North Cape (EV1, EV7) - Inari (EV13) - Rovaniemi - Oulu (EV10) - Kuopio - Helsinki (EV10) - Tallinn (EV10, EV13) - Tartu - Daugavpils - Vilnius - Warsaw (EV2) - Kraków (EV4) - Košice - Szeged (EV13) - Pančevo (EV6) - Skopje - Thessaloniki - Larissa - Athens (EV8)	Norway, Finland, Estonia, Latvia, Lithuania, Poland, Slovakia, Hungary, Serbia, North Macedonia, Greece	6,550	4,070
EV12	North Sea Cycle Route	Bergen (EV1) - Stavanger - Kristiansand - Gothenburg (EV3) - Halmstad - Grenaa - Esbjerg - Hamburg (EV3) - Bremerhaven - Den Helder - The Hague (EV2) - Vlissingen (EV4) - Dunkirk - Calais (EV4, EV5) - Dover (EV5) - Canterbury (EV5) - London (EV2) - Norwich - Hull - Newcastle - Edinburgh - Aberdeen (EV1) - Inverness (EV1) - Thurso - Orkney Islands - Shetland Islands - Bergen	Norway, Sweden, Denmark, Germany, Netherlands, Belgium, France, United Kingdom	7,050	4,380
EV13	Iron Curtain Trail	Grense Jakobselv - Kirkenes - Inari (EV11) - Sodankylä (EV11) - Suomussalmi - Lappeenranta - Saint Petersburg (EV10) - Tallinn (EV10, EV11) - Riga (EV10) - Klaipėda (EV10) - Kaliningrad (EV10) - Gdańsk (EV 9, EV10) - Greifswald (EV10) - Rostock (EV7, EV10) - Lübeck - Eschwege - Cheb (EV4) - Bratislava (EV6) - Donji Miholjac - Szeged (EV11) - Vršac - Drobeta-Turnu Severin (EV6) - Zaječar - Pirot - Kyustendil - Strumica - Petrich - Smolyan - Kyprinos - Edirne - Kırklareli - Malko Tarnovo - Rezovo	Norway, Finland, Russia, Estonia, Latvia, Lithuania, Poland, Germany, Czech Republic, Austria, Slovakia, Hungary, Slovenia, Croatia, Serbia, Romania, Bulgaria, North Macedonia, Greece, Turkey	9,950	6,180
EV14	Waters of Central Europe	Zell Am See - Bischofshofen (EV7) - Liezen - Graz - Fehring (EV9) - Gleisdorf - Szentgotthárd (EV13) - Keszthely - Székesfehérvár - Velence	Austria, Hungary	1,125	699
EV15	Rhine Cycle Route	Andermatt (EV5, EV17) - Chur - Grabs - Lustenau - Konstanz - Öhningen - Schaffhausen - Basel (EV5, EV6) - Rosenau/Weil am Rhein - Biesheim/Breisach - Strasbourg - Karlsruhe - Mannheim - Worms/Biebesheim am Rhein - Mainz (EV4) - Bingen (EV4) - Koblenz (EV4) - Bonn (EV3, EV4)) - Cologne (EV3, EV4) - Düsseldorf (EV3) - Duisburg (EV3) - Rheinberg/Wesel - Xanten/Emmerich am Rhein - Arnhem (EV2) - Leerdam - Rotterdam (EV19) - Hoek van Holland (E2, EV12, EV19)	Switzerland, Germany, France, Netherlands	1,500	930
EV17	Rhone Cycle Route	Andermatt (EV5, EV15) - Furka Pass - Brig - Sierre - Sitten - Martigny - Saint Gingolph/Vevey - Thonon-les-Bains/Lausanne - Geneva - Lyon - Valence - Avignon - Tarascon; East branch: Tarascon - Arles - Port-Saint-Louis-du-Rhône; West branch: Tarascon - Saint-Gilles - Palavas-les-Flots - Sète (EV8)	Switzerland, France	1,250	780
EV19	Meuse Cycle Route	Langres - Neufchâteau - Commercy - Verdun - Stenay - Charleville-Mézières - Dinant - Namur (EV3, EV5) - Liège - Maastricht - Venlo - Cuijk - Den Bosch - Dordrecht - Hoek van Holland (EV2, EV12, EV15) - Rotterdam (EV15)	France, Belgium, Netherlands	1,050	650

- Routes EV10 and EV12 are a circular tour
- Connections to other EV routes are in parentheses
- Odd routes are heading north–south, even routes are heading west–east

== Route information ==
=== EuroVelo 1 – Atlantic Coast Route ===
Stretching the length of the continent, from North Cape, Norway to Valença, Portugal, the EV1 connects Norway, Scotland, Northern Ireland, the Republic of Ireland, Wales, the West Country of England, France, Spain and Portugal.

=== EuroVelo 2 – Capitals Route ===
EV2 runs between Galway, Ireland to Moscow, Russia visiting some capital cities along the way, from Eyre Square to Red Square.

Between The Hague in the Netherlands and the German-Polish border, the EV2 follows the bicycle route called European Bicycle Route R1 or Euro-Route R1, an international long-distance cycling route connecting Boulogne-sur-Mer in France with St Petersburg in Russia.

=== EuroVelo 3 – Pilgrims Route ===
EV3 goes from Trondheim in Norway to Santiago de Compostela in Spain. The route follows traces of old roads used for pilgrimages in the Middle Ages. The route passes through Norway, Sweden, Denmark, Germany, Belgium, France and Spain. Most of these countries have a developed network of bicycle routes used as part of the EV3.

=== EuroVelo 4 – Central Europe Route ===
The EV4 goes from Roscoff, France to Kyiv, Ukraine, going through France, Belgium, the Netherlands, Germany, the Czech Republic, Poland, and Ukraine.

=== EuroVelo 5 – Via Romea Francigena ===
The EV5 route is inspired by the Via Francigena, a pilgrimage route from London to Rome first recorded by Archbishop of Canterbury Sigeric in the 10th century AD. However, the route of the true Via Francigena is an almost straight line path from London to Rome, while the EuroVelo 5 route takes a more easterly route that passes through Brussels, Luxembourg and Strasbourg in the Alsace. It then follows the Franco-German border, passes through Switzerland following Swiss National Bike Route no. 3, before crossing the Alps at the Gotthard Pass. It then passes through Italy (more closely following Sigeric's route) to Rome before continuing on to the Adriatic port city of Brindisi.

=== EuroVelo 6 – River Route ===
Running from Saint-Nazaire on the mouth of the river Loire along that river eastward through France, EV6 passes over the border to Switzerland to Lake Constance and then on to Tuttlingen in Germany, where it begins its way down the Danube following the Donauradweg (Danube Cycle Route). It follows that river, Europe's second longest, through Germany, Austria, Slovakia, Hungary, Serbia, Bulgaria and Romania to the river's mouth at the Danube Delta. It then continues southwards to end in Constanța, on the Black Sea.

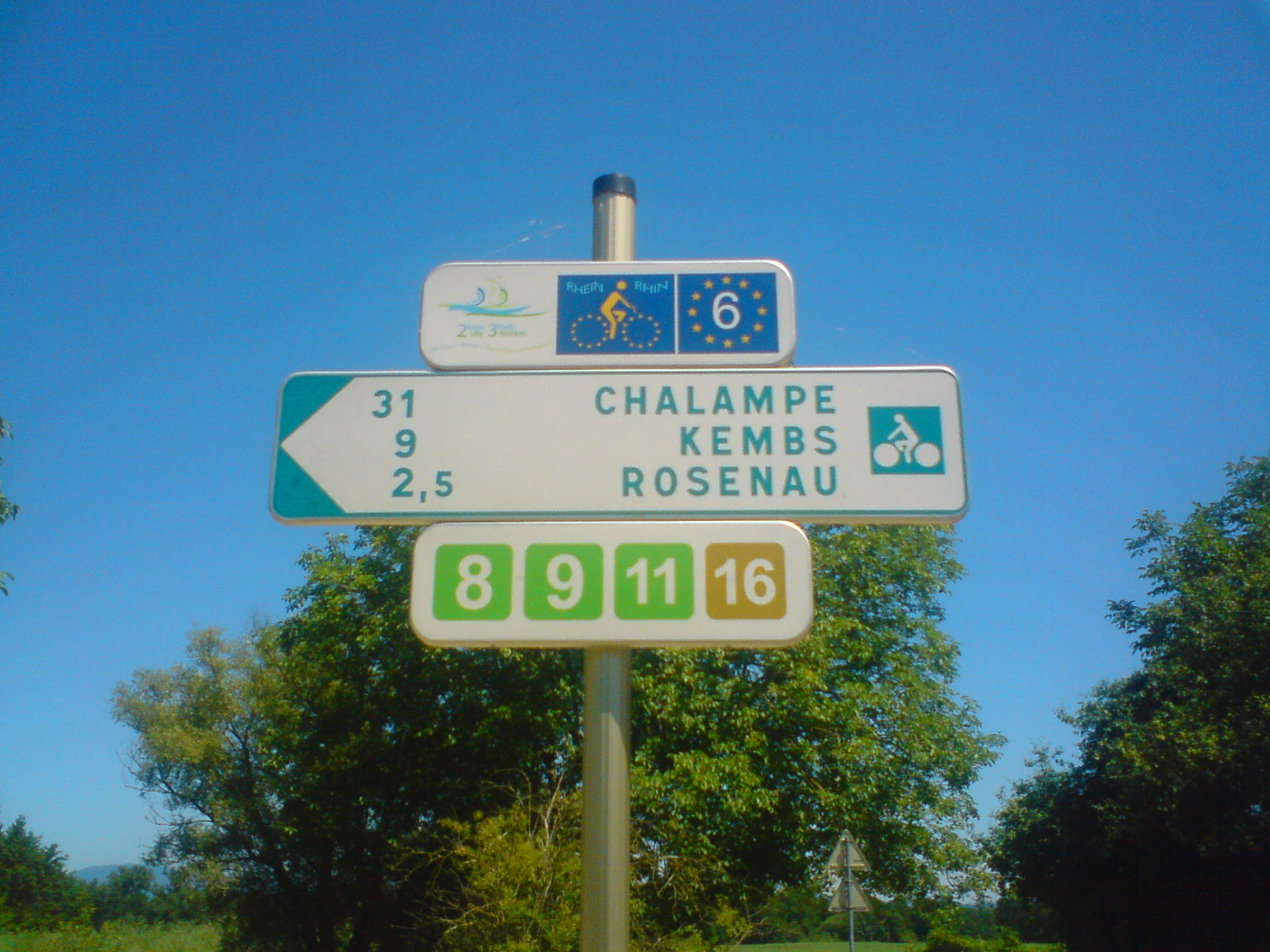
Signage for EuroVelo 6 in France near the tripoint of France, Switzerland and Germany

=== EuroVelo 7 – Sun Route ===
EV7 runs from the North Cape to Malta. It goes through Norway, Finland, Sweden, Denmark, Germany, the Czech Republic, Austria, Italy, and Malta.

=== EuroVelo 8 – Mediterranean Route ===
EV8 follows the European coastline of the Mediterranean sea from Cádiz, Spain to Athens, Greece, going through Spain, France, Italy, Slovenia, Croatia, Bosnia and Herzegovina, Montenegro, Albania, Greece, Turkey, and Cyprus.

=== EuroVelo 9 – Amber Route ===
EV9 (in Poland, also labeled as R9) stretches from the Baltic Sea to the Adriatic Sea. It is so named after the precious stone amber collected in the Baltic, which was taken by routes such as this to the Mediterranean. One of the shortest of the EuroVelo routes, EV9 still manages to cut across Europe from north to south, from Poland to Croatia, and in doing so passes through the Czech Republic, Austria and Slovenia en route.

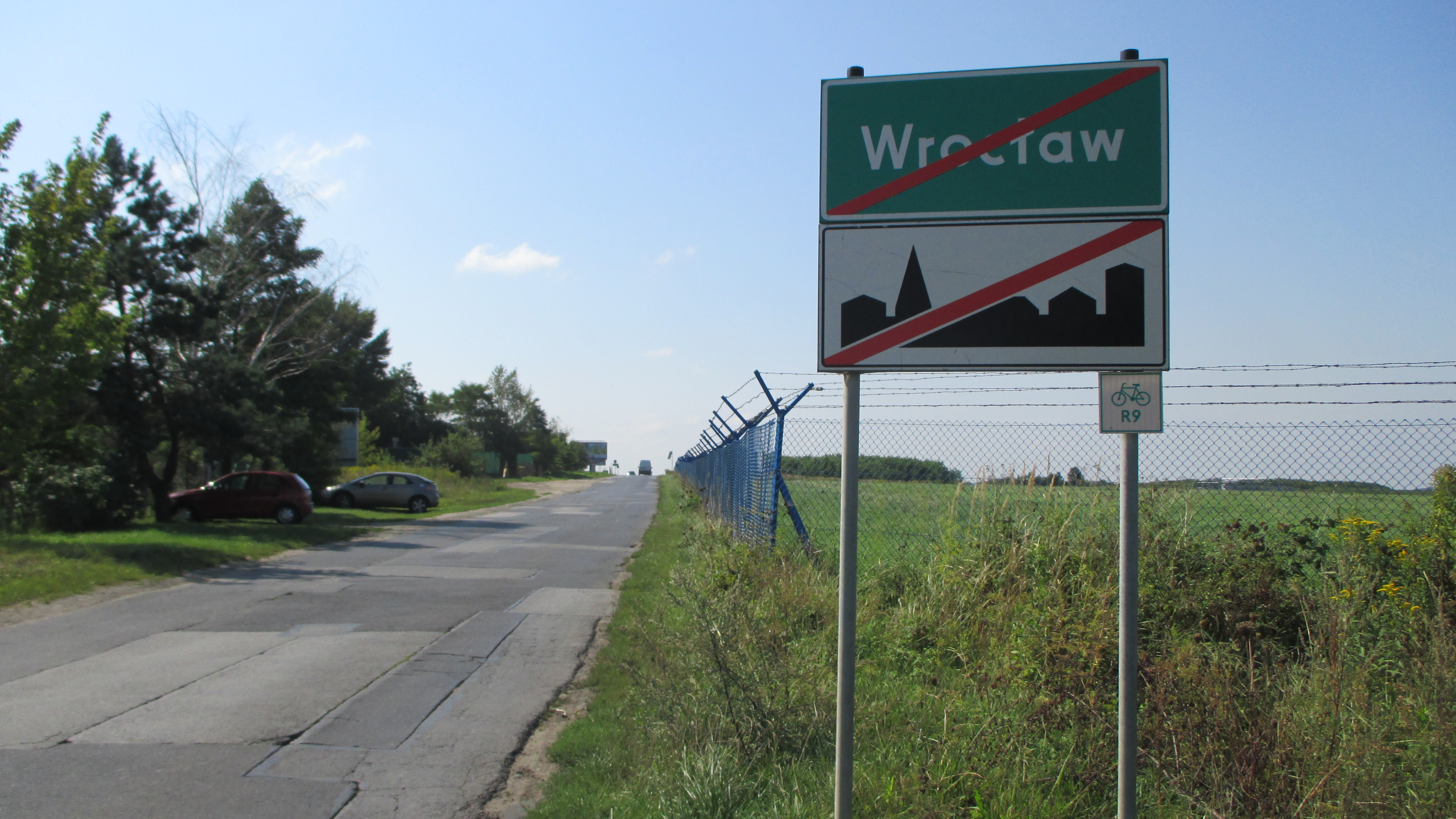
Sign R9 at the south-western border of Wrocław, near Wrocław Airport

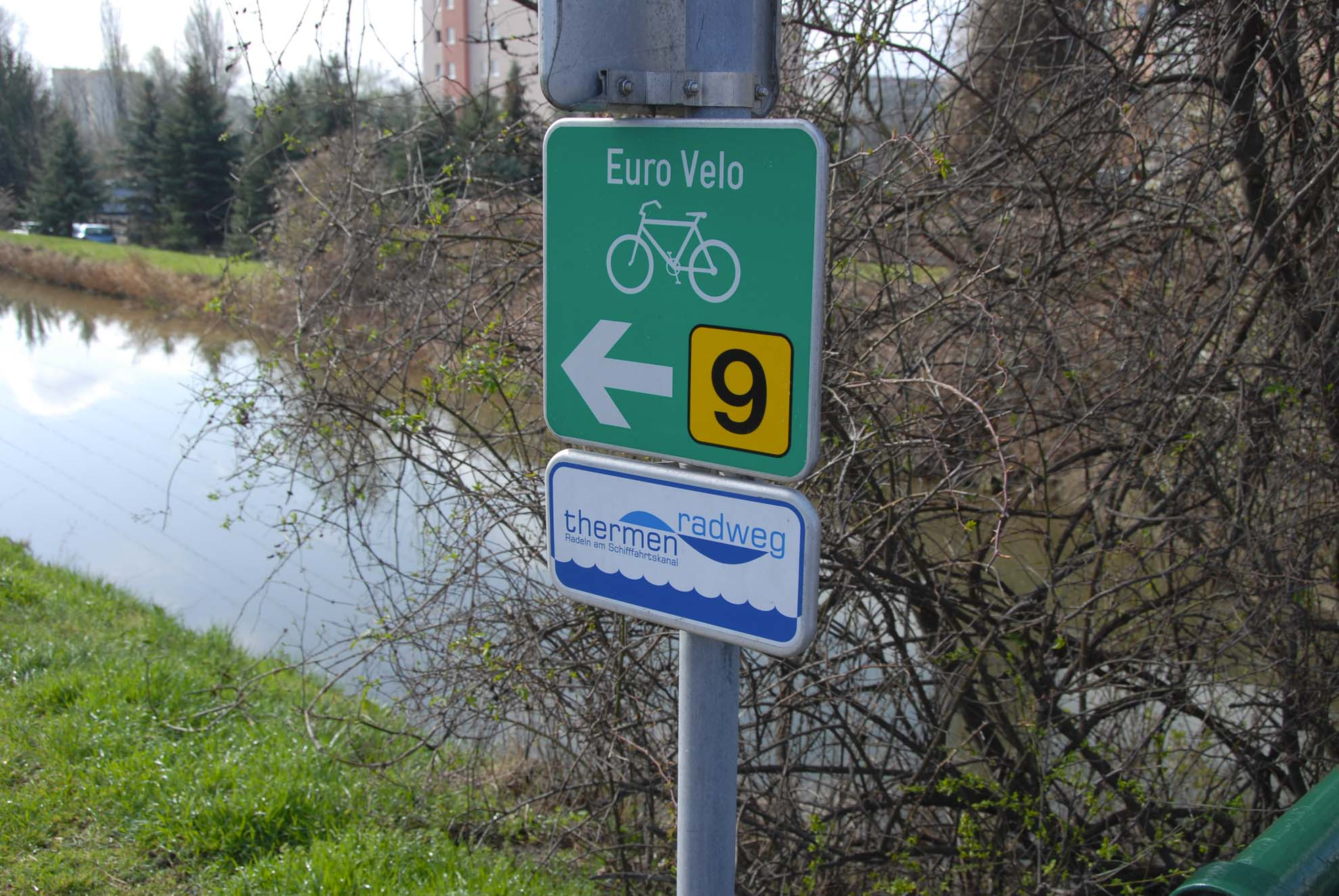
Signage for EuroVelo 9, Wiener Neustadt, Austria

=== EuroVelo 10 – Baltic Route ===
EV10 runs around Baltic Sea. Some of its parts are mapped on OpenStreetMap project Relation: EuroVelo 10 - Baltic Sea Cycle Route - part Sweden (63584). On the state of the route there is an OpenStreetMap wiki page

=== EuroVelo 11 – East Europe Route ===
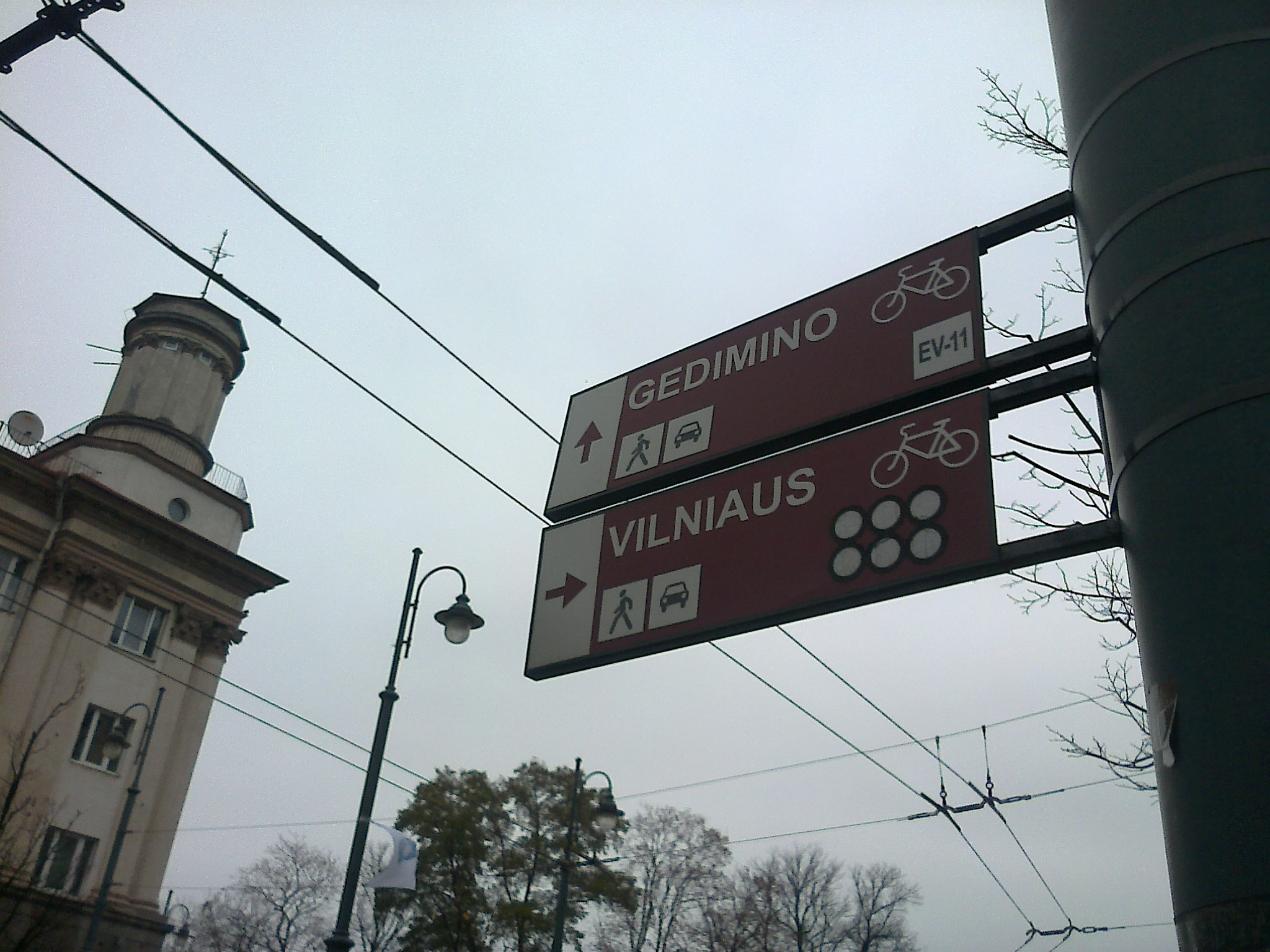
Signage for EuroVelo 11, Vilnius, Lithuania

EV11 connects (theoretically) Norway's North Cape with Athens.

=== EuroVelo 12 – North Sea Route ===
EV12 was the first European route, opened in June 2001, 6,000 km (3,700 mi) route through England, Scotland, Norway, Sweden, Denmark, Germany, the Netherlands and Belgium. It features in the Guinness Book of Records as the longest unbroken signposted cycling route. It was funded in part by the European Union's Interreg initiative.

=== EuroVelo 13 – Iron Curtain Trail ===
EV13 follows the old Iron Curtain, the divided borders of Europe during the Cold War. The ICT runs from Kirkenes, Norway on the Barents Sea, along the Finno-Russian border through to the Baltic Sea, then hugs the length of the Baltic coast to Lübeck in Germany. It then follows the old border between West Germany and the former East Germany, the current borders between the Czech Republic and both Germany then Austria, the Austrian-Slovak and Austrian-Hungarian borders before following the borders of Romania, the former Yugoslavia, Bulgaria and North Macedonia. It finishes at Rezovo in Bulgaria on the Black Sea after following the border with Greece and Turkey.

=== EuroVelo 15 – The Rhine Cycle Route ===
EV15, with an overall length of about 1,320 km (820 mi) passes through four countries from the headwaters of the Rhine in Andermatt in the Swiss Alps to the estuary in Rotterdam in the Netherlands, via France and Germany.

=== EuroVelo 17 – Rhone Cycle Route ===
EV17 has an overall length of about 1,250 km (780 mi). It starts in Andermatt and runs along each side of Lake Geneva before crossing into France. Passing through Lyon and Avignon, it forks into sections which end in Montpellier and Marseille.

=== EuroVelo 19 – Meuse Cycle Route ===
EV19, with an overall length of about 1,050 km (650 mi), is the newest and the shortest EuroVelo route. It follows one of the most significant rivers in Europe, from the source of the Meuse on the Langres plateau in France, heading north into Belgium and on to the river mouth at Hook of Holland, with the route ending in the Dutch port city of Rotterdam.

== Requirements ==
The ECF has written a route development manual for those working on developing EuroVelo routes. According to the guidelines, all EuroVelo routes should fulfill the following criteria:

- They must be based on existing or planned national or regional routes of the involved countries.
- At least two countries must be involved.
- Route length must be at least 1,000 km (620 mi).
- Steep sections should be avoided wherever possible and for very steep sections (if unavoidable) alternative transport options (i.e. public transport or alternative routes) should be provided.
- Easy to communicate - internationally recognisable identity and name (marketing potential).
- Implementation plans in place (project plan, business plan, partners).
- Signing in accordance with the regulations of the respective nations and/or regions, continuous and in both directions.
- Signage supplemented by EuroVelo route information panels, in accordance with the recommendations of UNECE and the ECF's Signing of EuroVelo cycle routes manual.

== Route infrastructure ==
In 2011 the share of route infrastructure components in the EuroVelo network was as follows:

- Bicycle path/lane: 14%
- Traffic-free asphalted road: 8%
- Traffic-free non-asphalted road: 6%
- Public low-traffic, asphalted road: 56%
- Public non-asphalted road: 3%
- Public high-traffic, asphalted road: 14%

== See also ==
- European long-distance paths
- Outline of cycling
- Route Verte
- United States Bicycle Route System
- Cyclability
- Cycling network
