= Long-distance cycling route =

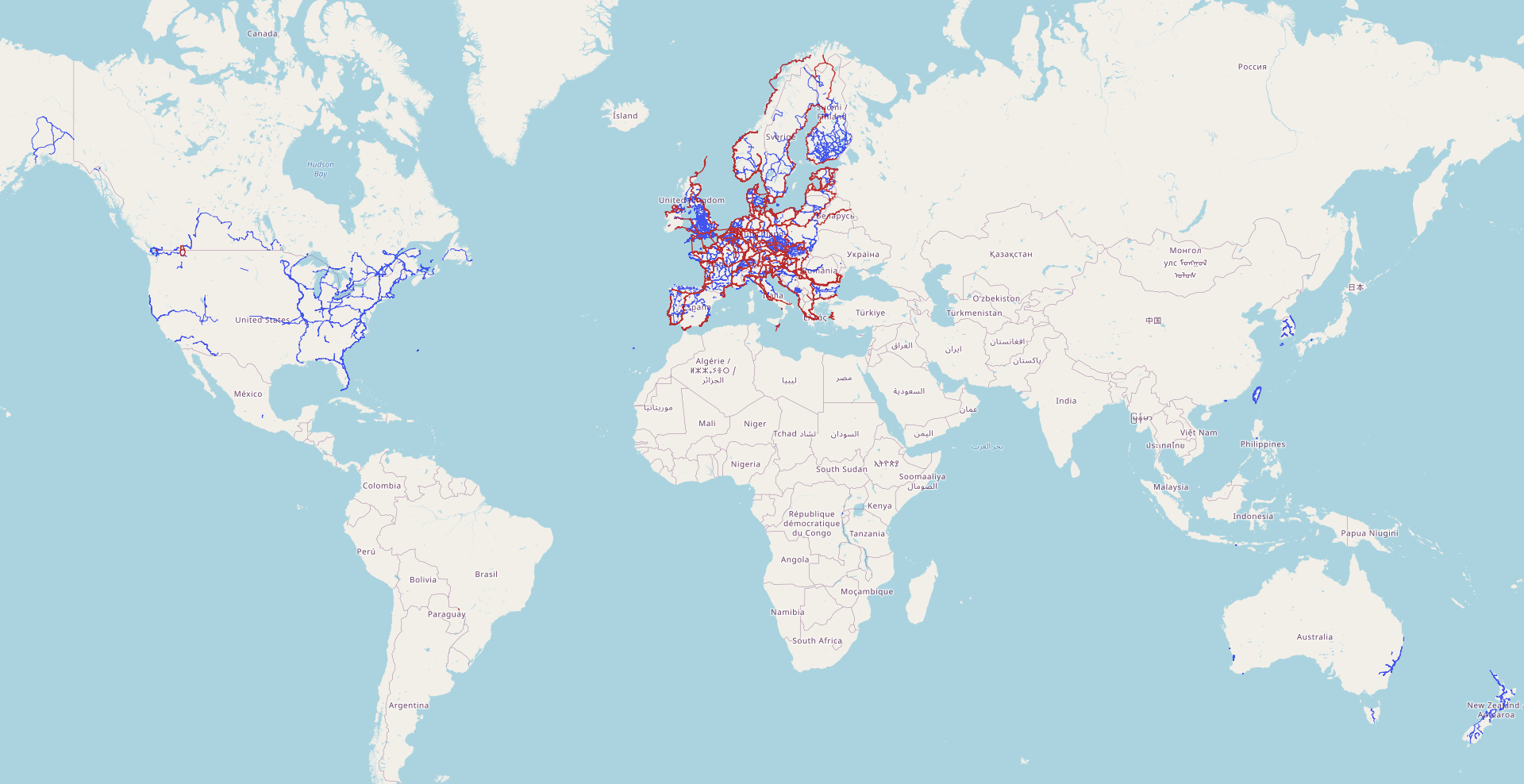
A subset of waymarked long-distance bicyle routes around the world from OpenStreetMap as of August 2021. The red lines indicate international bike routes.

Long-distance cycling routes are designated cycling routes in various countries around the world for bicycle tourism. These routes include anything from longer rail trails, to national cycling route networks like the Dutch and Flemish LF-routes, the French Veloroute or the routes of the British National Cycle Network, to the multi-state routes of the United States Bicycle Route System, to the multi-country routes of the EuroVelo network in Europe, the longest of which is over 6,800 km (4,200 mi) in length.

== List of countries ==
- Europe
  - EuroVelo
  - LF-routes of the Netherlands and Belgium
  - National Cycle Network of Britain
  - Swiss National Bike Routes
  - D-Routes of Germany
  - Cyklistické trasy in Slovakia & the Czech Republic^{[sk][cz]}
- United States
  - United States Bicycle Route System
  - East Coast Greenway
- Australia
  - Munda Biddi Trail, the longest continuous off-road cycle trail of its kind in the world
  - Bicentennial National Trail
- New Zealand
  - The Timber Trail, linear 85-kilometre (53 mi) trail crossing suspension bridges on the North Island, near Lake Taupo.
- Long-distance trail, the equivalent for hikers and other walkers
