= Locator =

Locator may refer to:

- One who locates, or is entitled to locate, a land or mining claim
- Lokator (in Latin locator), a medieval servant in charge of organizing colonization and settlement
- Locator map
- Locator software, a type of e-commerce software
- Locator (computing), a tool used in software development
- Maidenhead Locator System, a method used by amateur radio operators to define locations on the Earth
- Record locators used by airlines and travel agencies
- Uniform Resource Locator (URL)
- A device used in acoustic location
- The Locator, a series of novels by Richard Greener which were adapted into the television series The Finder
- (Laboratory) A person in charge of knowing where all the staff of a laboratory are located, using signals from a badge that the staff wear.

== Aviation ==
- Non-directional beacon, a radio navigation aid for use by pilots of aircraft
- Locator outer marker, a radio navigation aid for use with an aircraft instrument landing system

== See also ==
- Locate (disambiguation)
- Location (disambiguation)
