= Location problem =

Location problem may refer to several categories of problems within various application areas associated with different meanings of the terms "location" and "locate".

- A problem to find the actual location of an object:
  - Artillery location problem
- A problem to find an optimal location for an object:
  - Facility location problem
  - Point location problem
  - Cutter location problem
