= Allocation =

Allocation may refer to:

== Computing ==
- Block allocation map
- C++ allocators
- Delayed allocation
- File allocation table
- IP address allocation
- Memory allocation
- No-write allocation (cache)
- Register allocation

== Economics ==
- Asset allocation
- Economic system
- Market allocation scheme
- Resource allocation
- Tax allocation district

== Telecommunication ==
- Call-sign allocation plan
- Frequency allocation
- Type allocation code

== Other ==
- Allocution (law), or allocutus, is a formal statement made to the court
- Allocation (oil and gas) in hydrocarbon accounting to assign the proper portions of aggregated petroleum and gas flows back to contributing sources
- Allocation voting in voting
- Location-allocation, used in geographic information systems (GIS)
- The allocation of scarce resources in operations research

== See also ==
- Location (disambiguation)
