= Ruslan Balbek =

Russian politician (born 1977)

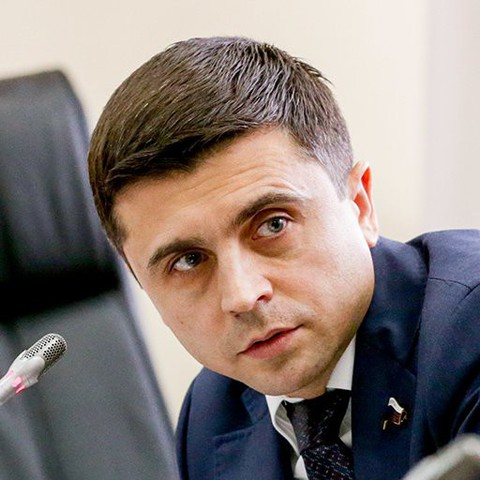

Deputy of the State Duma
- In office 5 October 2016 – 12 October 2021
- Constituency: Republic of Crimea

Deputy Chairman of the Council of Ministers of the Republic of Crimea
- In office 28 May 2014 – 30 September 2016
- President: Vladimir Putin
- Prime Minister: Sergey Aksyonov
- Preceded by: Lenur Islyamov (acting)
- Succeeded by: position abolished

Personal details
- Born: 28 August 1977 (age 49) Bekabad, Uzbek SSR, USSR
- Citizenship: Russian Federation
- Party: United Russia (2014-2025)
- Education: Tavrida National V.I. Vernadsky University; National Academy of Public Administration under the President of Ukraine; Tauride Institute of Entrepreneurship and Law; Presidential Russian Academy of National Economy and Public Administration
- Website: русланбальбек.рф

Ruslan Ismailovich Balbek (Russian: Руслан Исмаилович Бальбек; born 28 August 1977) is a Russian politician, economist. Candidate of political sciences (2019).

Deputy of the State Duma of the Federal Assembly of the Russian Federation of the VII convocation, deputy chairman of the State Duma committee on nationalities (October 5, 2016 — October 12, 2021). Deputy chairman of the Council of Ministers of the Republic of Crimea (from 28 May 2014 to 30 September 2016). Assistant to the deputy of the Verkhovna Rada of Ukraine (2010-2013).

Member of the All-Russian political party United Russia from 2014 to 2025 year.

On September 2025, he was arrested in the Kabardino-Balkarian Republic by russian law enforcement agencies in connection with the initiation of a criminal case against him. He is accused of three crimes under the Criminal Code of the Russian Federation: libel, unauthorized access to computer information, and violation of privacy.

== Biography ==
Ruslan Ismailovich Balbek was born on August 28, 1977 in the city of Bekabade of the Tashkent region of the Uzbek SSR (now Republic of Uzbekistan).

In 1994, he graduated with honors from Grushevskaya Secondary School in Sudak, in 2000 from the Tauride Institute of Entrepreneurship and Law in Simferopol with a degree in economics, in 2001 from the Vernadsky Tauride National University (now the Tauride Academy of the V.I. Vernadsky Crimean Federal University) with a degree in economics.the manager." He studied at the National Academy of Public Administration under the President of Ukraine with a degree in Public Policy and Management.

In 2014 He continued his studies at the Presidential Russian Academy of National Economy and Public Administration, specializing in Public Administration Security and Anti-Corruption.

In 2001-2003, he was the director of the travel company «TEZ TOUR».

In 2007-2012, he was a delegate to the Kurultai of the Crimean Tatar People of the Autonomous Republic of Crimea.

In 2010, Ruslan Balbek ran for a seat in the Sudak City Council as a member of the Socialist Party of Ukraine. However, he was not elected, as the party did not gain a majority in the local parliament.

In 2010-2013 – he was an assistant to the deputy of the Verkhovna Rada of Ukraine.

In 2012-2013, he was Chairman of the Committee on Interethnic Relations of the Public Council under the Council of Ministers of the Autonomous Republic of Crimea.

In 2013-2014, he was an adviser head to the Republican Committee Autonomous Republic of Crimea.

From May 28, 2014 to September 30, 2016 – Deputy head of the Council of Ministers of the Republic of Crimea.

In the Council of Ministers of the Republic of Crimea, he headed the Commission for the Restoration of the Rights of Rehabilitated Victims of Political Repression, and was a member of the Presidential Commission for the Rehabilitation of victims of political repression.

From October 5, 2016 to October 12, 2021 – Deputy of the State Duma of the Federal Assembly of the Russian Federation of the VII convocation from the Republic of Crimea.

In 2019, he became a Candidate of Political Sciences.

From April 2014 to August 2025, he was a member of the United Russia Party, a member of the political council of the Crimean regional branch of the United Russia Party.

== Criminal prosecution ==
On August 14, 2025, the Russian police announced the search for Ruslan Balbek.

In September 2025, Russian police detained Balbek in the Kabardino-Balkarian Republic after initiating a criminal case against him.

In March 2026, the Fourth Cassation Court of General Jurisdiction rejected the appeal of the lawyers of former State Duma deputy Ruslan Balbek and other defendants regarding the transfer of the criminal case to another region. It was decided to consider the case in Simferopol.

On April 17, 2026, the Kievsky district court of Simferopol began hearing the case of Ruslan Balbek, a former deputy of the State Duma of the Russia, who is accused of unauthorized access to information, violation of privacy, and defamation.

In May 2026, the Kievsky District Court in Simferopol extended the detention of Ruslan Balbek, a former State Duma deputy and former deputy prime minister of the Crimean government, by two months, until July 25.

In June 2026, the Supreme Court of the Republic of Crimea removed the case of former State Duma deputy Ruslan Balbek from the appellate review and sent it to the Fourth Cassation Court in Krasnodar. Earlier, Balbek's defense requested that his case be referred to the Supreme Court of the Russian Federation. After receiving the materials, the Court of Cassation must set a date for considering the jurisdiction of Balbec's case.

== Awards ==
- Commendation of the President of the Russian Federation (August 28, 2018, Moscow) — «For active participation in the socio-political life of Russian society».
- Certificate of Honor from the Plenipotentiary Representative of the President of the Russian Federation in the Crimean Federal District (March 16, 2015, Simferopol, Crimea) – «For the achievements and high professionalism».
- Letter of thanks from the Plenipotentiary Representative of the President of the Russian Federation in the Crimean Federal District (2016, Simferopol, Crimea) — «For impeccable and effective public service, great personal contribution to the development and establishment of the Crimean Federal District».
- Medal «For the Defense of the Republic of Crimea» (2015, Republic of Crimea) — «For courage and high patriotism in defending the rights and freedoms of the inhabitants of Crimea.
