= Numbered-node cycle network =

European bicycle path intersection numbering system

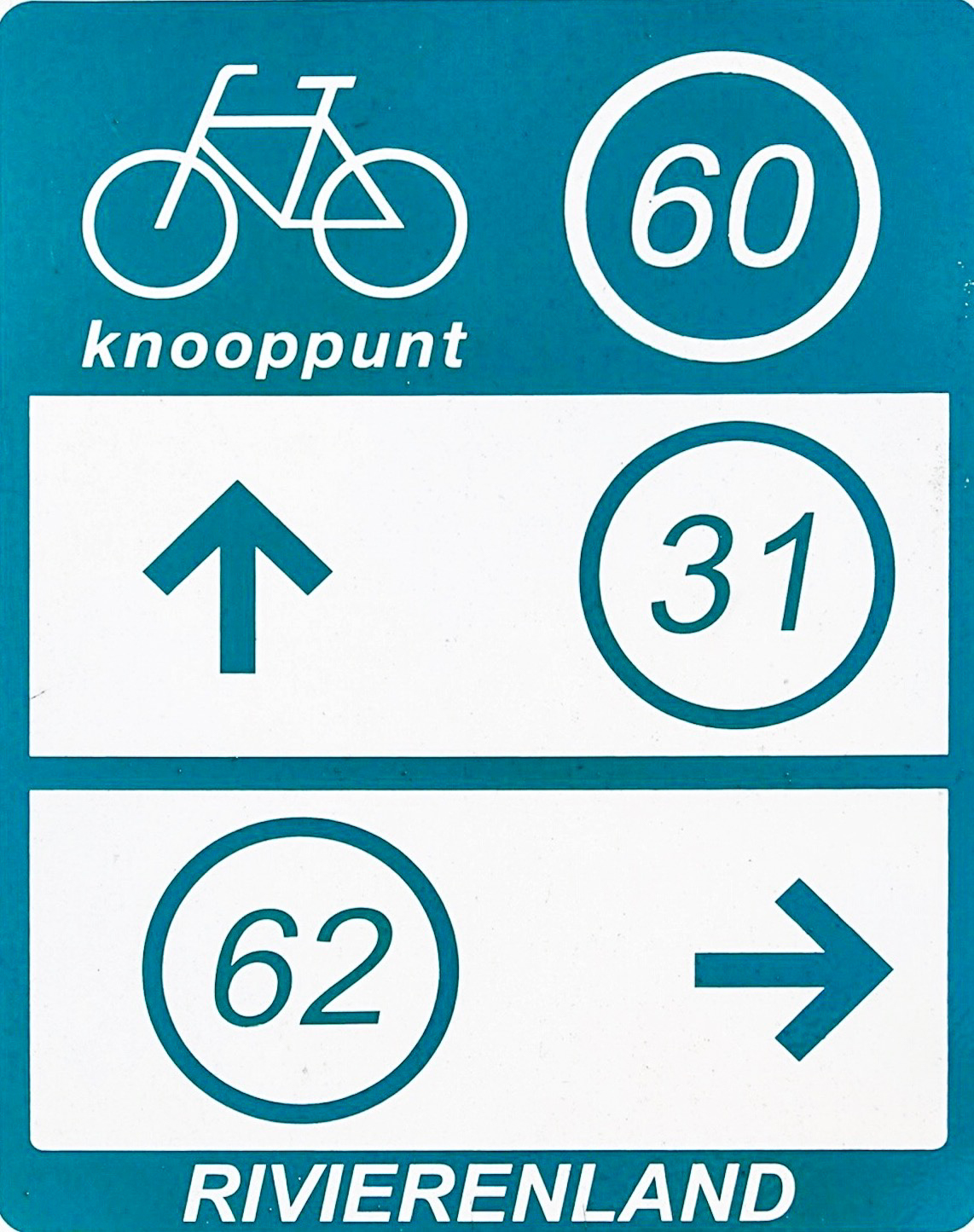
A numbered-node cycle network sign in the Netherlands. It marks node ("knooppunt") 60 situated in the Rivierenland region and points the way to nodes 31 and 62.

The numbered-node cycle network (Dutch: fietsknooppuntennetwerk; German: Knotenpunktbezogene Wegweisung/Knotenpunktsystem für Radwanderern [formal] and Radeln nach Zahlen ["bike-by-numbers", informal]) is a wayfinding system for cyclists in Europe. It works by assigning each junction or intersection (here called a node) on a bicycle-friendly cycling route a number: these numbers are then signposted at junctions along such routes so that the cyclist always knows which way to go to get to the next junction / node on their itinerary. As of 2026, the numbered-node cycle network is expanding rapidly with extensive coverage across the Netherlands and Flanders in Belgium, good coverage across Wallonia in Belgium, as well as parts of France, Germany, Denmark and Croatia.

Node numbers are not necessarily unique but those that do have same number will be situated so far apart that they cannot be confused. To design a route, the cyclist simply creates a list of node numbers, which will be the sequence of junctions or intersections that they will be passing through. The list of node numbers can be generated with a website. The cyclist can then see these nodes on a downloaded map or write them or circle them himself on a paper map.

Cycling networks are, by nature, more distributed than car routes, with more junctions; they do not gather all cyclists onto arterial bike routes. The numbered-node cycle network makes long-distance bike travel simpler (by making it harder to get lost), and faster (by making frequent stops to check a map needless). Additionally, another of the main benefits of using node numbers rather than named cycling routes, is that node numbers do not need translation. Areas on the numbered-node cycle network cite substantial economic benefits, including revenues from increased bike tourism.

The numbered-node network is more flexible than previous signage systems, which only indicated long, pre-determined routes. Numbered-node cycle network signage can be used to plan and follow any arbitrary route through the network: this makes for more flexible bicycle touring, and is more usable for utility cycling.

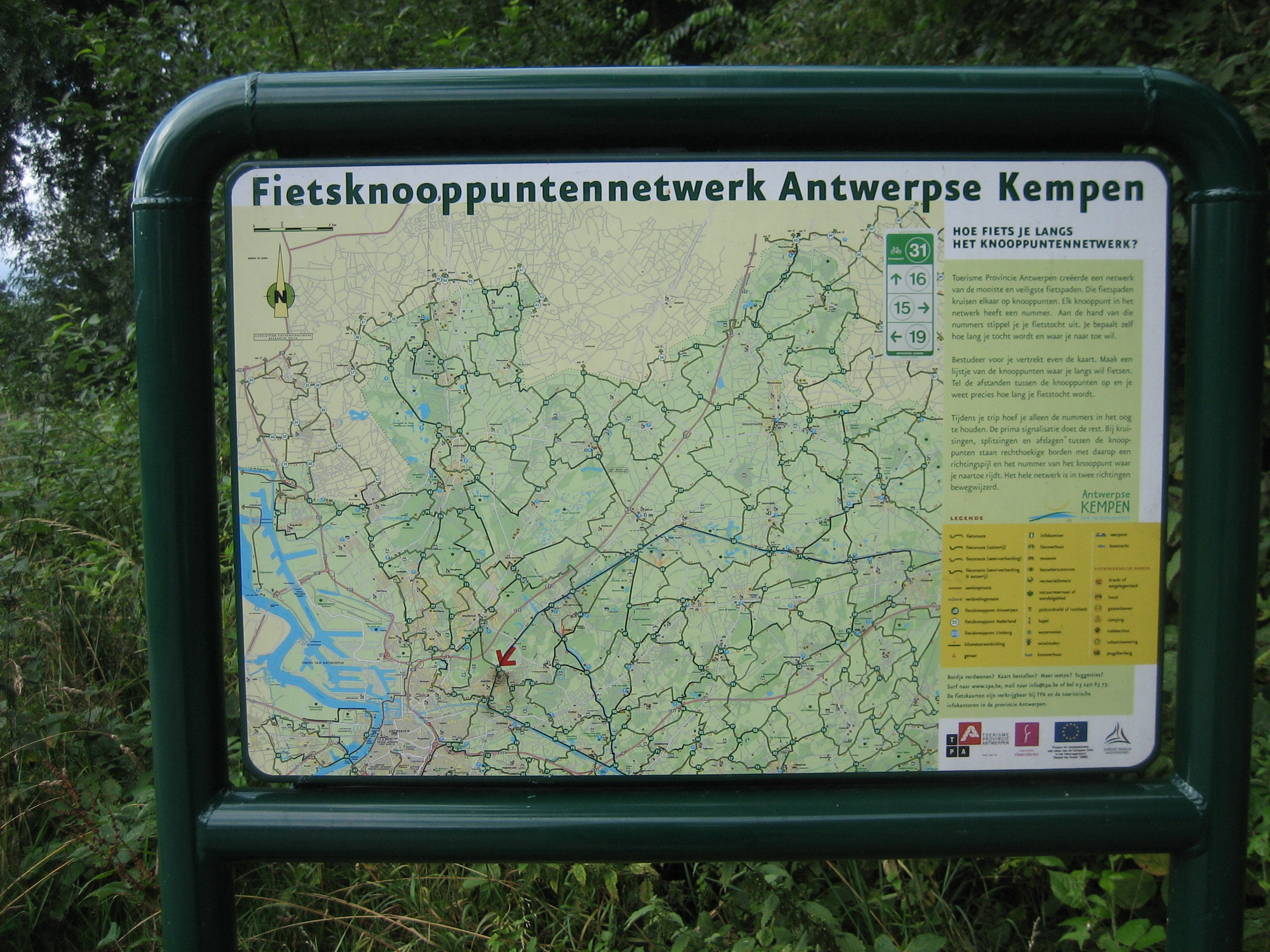
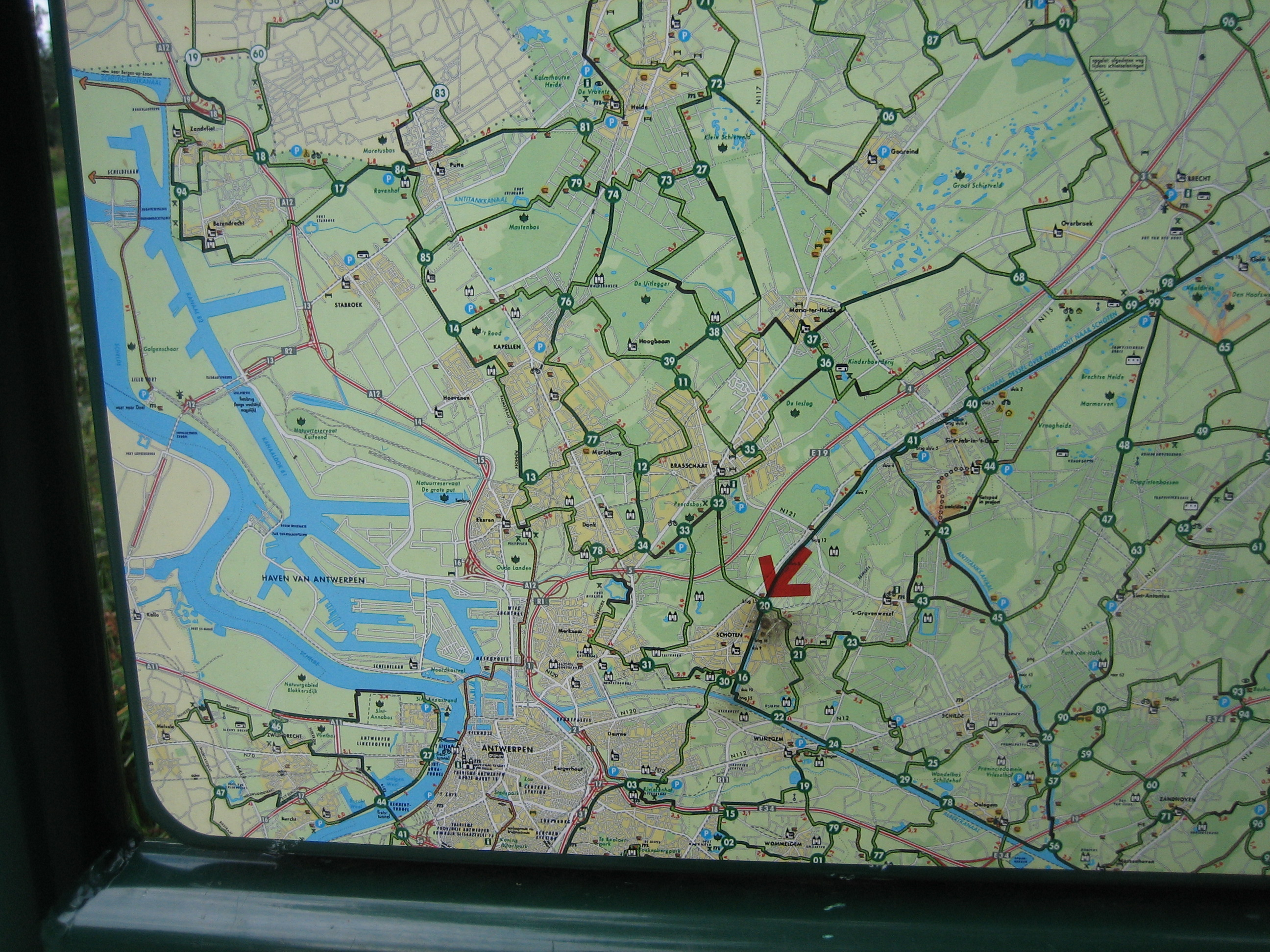
A locator map at node 20 in Schoten, near Antwerp. Each intersection is marked with a numbered circle. Each internode/interjunction distance is marked in kilometers, in red.

== History ==
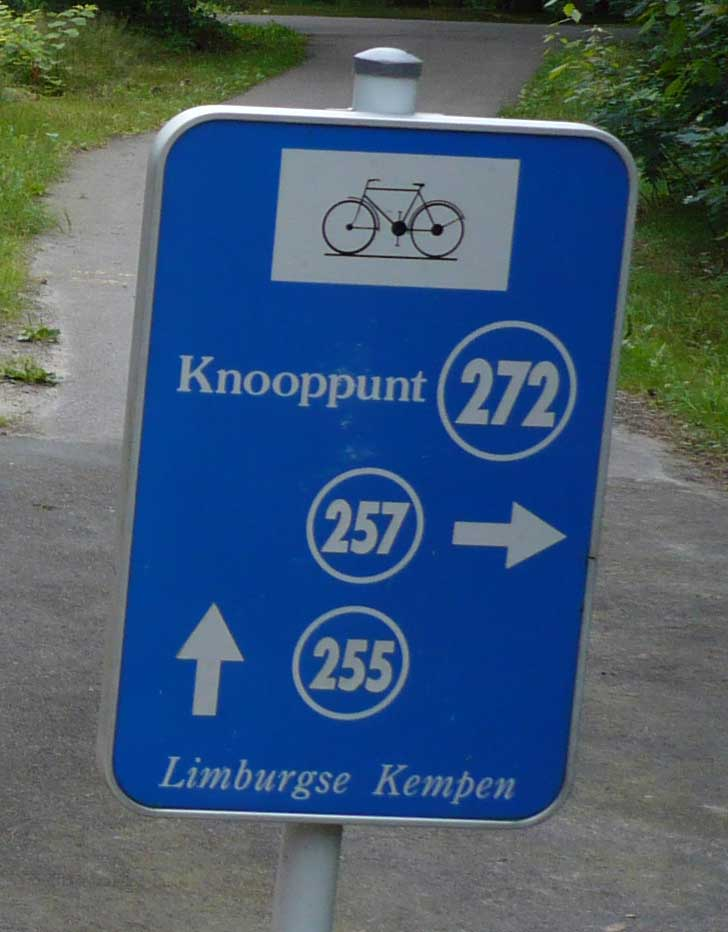
A sign at node 272 gives directions to nodes 257 and 255. Limburg (Belgium)

The system was designed by the Belgian Hugo Bollen. Bollen worked as a mine engineer from 1971 to 1990, and then joined Regionaal Landschap Kempen en Maasland (RLKM). RLKM did not ask Bollen to design the scheme; he volunteered it. The idea of labelling each intersection was inspired by his annoyance at having to stop at each intersection to read the map, when out biking with his wife; he personally describes himself as more of a hiker than a biker. Rumours notwithstanding, the numbering was not inspired by a wayfinding system from the mines, nor by the London Underground. Bollen said in a 2017 interview that the choice was straight logic: he needed to label each intersection, and using town names would have caused chaos, and there were not enough letters in the alphabet, so he used numbers. He wanted something short; he felt it was important that the signage not contain too much information.

Initially Tourism Limburg did not have much faith in the scheme, saying that Limburgers did not want to bike by numbers, but they came to support it. The first signage was installed in 1995, and the network has grown rapidly since. RLKM estimates that the network brings 16.5 million euros of revenue to Kempen (Campine) in Maarsland annually. Bollen has said he was surprised by the system's success.

The Flemish Prize for Merit in Sports was awarded to the system in 2009. The system won the Paul Mijksenaar Award for functional design in 2013.

=== Areas ===
The system was first introduced in the Netherlands in 1999, and by 2014, the entire Netherlands was part to the network. It was first introduced to Germany in 2001, and is being extended in multiple regions, including near the borders, in the Ruhrgebiet, Lower Rhine region, Sauerland and Siegerland (as of March 2021).

The system is displacing more traditional national cycling route network signage: long, named routes, each individually signposted. In 2017–2021, the Netherlands reduced its LF-routes, amalgamating some of them. The ways themselves remained part of the numbered-node network. Belgium also reduced its named routes in 2012.

== Use ==
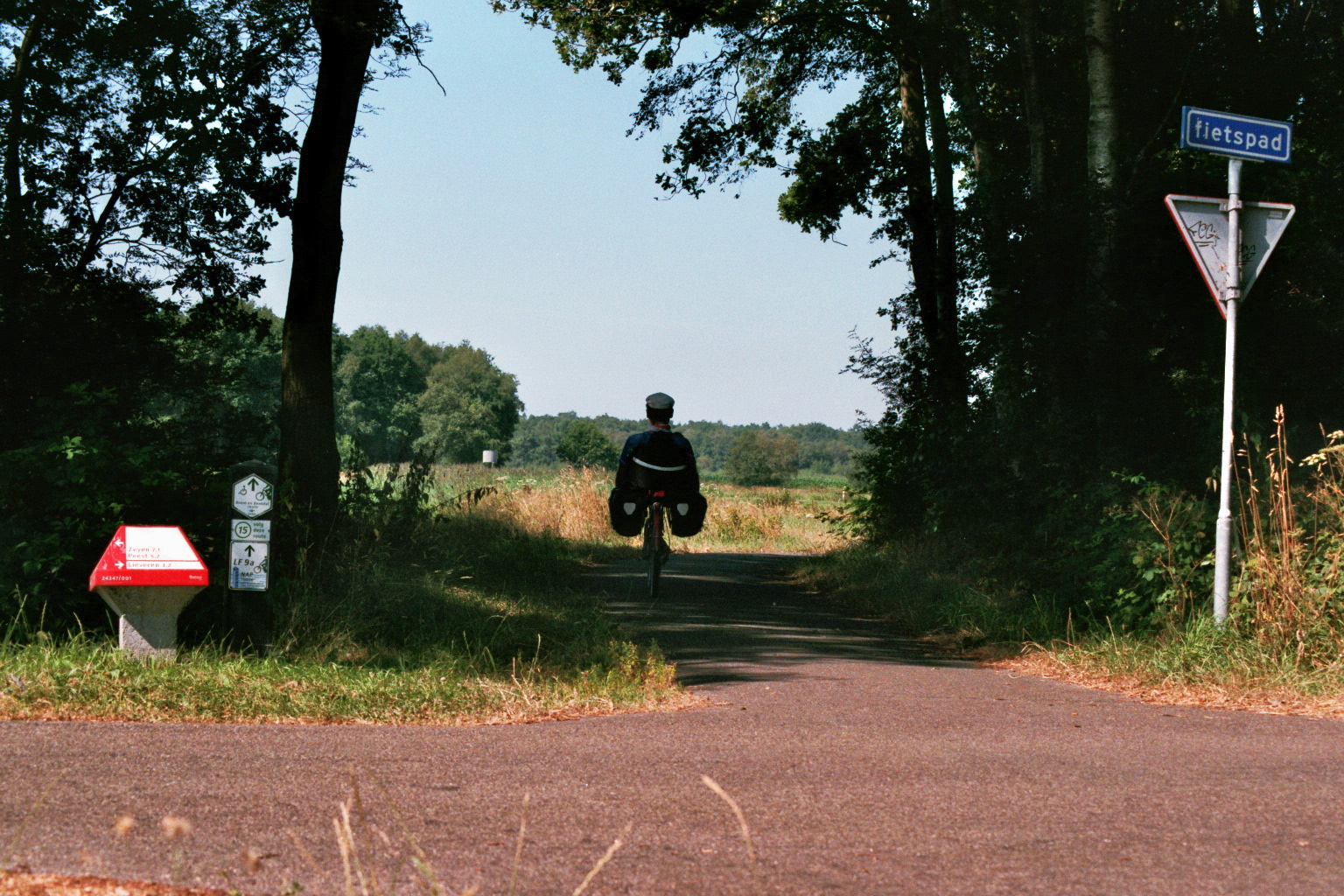
A recumbent bicycle passes a numbered-node-network sign and a padstool sign (kept low for ergonomics and scenic unobtrusiveness).

Paper maps for the numbered-node cycle network can be purchased at tourist offices, some hotels and restaurants, or purchased online. There are also many online route planners. OpenStreetMap, a Wikipedia-style map, has extensive information on the numbered-node network, available as downloadable maps and datasets under the Open Database License.

Cyclists sometimes print the lists of node numbers and fasten them to their handlebars or front mudguard. They can thus refer to them and pick the right path without having to memorize numbers or stop.

Paper, downloaded or roadside maps simplify changing route when plans, weather, etc. change.

As with rest areas alongside car routes, bike numbered-node networks are designed and upgraded for access to roadside services, such as public toilets, accommodation, food and drink. This encourages tourism and is seen as a form of local economic development. These facilities are also mapped in some areas.

The routes are not entirely on dedicated cycleways; some parts are on quiet roads. The routes are selected for being pleasant to cycle, and thus may not always be the shortest and fastest routes. While there is no formal international standard which routes must meet, routes are tested before they are added to the network, and there's an expectation that they will be more-or-less to Dutch standards for cycle routes. Points with a lot of cycle accidents may be removed from the network.

Some points have official signpost stickers giving instructions for submitting comments or finding out more about the location. Some jurisdictions also advertise themed routes, or routes that parallel train routes, publishing a series of numbers that specify them.

== Road signs ==
=== Numbering ===
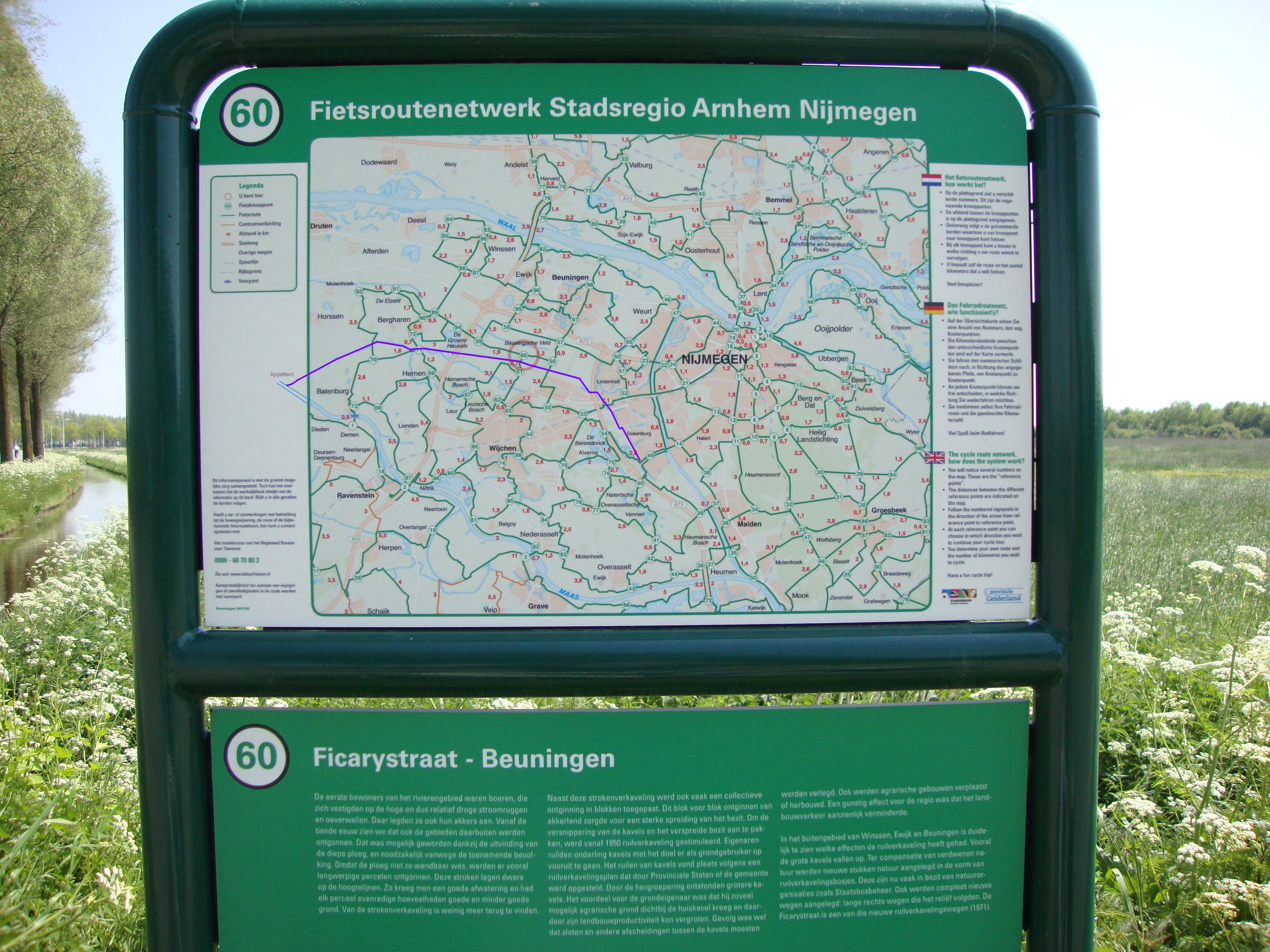
The Dutch network includes cities; here the Arnhem–Nijmegen metropolitan area is shown at node 60, in Beuningsche Veld.

In the Netherlands, one- and two-digit numbers are used. Nodes with the same number are placed far apart. Signs also name the network section and say which local authority maintains the network.

Belgium uses two- and three-digit numbers, and they are assigned by the local maintaining organization instead of a central network organization. It is thus very rarely the case that two nearby nodes will have the same number.

In Germany, there is a one- to two-digit system; as in the Netherlands, it is organized at the national level (by the FGSV), but signs are usually implemented by local tourist boards.

=== Sign types ===
Road signs vary depending on jurisdiction. At nodes, node signs give the direction of the adjacent nodes, and between nodes, the internode signs show cyclists heading for the next node which direction to go, reassuring them that they are on the right track (see images). Signs are bidirectional. Signage also includes maps at a variety of scales. Internode distances are given.

The Netherlands and Belgium have signs set at or below cyclist eye-level, with minimal, large, text (readable without slowing down). There is a principle in the Netherlands that cyclists should not be slowed or stopped; a constant speed is more comfortable and efficient, and makes for shorter travel times.

In Germany, standard signage is set high on poles. German nodes are usually marked by a large red "Node-point-hat" ("Knotenpunkthut") sign on top of the pole, visible from a distance; just below, the directions of adjacent nodes are indicated in the wordier format of traditional pedestrian arrow signage (see images below). German node signage is usually white-on-red. Most nodes in Germany have wayside-map signs at eye level. The system has been described as ideal for those with no sense of direction.

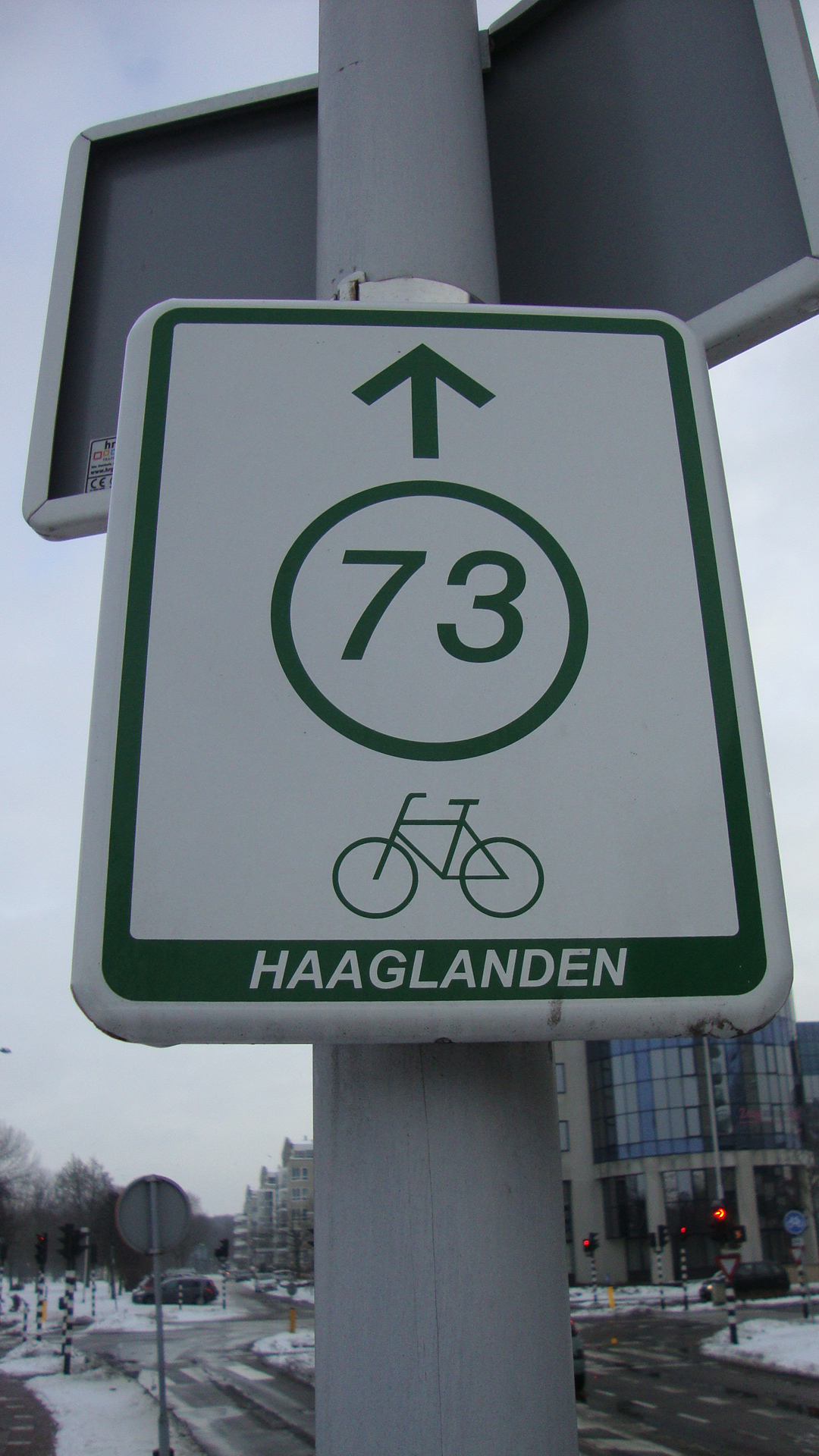
An internode sign. Haaglanden, the Netherlands

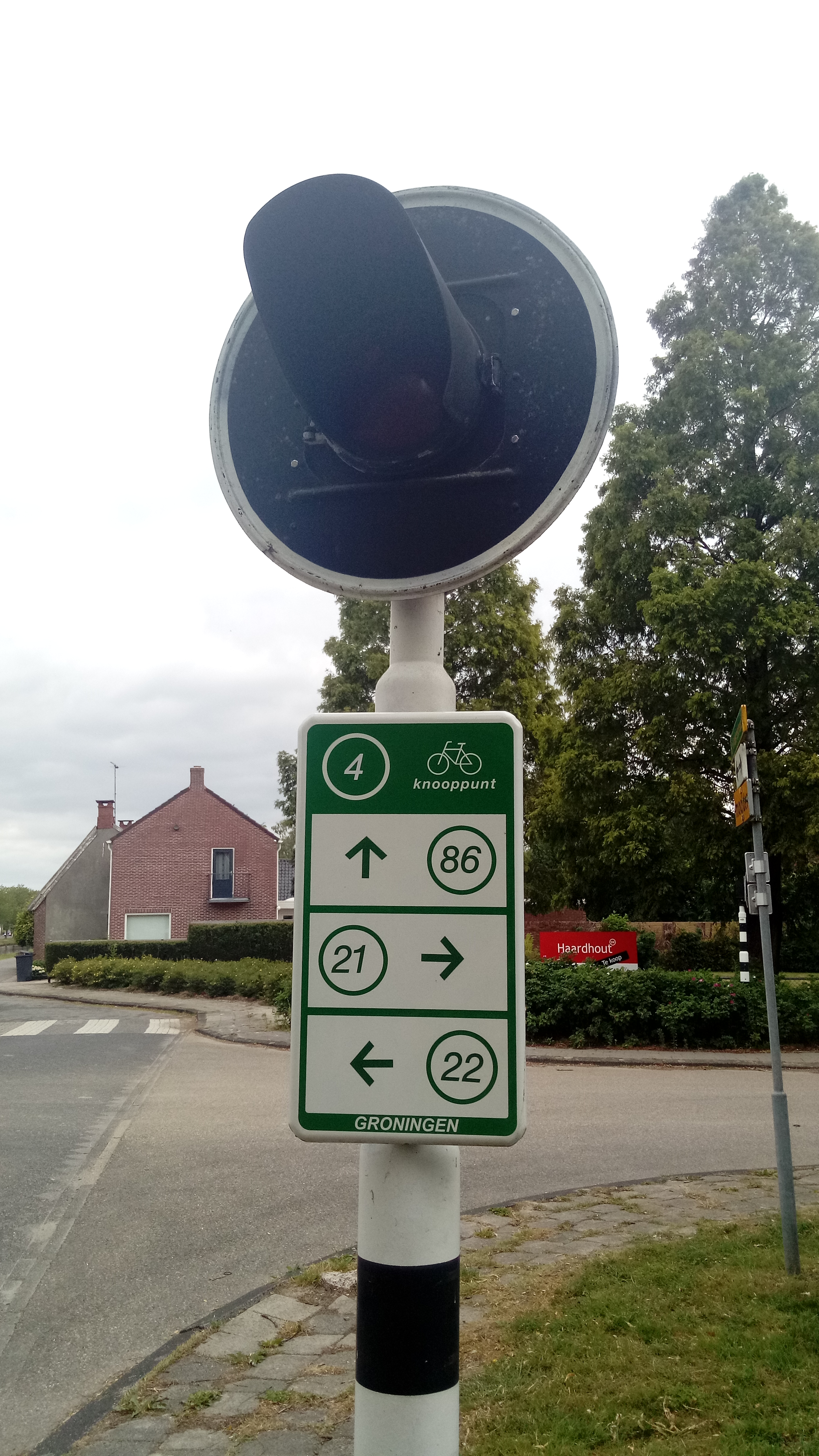
A node sign at node four, with the directions to three other nodes. Oude Pekela, the Netherlands

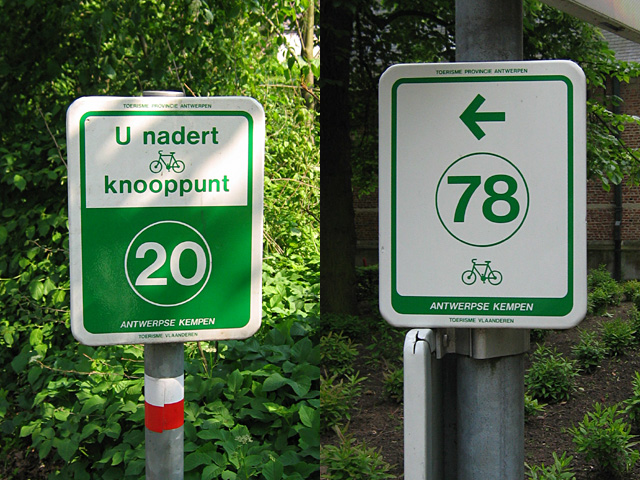
A sign saying "You are approaching node 20" (left) and an internode sign (right) in the Antwerpish Campine, Belgium. See the locator map at this node above.

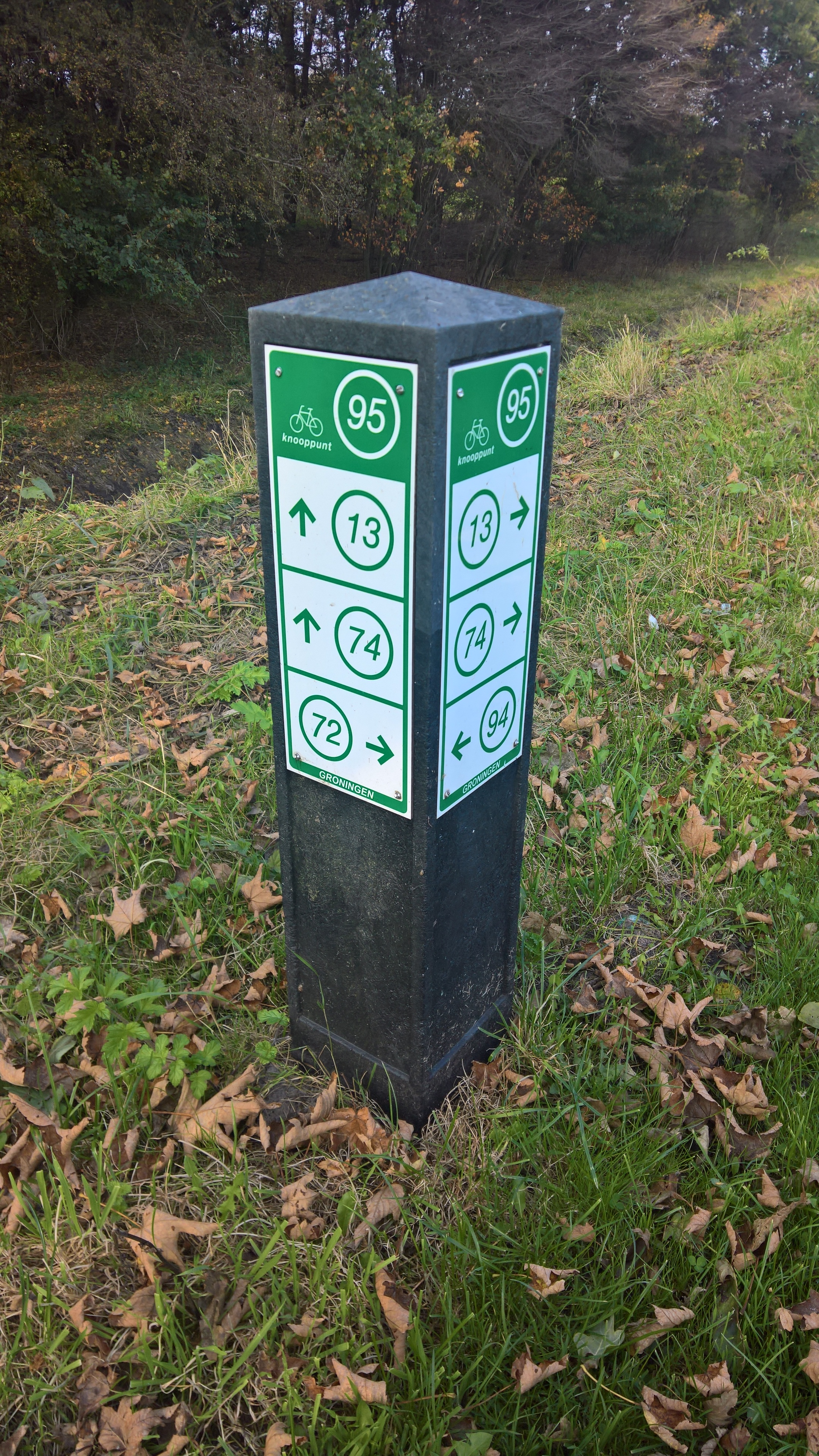
A node sign at node 95 gives the direction of nodes 72, 74, 13, and 94. Groningen, the Netherlands

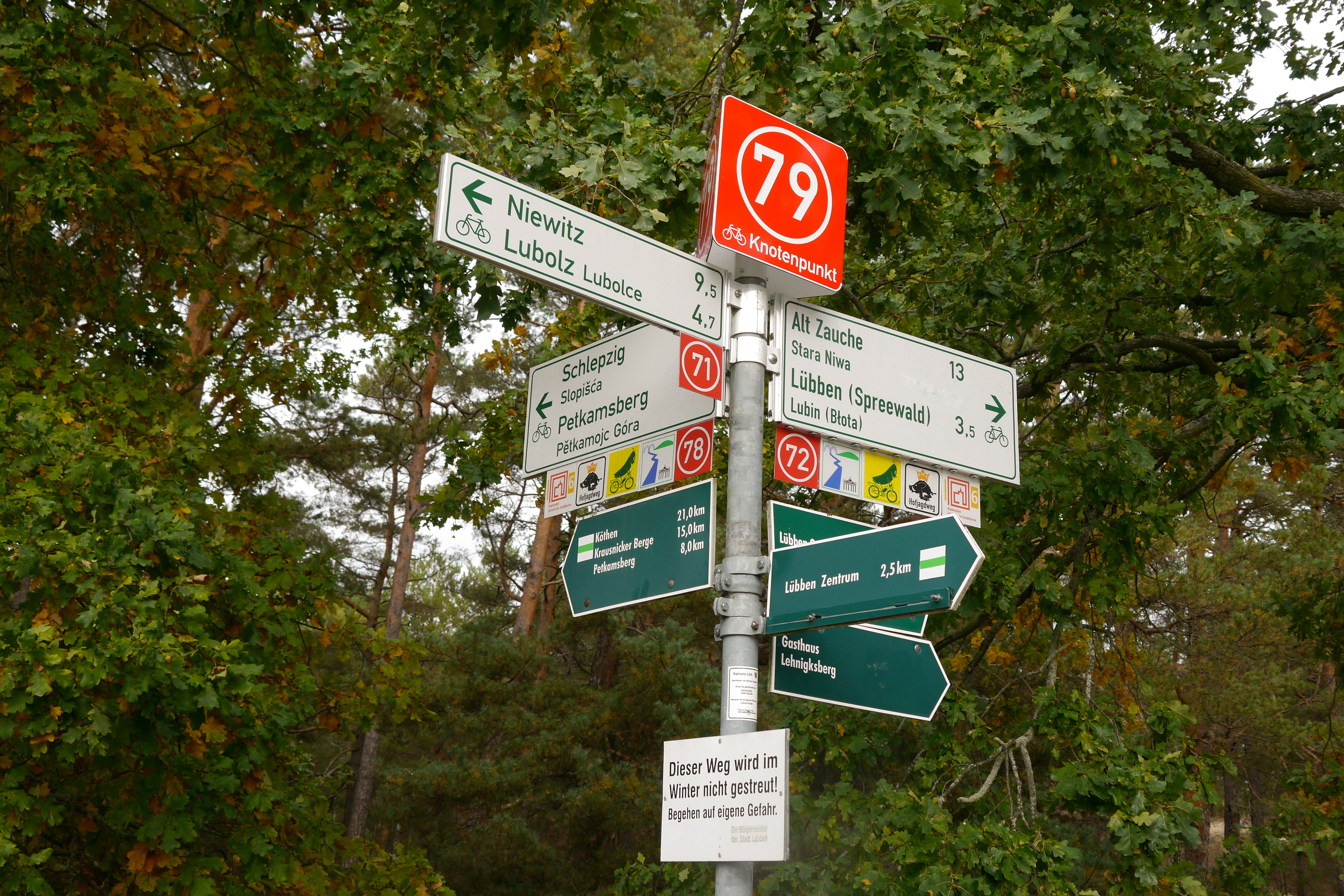
A node sign at node 79 points to nodes 71, 72, and 78. Dahme-Spreewald in Germany.

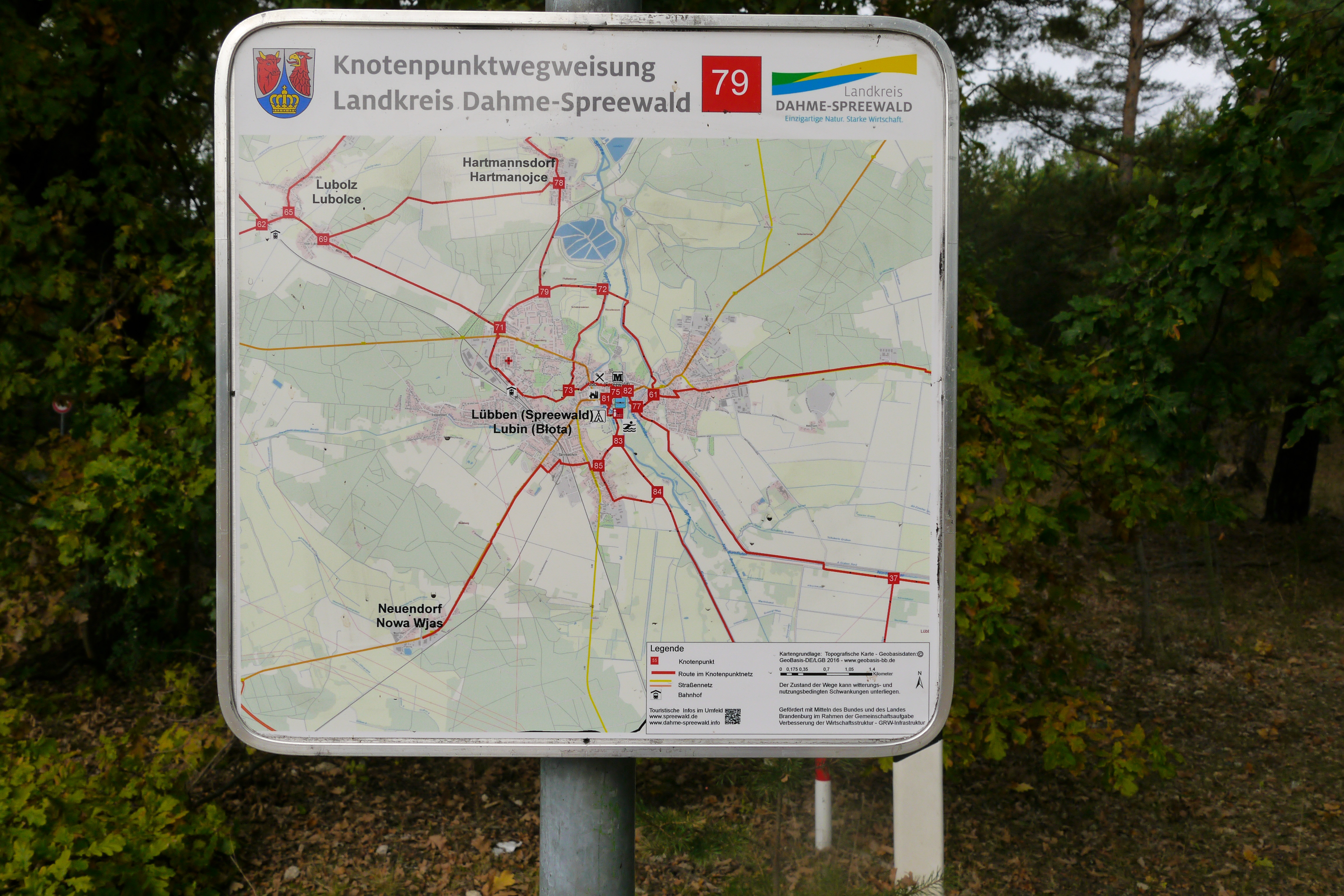
At the same node 79, a German roadside map shows Lübben.

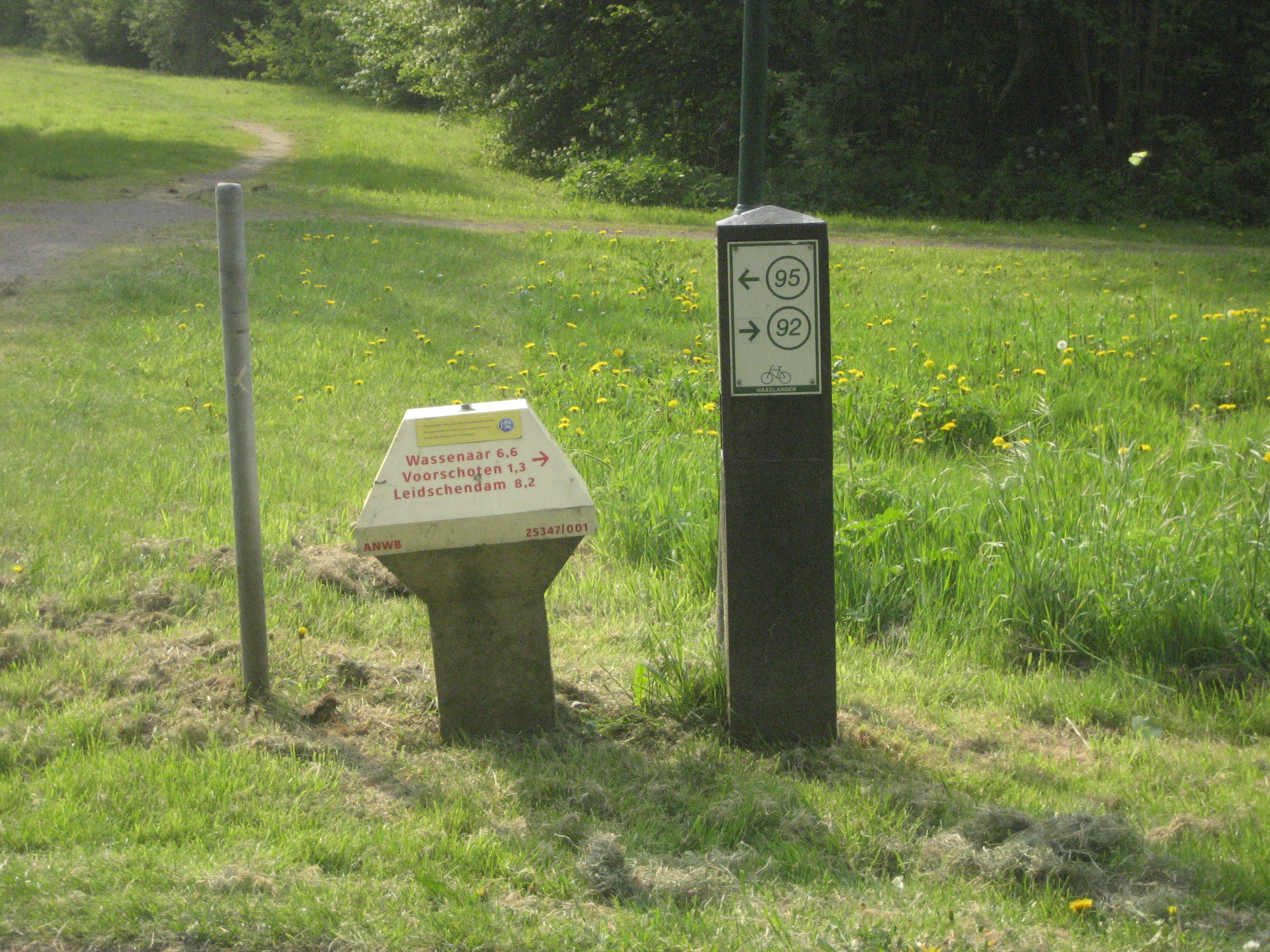
An internode sign alongside a padstool sign that gives local names and distances. The two are used together in the Netherlands.

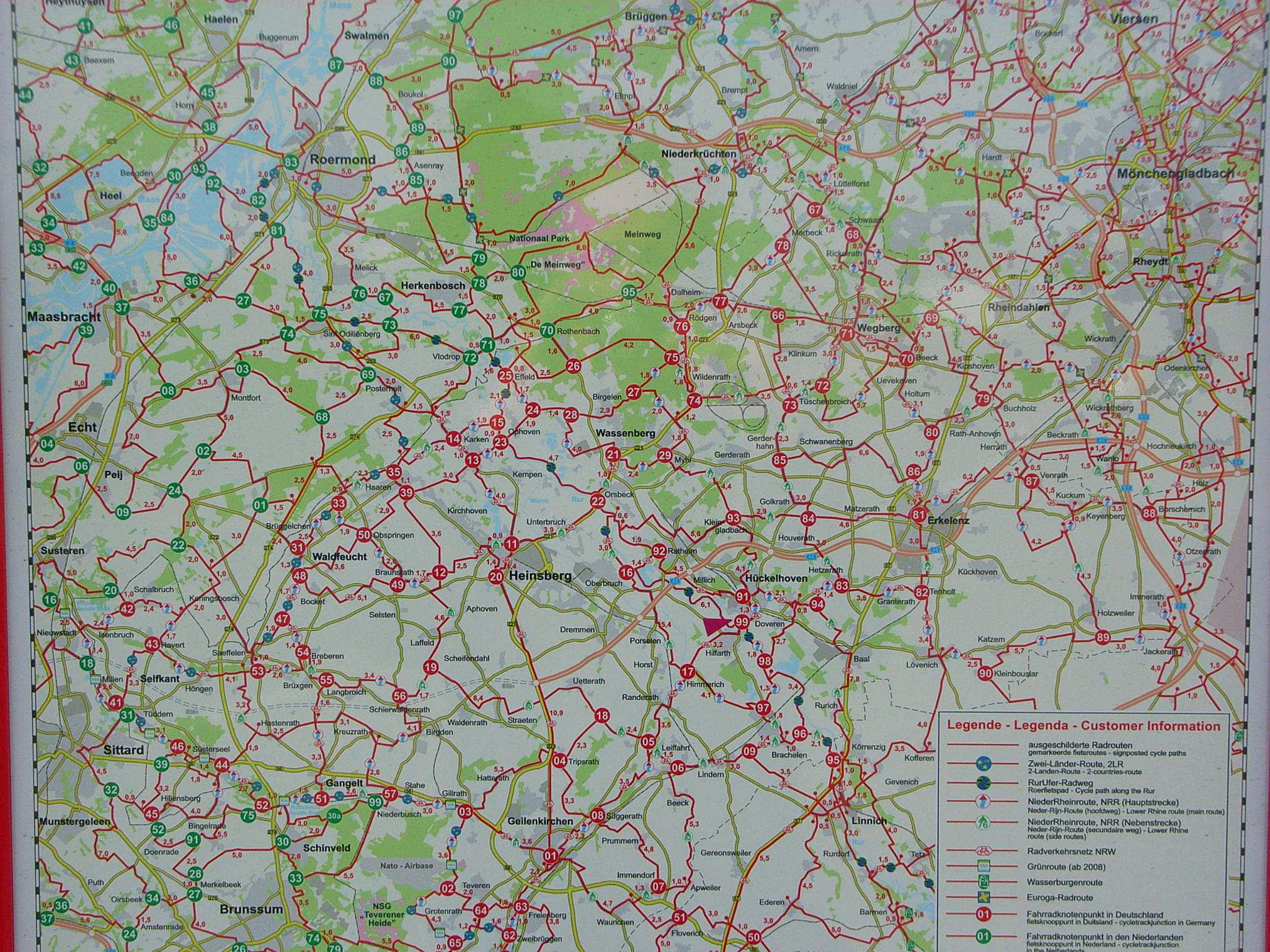
A German sign showing Dutch nodes in green (top left) and German nodes in red.

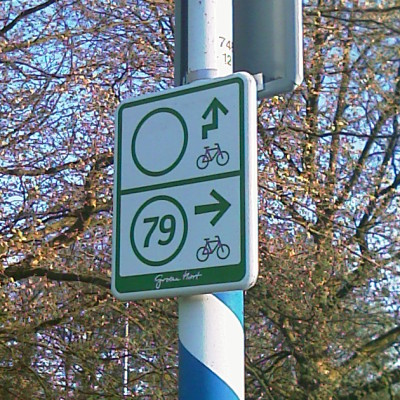
Brand-new internode sign, missing a number for a neighbouring node that has not been numbered yet. Groene Hart, the Netherlands.

== See also ==
- Cycling infrastructure
- Cycling network
- Utility cycling
- National cycling route network, contrasting non-modular systems of long-distance named routes.
- Route confirmation sign
