= Locale =

Locale may refer to:

- Locale (computer software), a set of parameters that defines the user's language, region and any special variant preferences that the user wants to see in their user interface—usually a locale identifier consists of at least a language identifier and a region identifier
- Locale (computer hardware), an abstraction of the concept of a localized set of hardware resources which are close enough to enjoy uniform memory access
- Locale (mathematics), a complete Heyting algebra used in pointless topology
- Locale (geographic), a geographic place where there is or was human activity other than populated places (such as cities, settlements, towns, or villages), mines, and dams
- Locale (Isabelle), a module of the Isabelle proof assistant
- Locale ('Ndrangheta), the main local organizational unit of the 'Ndrangheta with jurisdiction over criminal activities in an entire town or an area in a large urban center

== See also ==
- Local (disambiguation)
- Location (disambiguation)
