= Padstool (signage) =

Signage for cyclists

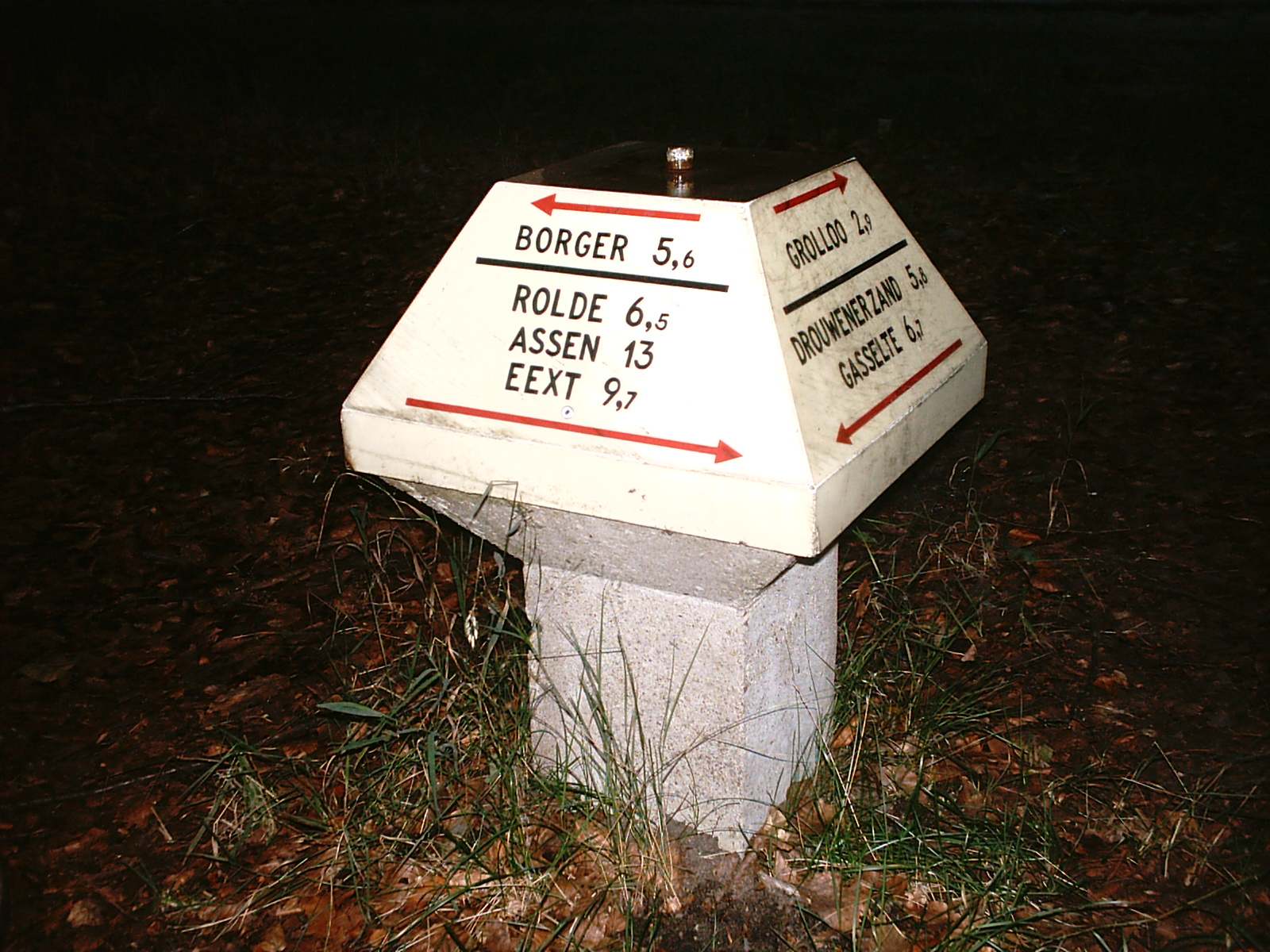
A padstool or fietspadstool (fiets)

Bicycle mushroom (Dutch: paddenstoel[en], fietspaddenstoel[en]) is a form of rural wayfinding signage for cyclists, in use in the Netherlands. They are named for their toadstool-like shape; "paddenstoel" first came into use as a nickname around 1921.

== Use ==
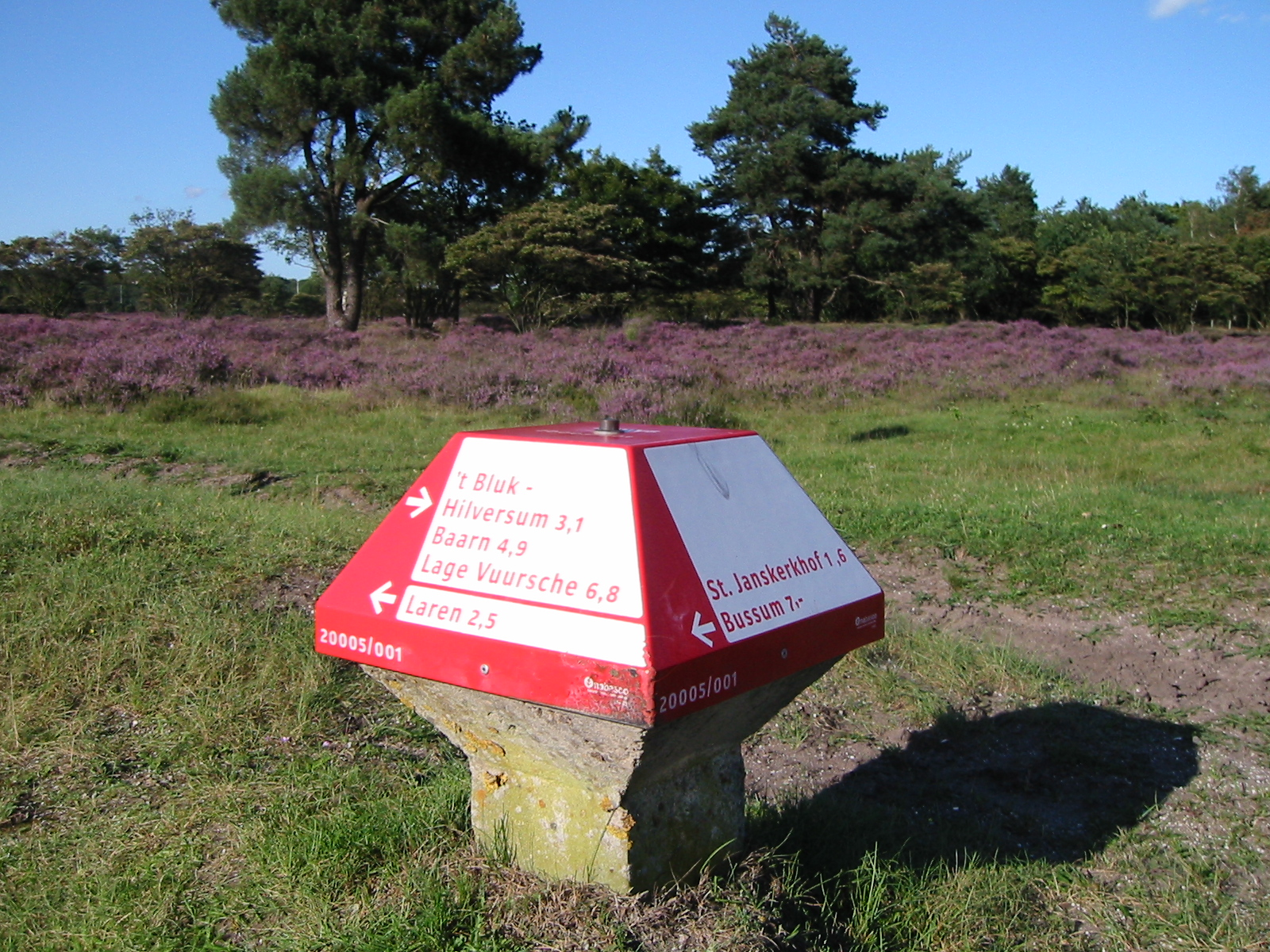
A padstool in an open area

Padstools are considered complementary to conventional signs on tall poles. In built-up areas, pole signs are preferred, but in natural areas such as moors, dunes, and woods, padstool signs are preferred. In natural areas, padstools are sufficiently visible to be spotted and read by the passing cyclist, without being so visible from far off that they spoil the views of the landscape.

Cyclists can look down on padstool signs, rather than having to look up away from the path. The signs are designed to be read quickly; there is a principle in the Netherlands that cyclists should not be slowed or stopped, even to read signage. A constant speed is more comfortable and efficient, and makes for shorter travel times.

== History ==
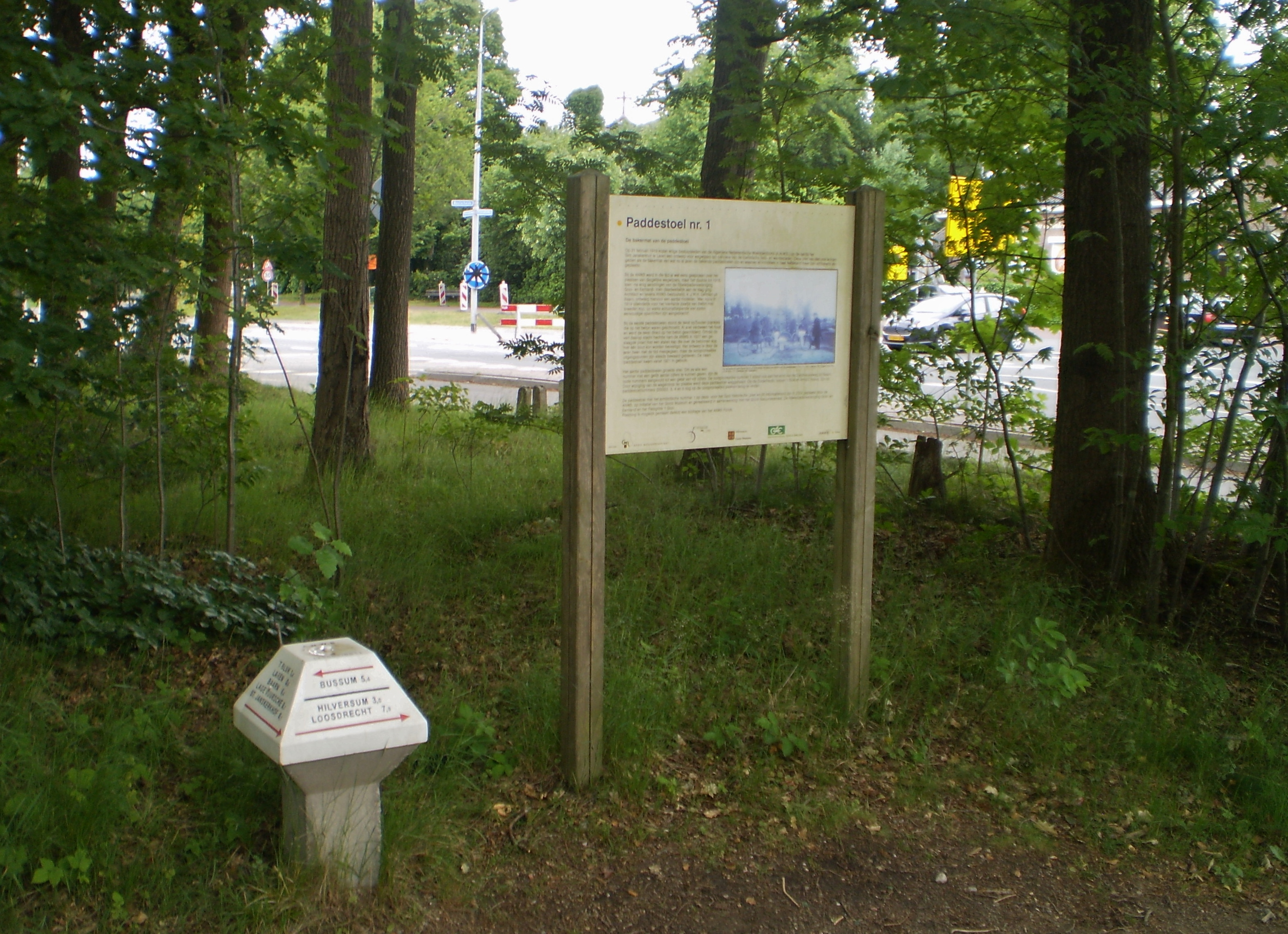
The location of the first padstool, set up on the 21st of February, 1919, with a 2004 sign explaining the history (readable image of sign).

The early twentieth century saw a dramatic increase in the number of cars; in 1920 there were about three thousand of them in the Netherlands. Cyclists' objections lead to the development of separate bike paths (paths deliberately made too narrow for cars), and these paths needed their own signage.

The Algemene Nederlandsche Wielrijdersbond (ANWB), disliking the cluttering of natural landscapes with pole-mounted bike signage, ran a prize competition in 1918 for a better design, intended to be locally-produced. Three prototypes were set up on the heath of Laren in early 1919. The winning design was by Johannes Hendrik Willem Leliman, a house architect from Baarn. The first twelve padstools were installed between Laren and Baarn in 1919, by the local Cycle Path Society (Note: the "Society for the Construction and Maintenance of Cycle Paths in the Gooi and Eemland Region", which merged with the local nature reserve foundation in 2021) and the ANWB, two closely-entwined organizations. In 1920, 13 more were installed, and by 1975 there were 32 hundred padstools. In 2019, there were about six thousand padstools in the Netherlands, clustered in certain areas.

From 2000, the ANWB gradually ceased being responsible for padstools, and in 2012, they became the responsibility of the Nationale Bewegwijzeringsdienst. The ANWB's historian attributes this to conflict with the Dutch transport minister in 1999, and says that the transfer has led to a decrease in the quality of maintenance.

Despite widespread use of satellite navigation, the signs were still widely used as of 2020. Unlike the newer numbered-node signs, they generally give local placenames, and so the two are used together.

== Design ==
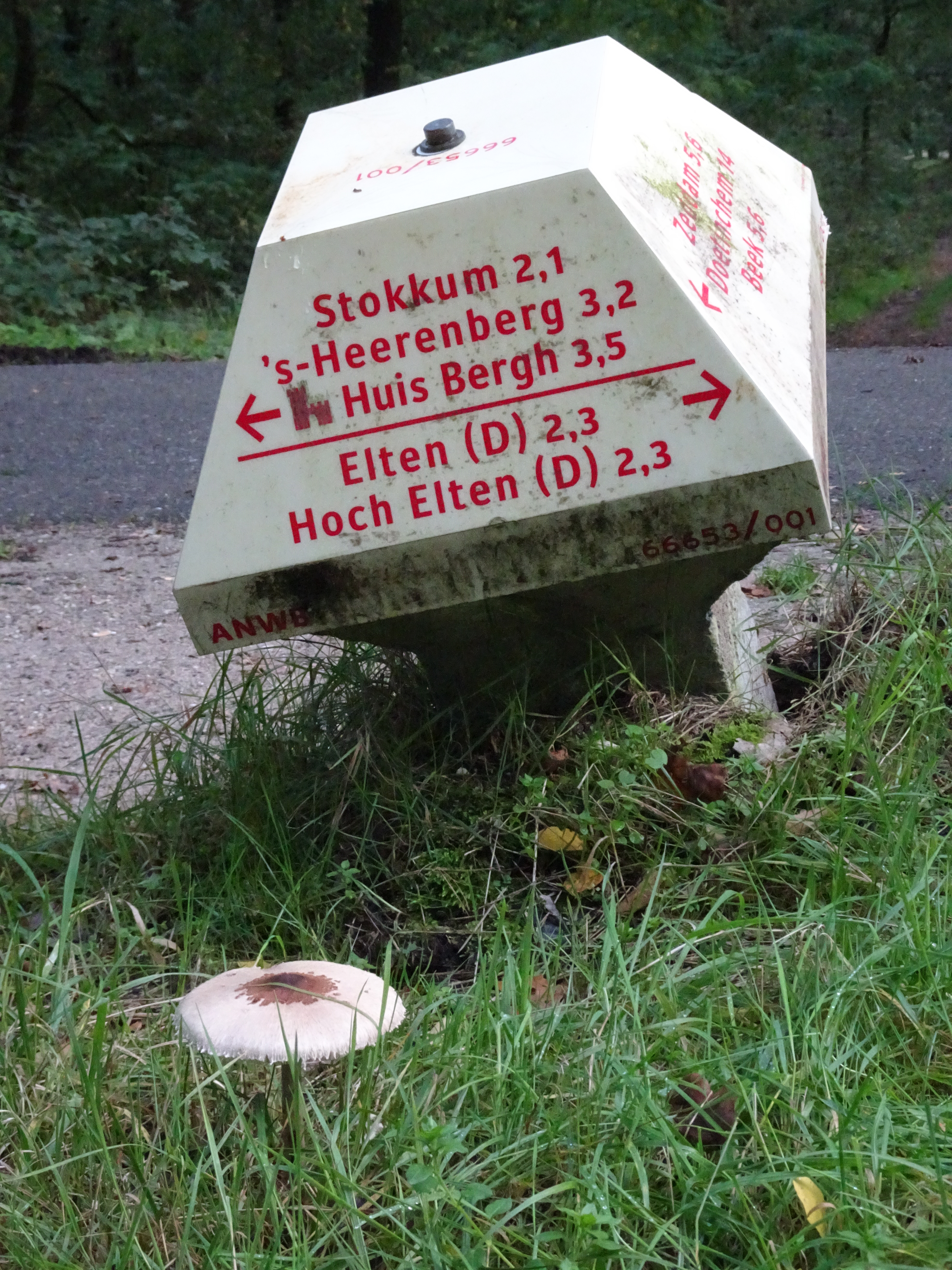
A vandalized fietspadstool with a living padstool.

The design has been described as simple to make, vandalproof, and inexpensive.

Padstools are generally made of concrete; this design choice was initially made partly because of the shortage of iron after World War I (earlier bike signs, from 1894, were made of metal). The early padstools were set into the ground, over a meter deep, and some weighed over 200 kilograms (the original design was 145 kilograms, set 1.5m deep, and required a team of three to install). By the 2020s, some padstools were still made of concrete, but some new designs were made of metal or organic-fiber-reinforced composites: coconut, hemp, flax, and jute fibers in resin, with development of more sustainable resins underway. The lightest weighed 10kg.

Initially the directions were painted directly onto the concrete, but in 1927 the ANWB developed a steel cap with a hole in top that screwed onto a central nut. This was easier to maintain in good condition.

Since 2003, the fietspadstool's colouring has been standardized, the cap being red with white sign areas. The lettering was likewise standardized to red, in a typeface designed by Gerard Unger, and experimentally found to be the fastest to read. These changes met with strong reactions and controversy.

== In culture ==
Fietspadstools have been called "iconic", and are associated with Dutch bicycle culture. The ANWB considers them an icon of the ANWB, and has often used images of fietspadstools in ads.

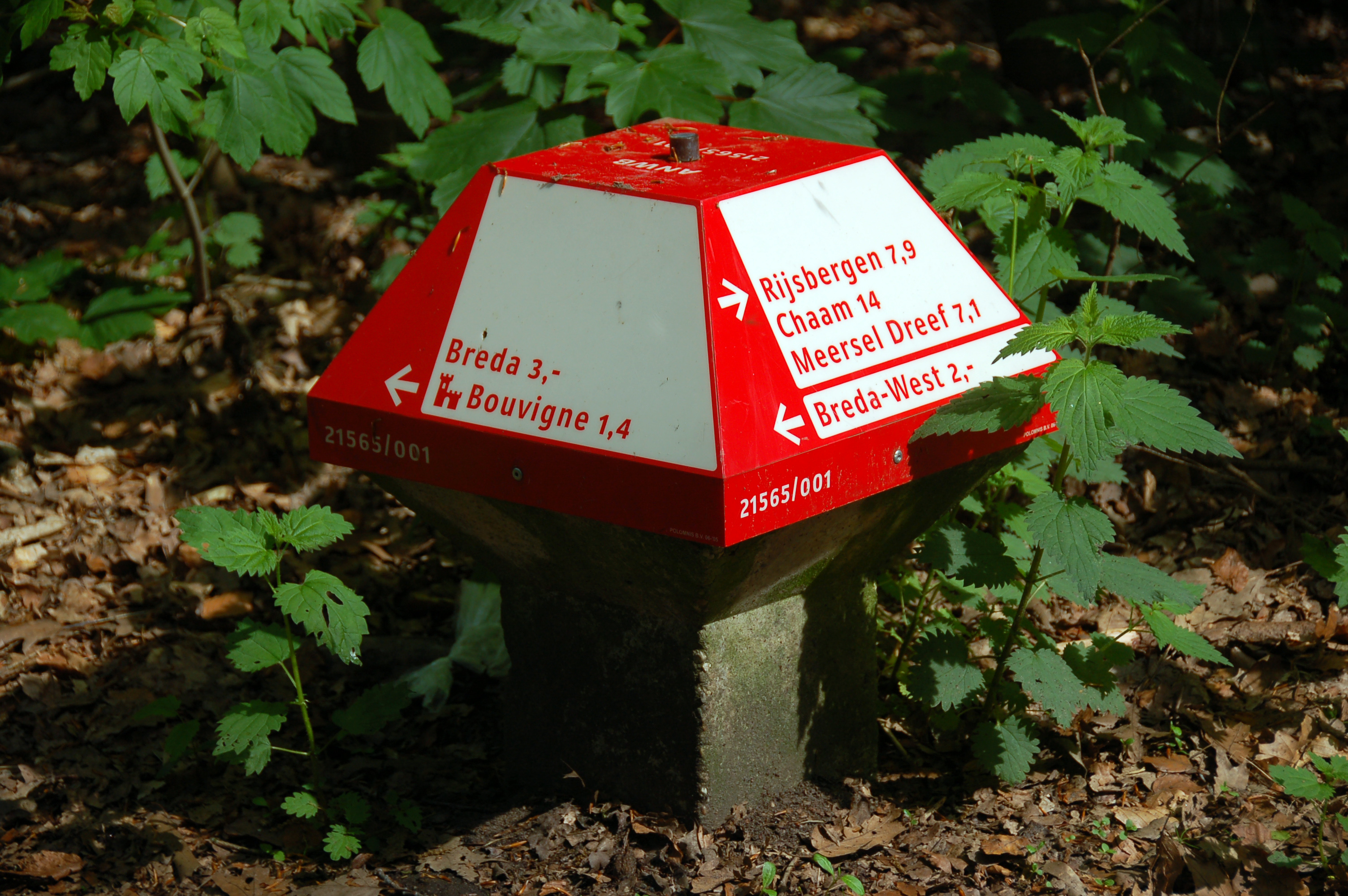
New 21st-century standardized cap colouring

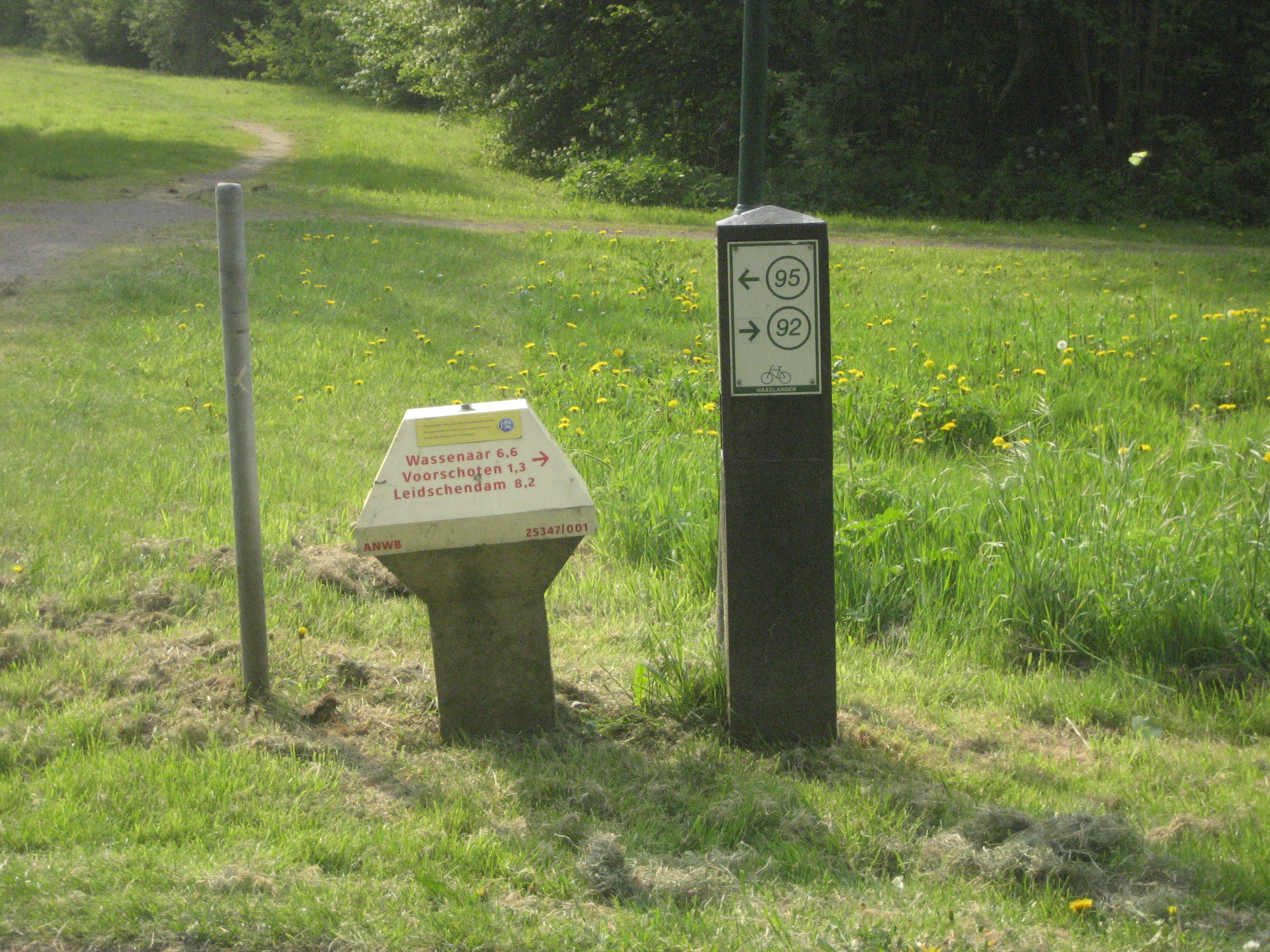
A padstool sign and an internode sign for the numbered-node cycle network.

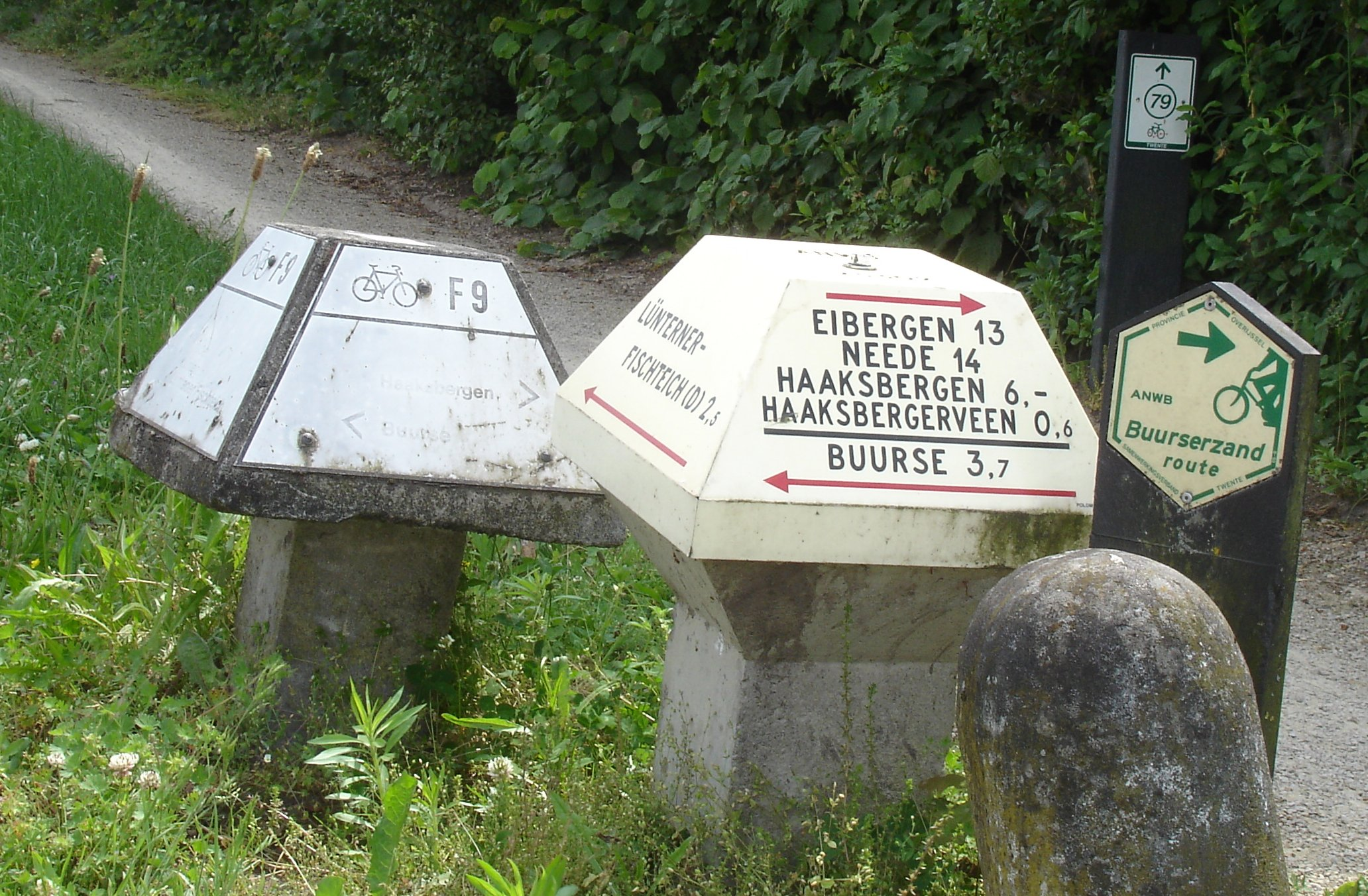
Four bike signs near the Dutch-German border; a Dutch mushroom with a metal cap, a German mushroom with metal plates, a flat named-route sign, and an internode sign.

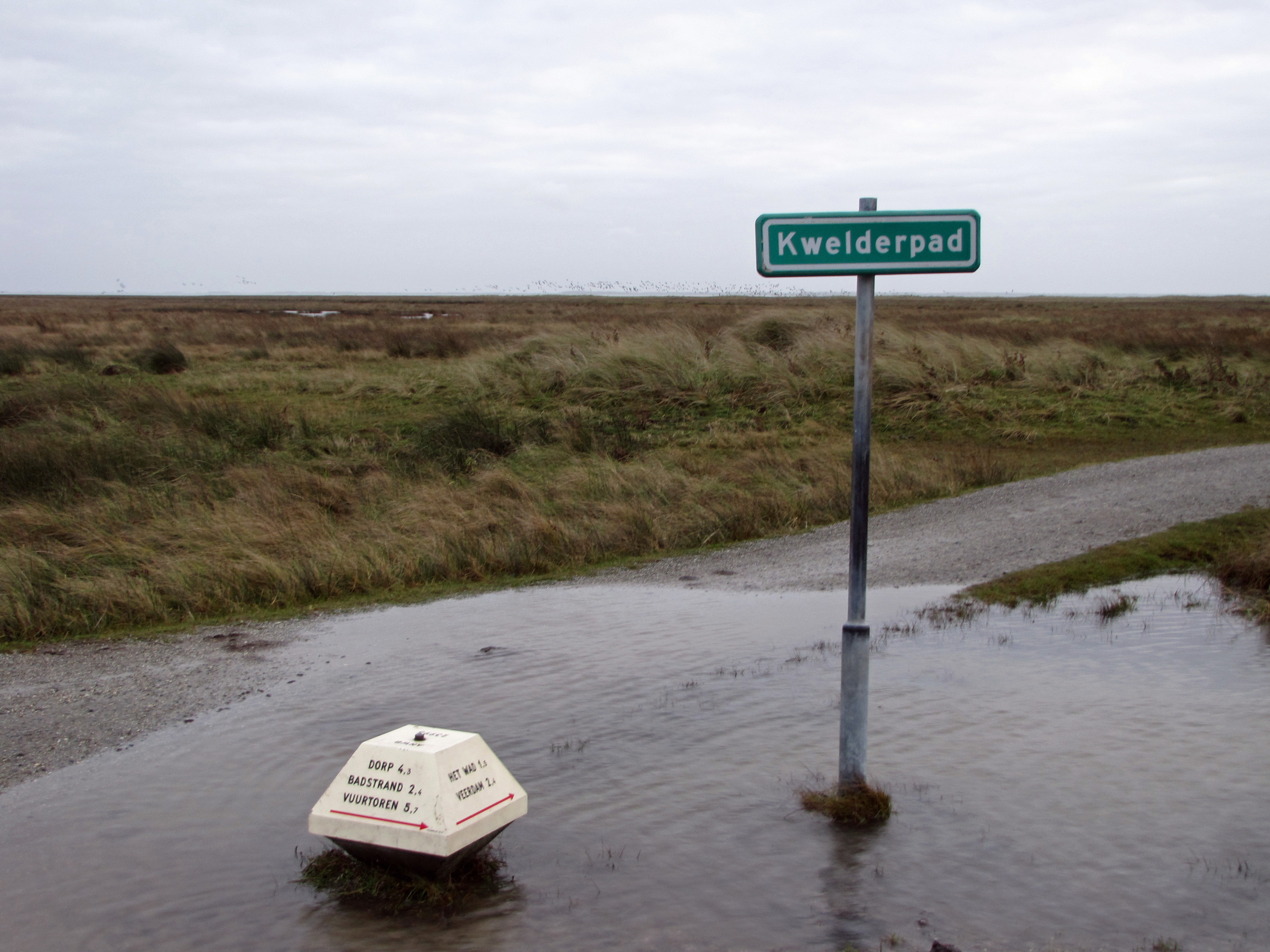
Weather resistance

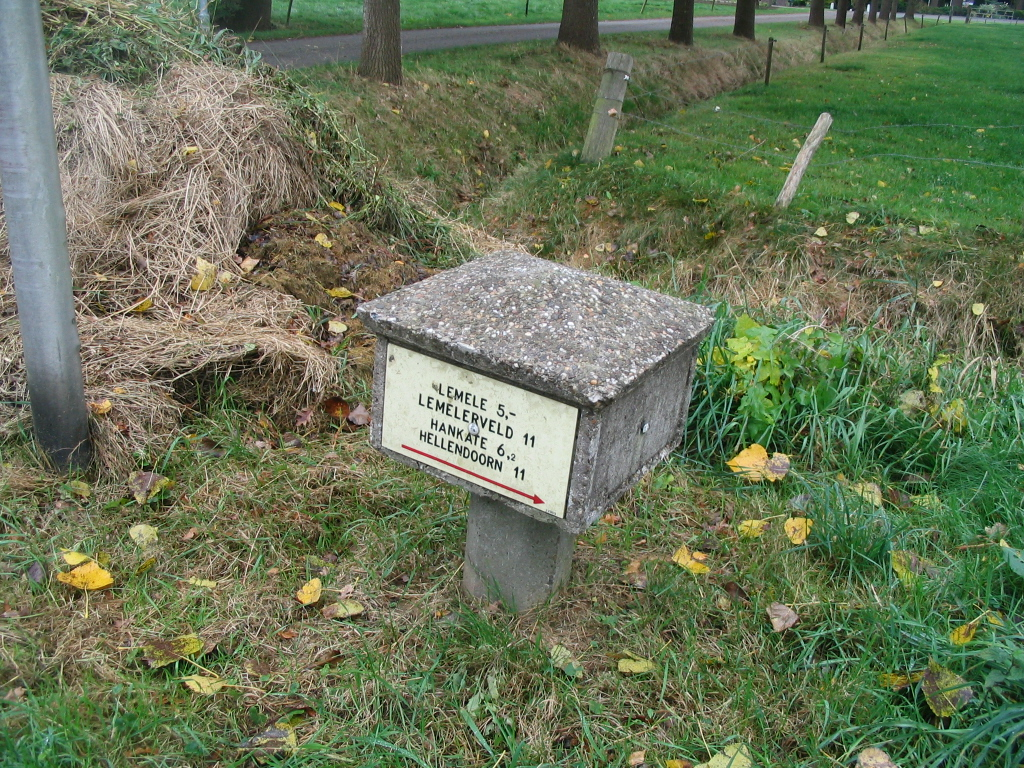
An unusual square model

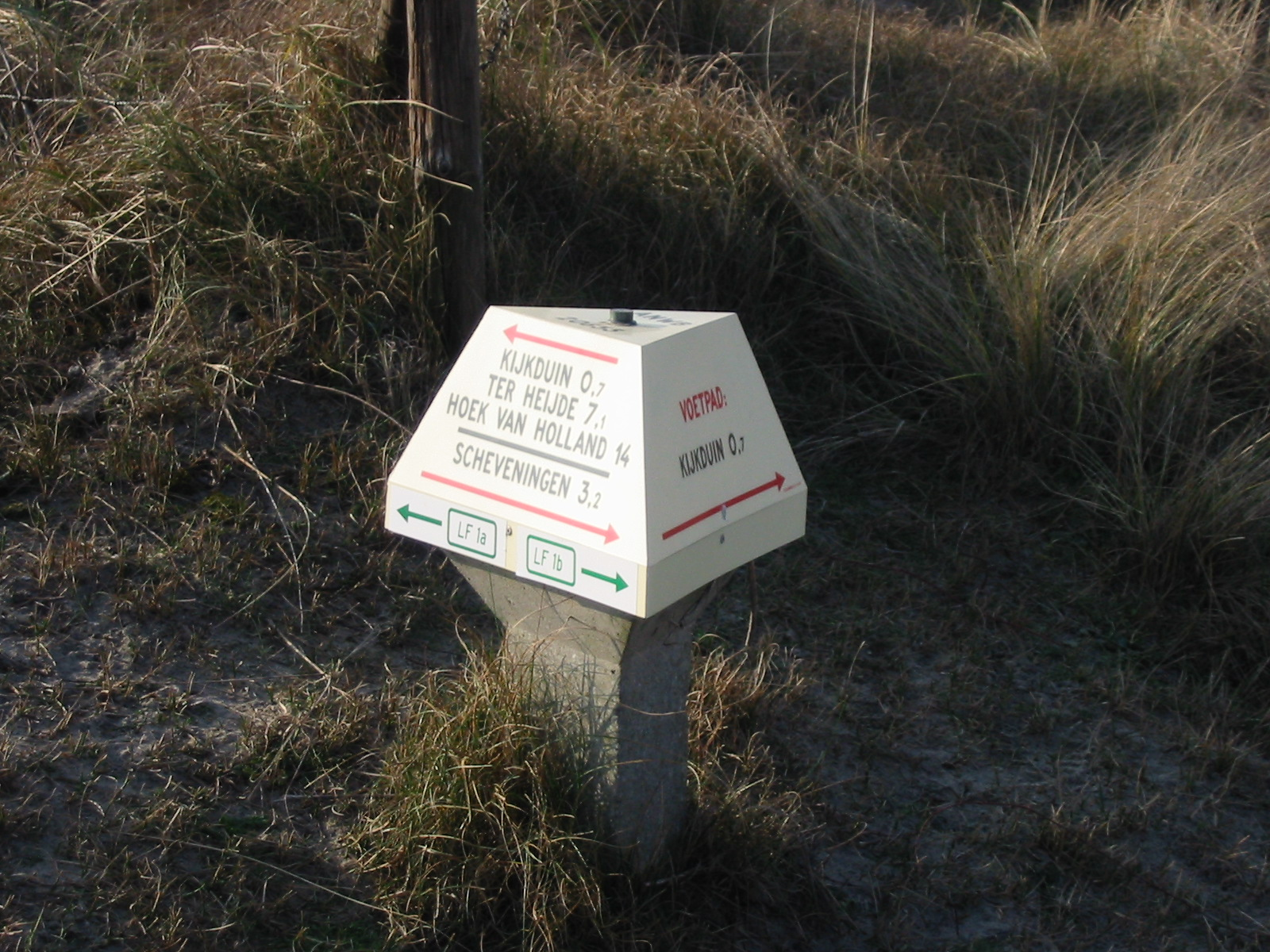
An unusual three-sided padstool.

== See also ==
- Cycling in the Netherlands
- Numbered-node cycle network, a complementary signage system
