= Location (disambiguation) =

A location is a fixed geographical point.

Location may also refer to:

== Arts and entertainment ==
- Location (EP), by the Grand Opening, or the title song, 2005
- "Location" (Dave song), 2019
- "Location" (Karol G song), 2021
- "Location" (Khalid song), 2016
- "Location", a song by Alex Calder from Time, 2013
- "Location", a song by Chela Rivas
- "Location", a song by Playboi Carti from Playboi Carti, 2017
- Filming location, a place where some or all of a film or television series is produced

== Technology ==
- HTTP location, an HTTP header field
- Uniform Resource Locator (URL)
- Locality of reference

== Other uses ==
- Location (sign language), the location of the hands when signing
- Location, the placement of a facility in the facility location problem
- Location, in statistics, the shift of distribution in a location parameter

== See also ==
- Location parameter, a parameter of a probability distribution indicating the distribution's central tendency
- Locale (disambiguation)
- Locate (disambiguation)
- Locator (disambiguation)
- Locution (disambiguation)
- Allocation (disambiguation)
- Place (disambiguation)
- Position (disambiguation)
