= Locate =

Locate may refer to:

- Locate (finance)
- Locator software, in computing
- Locate (Unix), Linux command to find files
- Locate di Triulzi, an Italian commune of Lombardy
- Locate Varesino, an Italian commune of Lombardy

== See also ==
- Find (disambiguation)
- Move (disambiguation)
- Location (disambiguation)
- Locator (disambiguation)
