= Positioning =

Positioning may refer to:

- Positioning (marketing), creating an identity in the minds of a target market
- Positioning theory, a theory in social psychology
- Positioning (critical literacy), reader context
- Positioning (telecommunications), a technology to approximate where a mobile phone temporarily resides
- Grappling position, the positioning and holds of combatants engaged in grappling
- Geopositioning, determining the location of an object in space

== See also ==
- Position (disambiguation)
- Real-time locating
