= Market allocation scheme =

Agreements in which competitors divide markets among themselves

Market allocation or market division schemes are agreements in which competitors divide markets among themselves. In such schemes, competing firms allocate specific customers or types of customers, products, or territories among themselves. For example, one competitor will be allowed to sell to, or bid on contracts let by, certain customers or types of customers. In return, he or she will not sell to, or bid on contracts let by, customers allocated to the other competitors. In other schemes, competitors agree to sell only to customers in certain geographic areas and refuse to sell to, or quote intentionally high prices to, customers in geographic areas allocated to conspirator companies.

== Antitrust ==
According to Adam Smith, people of the same trade seldom meet without the conversation turning to conspiring ways to raise prices and defraud the public. Market allocation is generally regarded as illegal in the United States, unless the Department of Treasury or equivalent body authorizes it.
