= Tax-allocation district =

A tax-allocation district (TAD), also known as tax increment financing, is a defined area where real estate property tax monies gathered above a certain threshold for a certain period of time (typically 25 years) to be used for a specified improvement. The funds raised from a TAD are placed in a tax-free bond (finance) where the money can continue to grow. These improvements are typically for revitalization and especially to complete redevelopment efforts.

Tax-increment financing has attracted much criticism as merely a subsidy to connected developers. California, where the practice began, has discontinued their use though it will be paying off debt on previous formed districts for years to come.

Enactment of a TAD typically requires approval of all local governments who will be giving-up taxes, thus a project within a municipality will also require approval of the county's commission (or its local equivalent), and the board of the school district, in addition to the city council and possibly township board of supervisors (if applicable).

This differs from an improvement district, which the property owners agree to pay extra for improvements. That is only an option for an area which is already in good economic health.

== Examples ==
- In the U.S. state of Georgia, TAD legislation was created in 1985 and is described in the OCGA section 36-44-5.
