= Position =

Position often refers to:

- Position (geometry), the spatial location (rather than orientation) of an entity
- Position, a job or occupation
- Position, another way to say "championship place" or "rank" (Winner, runner-up, second runner-up, etc.)

Position may also refer to:

== Games and recreation ==
- Position (poker), location relative to the dealer
- Position (team sports), a player role within a team

== Human body ==
- Human position, the spatial relation of the human body to itself and the environment
  - Position (obstetrics), the orientation of a baby prior to birth
  - Positions of the feet in ballet
  - Position (music), the location of the hand on a musical instrument
  - Proprioception, the sense of the relative position of neighbouring parts of the body
  - Asana (yoga), the location and posture of the body while practicing yoga
  - Sex position, the arrangement of bodies during sexual intercourse

== Humanities, law, economics and politics ==
- Philosophical theory, a belief or set of beliefs about questions in philosophy
- Position (finance), commitments in a financial marketplace
- Social position, the position of an individual in a society and culture
- Political position within a political spectrum

== Science and mathematics ==
- Position (vector), a mathematical identification of relative location
- Position in positional notation of mathematical operations

== Other uses ==
- The Position, a novel by Meg Wolitzer
- Positions (book), a book by Jacques Derrida
- Positions (album), a 2020 album by Ariana Grande
  - "Positions" (song), the album's title track
- The Positions, 2015 album by Gang of Youths

== See also ==
- Location (disambiguation)
- Positioning (disambiguation)
