= Locution =

Locution can refer to:

- a figure of speech
- Locution (paranormal), a mode of supernatural revelation
- Locution (catchphrase), a particular word, phrase, or expression, especially associated with a particular person, region, group, or cultural level
- Interior locution, the phenomenon when a person reportedly receives a set of ideas, thoughts, or visions from an outside spiritual source

== See also ==
- Locutionary act, the performance of an utterance in linguistics and the philosophy of mind.
