= Online locator service =

Tool for finding business locations

Results from a query of a selected location using walmart.com's store finder

An online locator service (also known as location finder, store finder, or store locator, or similar) is a feature found on websites of businesses with multiple locations that allows visitors to the site to find locations of the business within proximity of an address or postal code or within a selected region. Types of businesses that often have this feature include chain retailers, hotels, restaurants, and other businesses that can be found in multiple metropolitan areas.

The locator also provides important information about each location, including its address, phone number, hours of operation, services provided, and sometimes directions to the location. On many sites, searches can be narrowed to locations providing certain services not provided at all locations (e.g. 24-hour operation, handicap accessibility, pharmacies).

Location finders often operate in conjunction with a well-known online map service, such as Google Maps, MapQuest, or Bing Maps, allowing the user to see on a map where the particular location is found on a map.

== Software ==
Store locators use locator software in order to allow visitors to find nearby stores and business locations. In a common form, a visitor inputs a ZIP code and the locator returns all locations in a database within a specified radius. It is often used in conjunction with mapping/driving direction software on brick and click corporate websites to help customers locate a physical business location.

Some online locators determine user location from the user's IP address, rather than asking a user to input his or her location. The company utilizes IP geolocation software from Digital Element to power the “My Local Ace” section of its website. Based on a site visitor’s location, the website can show the visitor how many stores are in their area, as well as a city-level locator map to help the customer find the store closest to their address.

Create a beautiful Store Locator widget only using Google Sheets and zero coding effort. Add a fully interactive map to websites by copy-paste method. Store Locator app works on WordPress, Shopify, Wix, Squarespace and more
