= Voie verte =

Autonomous communication route used in France

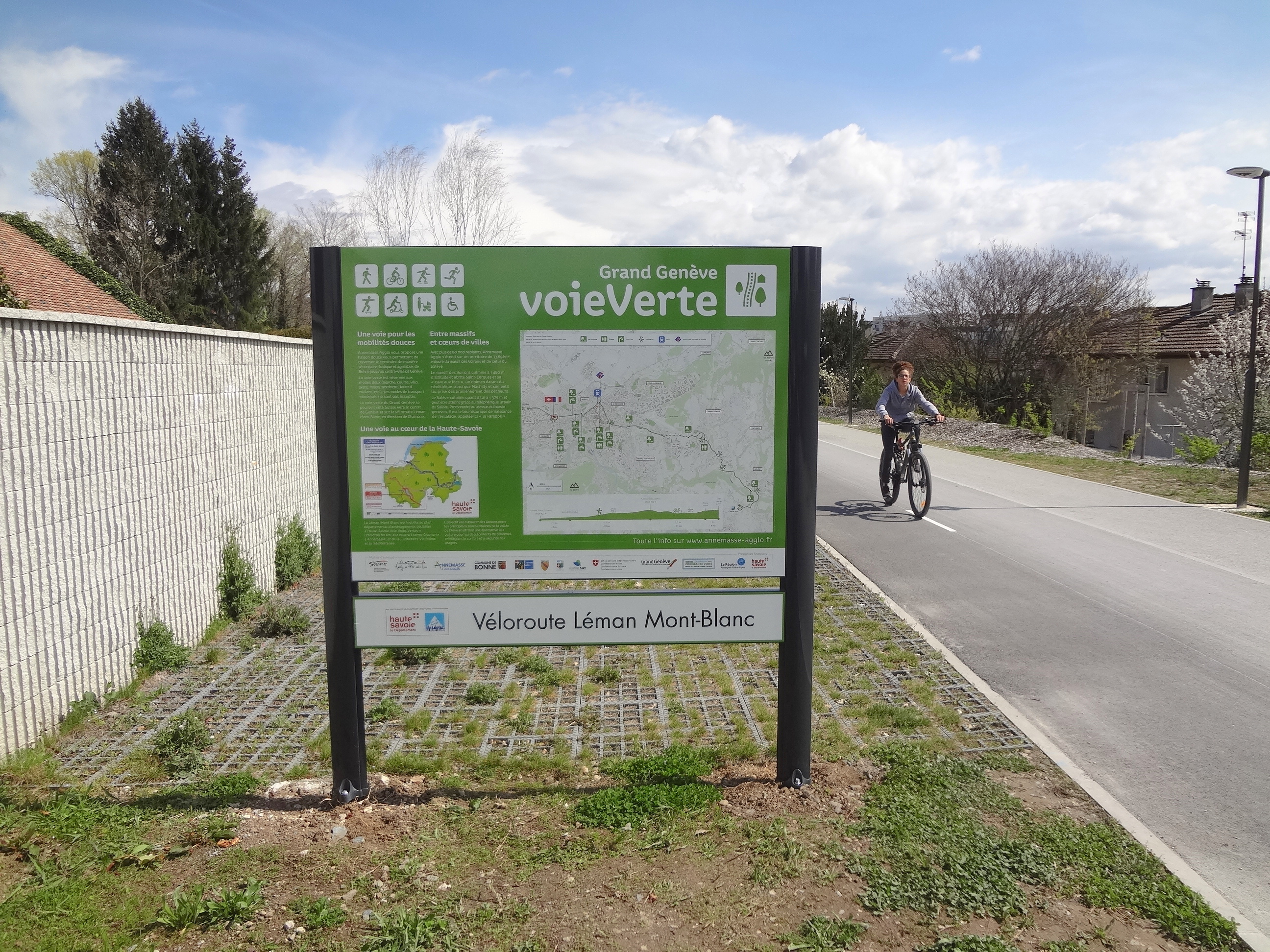
Voie verte between Chêne-Bourg (Geneva, Switzerland) and Ambilly (Haute-Savoie, France)

A voie verte or greenway is an autonomous communication route reserved for non-motorized traffic, such as pedestrians and cyclists. Voies vertes are developed with a view to integrated development that enhances the environment, heritage, quality of life, and user-friendliness. In Europe, they have been organized since October 1997 within the framework of the European Green Network to coordinate and regulate uses often prohibited in certain countries or that compete with motorized practices.

== Context ==
In this regard, towpaths, old rural paths, and disused railway tracks are privileged mediums for the development of voies vertes. If managed appropriately (through sustainable gardening and restoration ecology, and without the use of pesticides in the surroundings, which can then potentially play a role in the green infrastructure and blue network), voies vertes are one of the elements of sustainable development policies in the relevant areas.

For English speakers, greenways refers to voies vertes, but also more generally to "a road that is good from an environmental point of view" (Turner, 1995, or - in England, according to a survey cited by Turner in 2006: "a linear space containing elements planned, designed, and managed for multiple purposes, including ecological, recreational, cultural, aesthetic, and others compatible with the concept of sustainable land use") or a wide range of landscape and urban planning strategies including, to varying degrees, an environmental concern associated with transportation infrastructure, the edges of which have often acquired special value and are sometimes associated with the concept of a biological corridor in Europe.

== History and evolution ==
From 1975 to 1995, voies vertes proliferated significantly in the urban landscapes of so-called developed countries. For example, by 1995, more than 500 communities were building them in North America alone. They address new human needs while also extending some of the functions of ancient rural roads. More than simple facilities or landscaping, they increasingly aim to provide a counterbalance to the loss of natural landscape in the context of increasing urbanization and agricultural industrialization. As times changed, the notion of chemins verts ou corridors verts evolved to meet new needs and challenges.

Three distinct stages (or "generations") of voies vertes can be identified as forms of urban and peri-urban landscape:

1. The first generation consisted of wooded paths, bordered by grassy and flowered embankments or ancestral walking paths, complementary to road networks;
2. Recreational and discovery trails, or routes away from traffic zones, providing access to rivers, streams, ridges, and urban fabric, allotment gardens, etc., followed. Generally, automobiles were excluded (Reserved lanes);
3. The latest generation is often more multifunctional, primarily reserved for soft travel and leisure, sometimes also for landscape enhancement, while also seeking to address certain vital needs of fauna, and flora (and sometimes fungi, with the conservation of deadwood). Ditches, swales, and flood-prone areas can also play a roleb in water and flood management (in urban or rural areas). Path edges are designed and managed to act as wildlife corridors with a potential buffer strip. Like grassy strips or other types of buffer zones, some voies vertes also contribute to improving water quality (with, for example, ditches and swales serving as natural wetland). They also provide resources for outdoor education, landscape discovery, and interpretation. Planners must therefore adopt multidisciplinary approaches, sometimes merging formerly opposing disciplines such as civil engineering, architecture, landscape ecology, sustainable gardening, or wetland ecology. In France, the term voies vertes tends to overlap with that of the voies vertes in the cycle route and voies vertes network.

== Network status ==
=== Belgium ===
In Belgium, a network of 2200 km of voies vertes was already defined in 2003, of which 900 km were developed.

In the Walloon Region, they form the RAVeL network.

In Flanders, there is a network of towpaths, railway trails, and other independent cycle paths. Most are integrated into the numbered-node cycle networks of the provinces, or belong to LF-routes (Dutch: lange-afstandsfietsroute, long-distance tourist cycle routes) or the bicycle highway network (Dutch: fietssnelweg, utilitarian voies vertes providing direct routes between and around cities).

=== Netherlands ===
In the Netherlands, the situation and terminology are comparable to Flanders, with the difference that there are few rail trails and many other independent cycle paths.

Voie verte and cycle routes in France, open or planned in 2011.

=== France ===
In France, a decree of 16 September 2004 introduced voies vertes into the Highway Code: voies vertes are defined as roads "exclusively reserved for the circulation of non-motorized vehicles, pedestrians and horse riders."

=== Switzerland ===
In Switzerland, there's a cross-border voie verte from Geneva to Annemasse. A voie verte through Lausanne (along the railroad tracks) is programmed for completion in 2018.

== Features and benefits ==
They are most often developed on old railway lines, towpaths, roads closed to automobile traffic, and cultural routes (Roman roads, pilgrimage routes). They have certain characteristics:

1. Ease of access: their low or nonexistent slopes allow for use by all types of users, including those with reduced mobility;
2. Safety due to their physical separation from roadways and appropriate intersection design;
3. Continuity of routes with alternative solutions in case of obstacles;
4. Environmental respect along the paths and encouragement for users to respect it.

Voies vertes also offer services, located in preserved old facilities such as former railway stations and lockkeeper's houses. These services can be of various types: accommodation, museums, bike rental, equestrian accommodation, community centers, etc. They cater to both local users and tourists. voies vertes are provided with information (maps, brochures, etc.) about the route itself and nearby sites. For example, several tens of kilometers of the former coastal railway of the Chemins de Fer de Provence have been converted into a cycle path between Toulon and Pramousquier (in the municipality of Le Lavandou).

This example illustrates the main criticism of voies vertes, namely the fact that they sometimes contribute to downgrading and therefore definitively condemning railway lines that could potentially be reopened for collectivization and decarbonization of travel in peri-urban or rural areas, instead of taking up space on roads. This competition between two complementary modes in an era of energy transition inducing increasing decarbonization of travel can therefore be ironic.

== Photographs ==
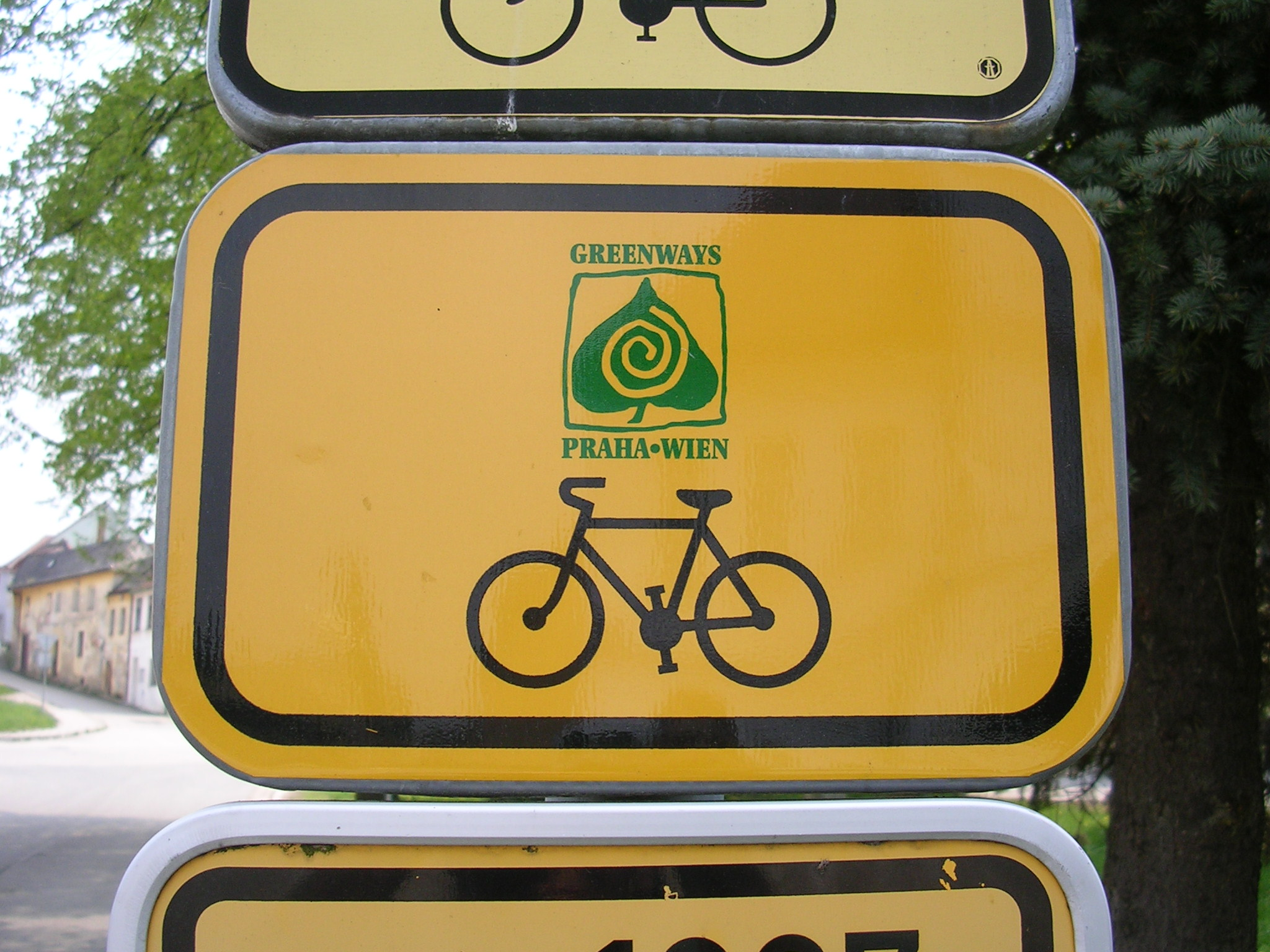
Voie verte from Prague to Vienna (Nová Bystřice, Czech Republic)

French voie verte signage

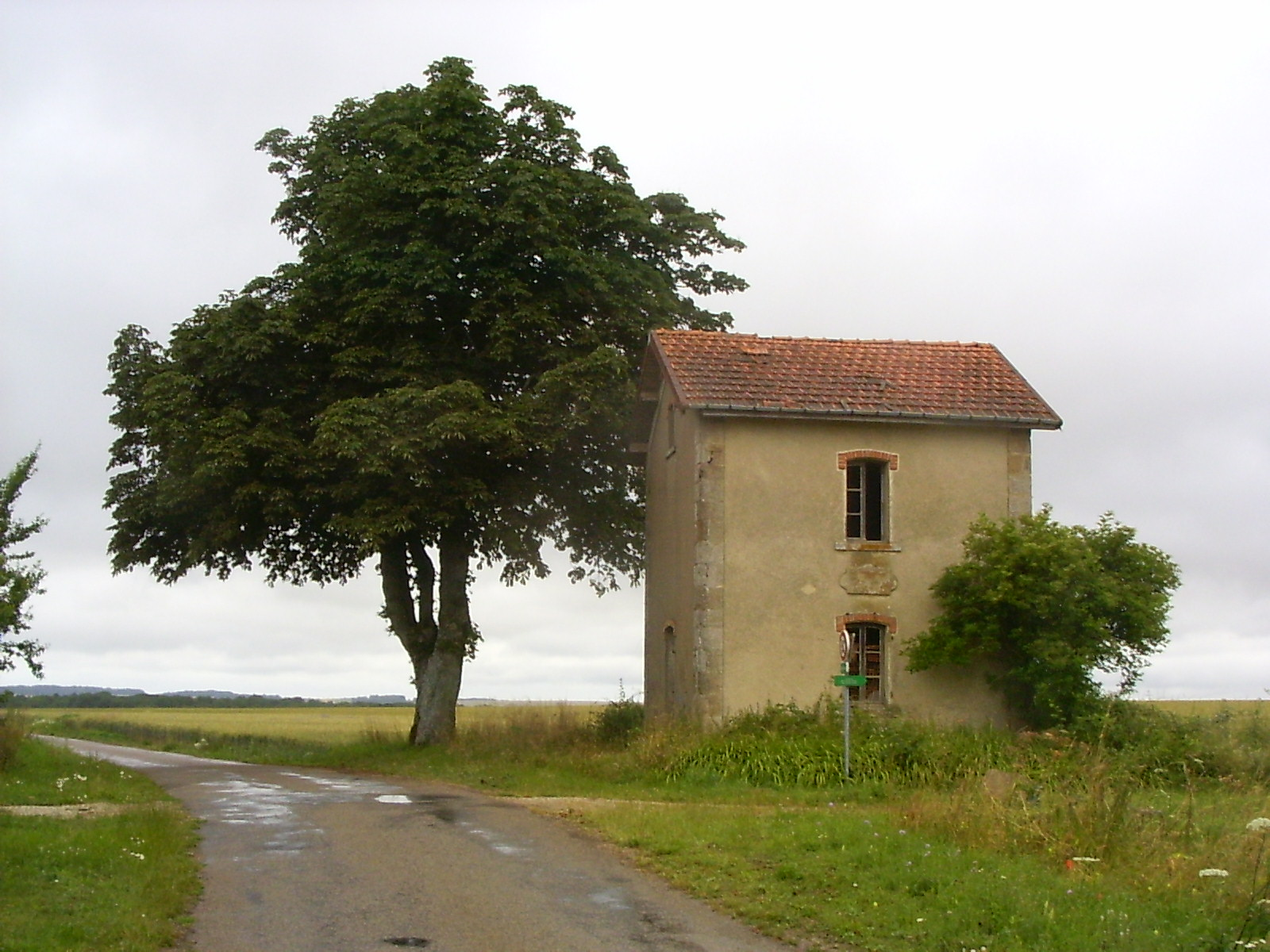
Voie verte built on a former railway line in Langres

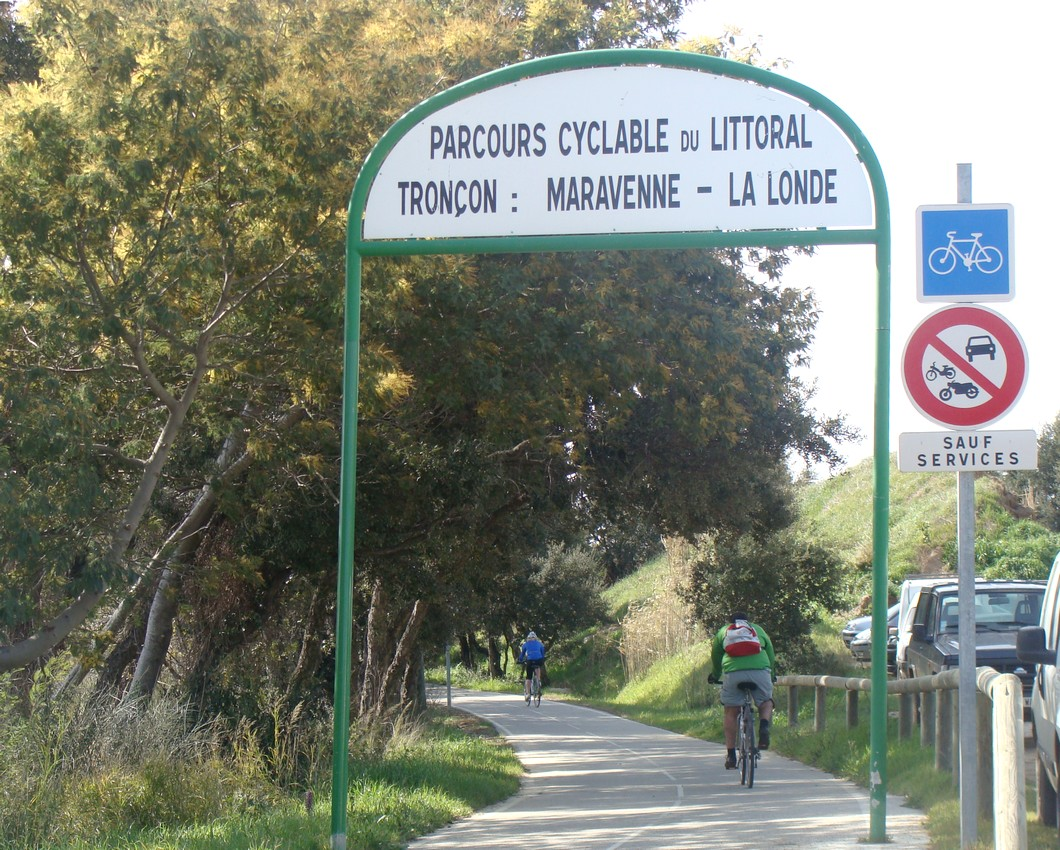
Cycling path arranged on the former coastal railway line of Var.

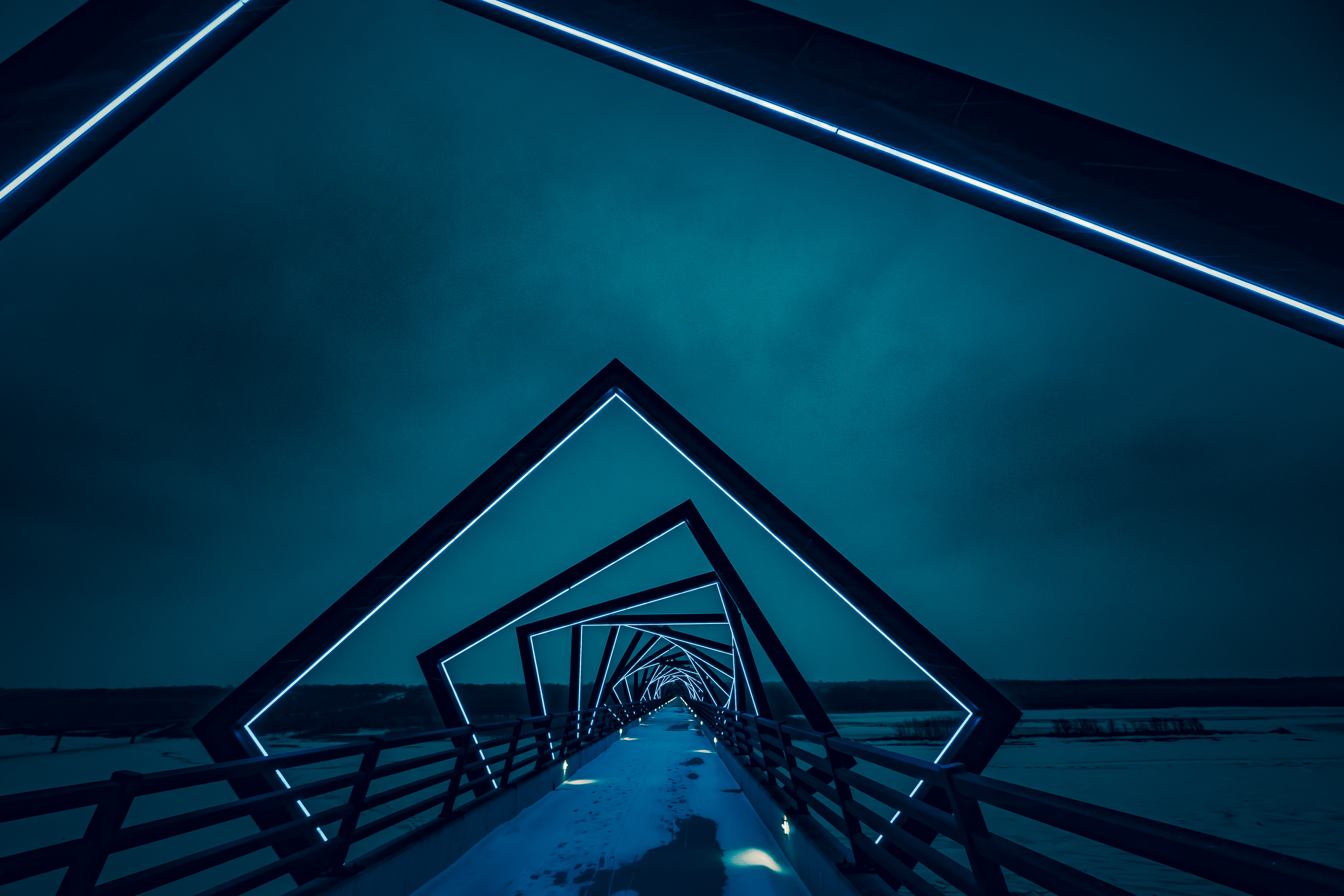
High Trestle Trail, rail trail in Madrid, Iowa, USA.

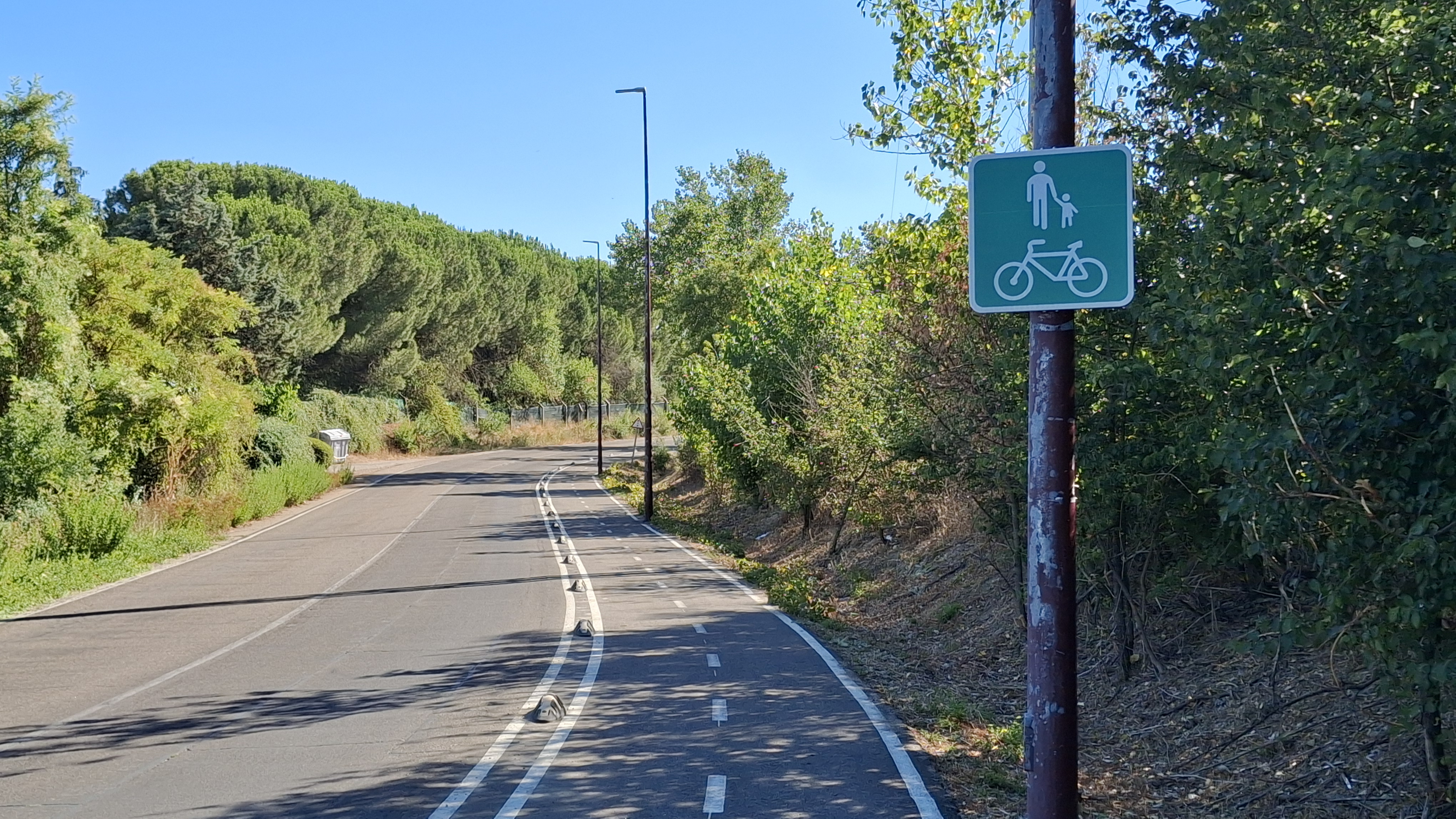
Cycle and pedestrian path (senda ciclopeatonal) in Valladolid, Spain.

== See also ==
- Aménagement cyclable
- Greenway (landscape)
- RAVeL network
- Green infrastructure
- Long-distance cycling route
- Rail trail
- Otago Central Rail Trail
