= Bicycle highway =

Transport infrastructure

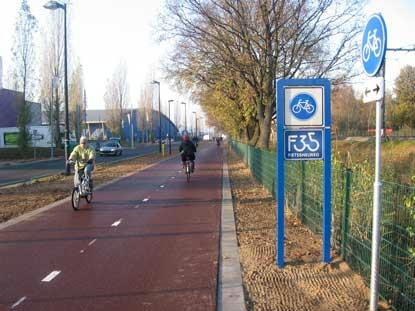
The bicycle highway F35 in Enschede, Netherlands.

A bicycle highway, also known as a fast cycle route or bike freeway, is an informal name for a bicycle path that is meant for long-distance traffic. There is no official definition of a bicycle highway. The characteristics of a cycling highway mentioned by authorities and traffic experts include an absence of single-level intersections with motorized traffic, a better road surface (preferably asphalt or concrete) and the absence of traffic lights. Bicycle highways are mentioned in connection with traffic jam. Owing to higher average speeds than normal cycling infrastructure, they provide an alternative to the car in commuter traffic. Often a cycling highway follows the route of a railway or other linear infrastructure.

== Definition ==
Traffic sign for „Radschnellweg“ in Germany since 2020

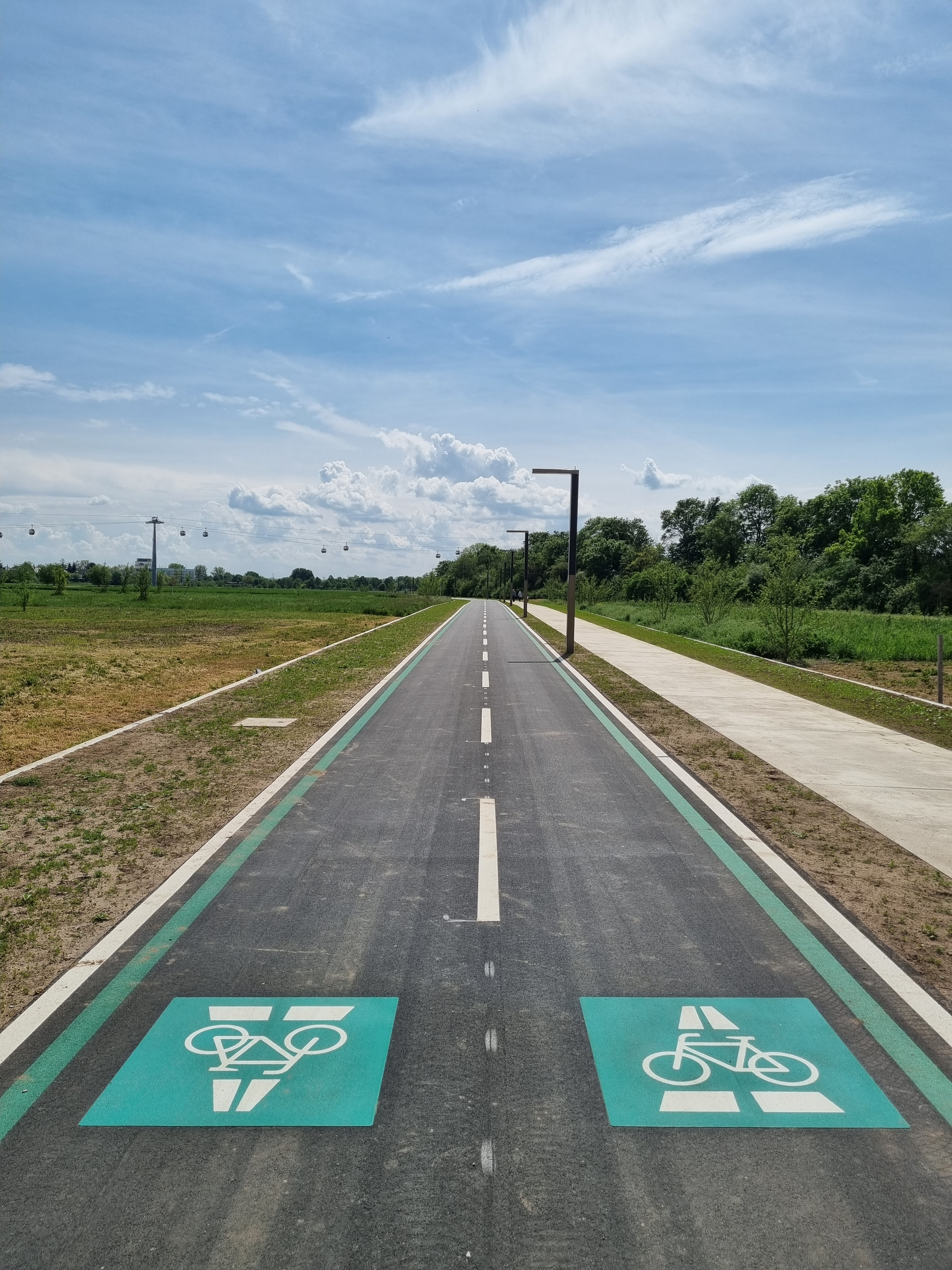
Radschnellweg RS 15 in Mannheim, Germany. The open landscape makes it vulnerable to crosswinds, which can be uncomfortable for cyclists.

=== Netherlands ===
In the Netherlands the bicycle highway is not defined in the RVV (Dutch: Reglement verkeersregels en verkeerstekens). However, there is a guideline for developing bicycle highways. The Dutch Ministry of Transport, Public Works and Water Management describes the bicycle highway as a long cycle path without crossings, on which cyclists can travel long distances. By building bicycle highways, the government hopes, among other things, to promote the use of bicycles for commuter traffic and thus prevent traffic jams.

In the Netherlands, the following people can use a bike freeway:

- Cyclists: 'ordinary' cyclists, recumbents, cargo bikes, velomobiles, pedelecs.
- Riders of a motorized bicycle with a maximum speed of 25 km/h (16 mph).
- Depending on the location also mopeds, with a maximum speed of 40 km/h (25 mph).
- Pedestrians if pavement and footpath are missing.
- Riders of a segway.
- Drivers of a disabled vehicle, with a maximum speed of 30 km/h (19 mph).

=== Belgium ===
In Belgium this type of cycle path is not mentioned in the Road Code. In Flanders, the provincial governments and the Flemish Region take the initiative for the construction of bicycle highways. At the Flemish regional level there are no guidelines on the design of cycle highways, only on 'normal' cycle paths. In practice, there are differences between the provinces. This is because the authorized Flemish departments (MOW, Department of Policy) and agencies (AWV) are organized per province, which results in different emphasis per region, and are under the jurisdiction of the provincial governments. They are called a bicycle highway because of the route signaling. The Flemish and Brussels bicycle highways are numbered and indicated as such.

There is no maximum speed (for cyclists), unless indicated otherwise.

== Features ==
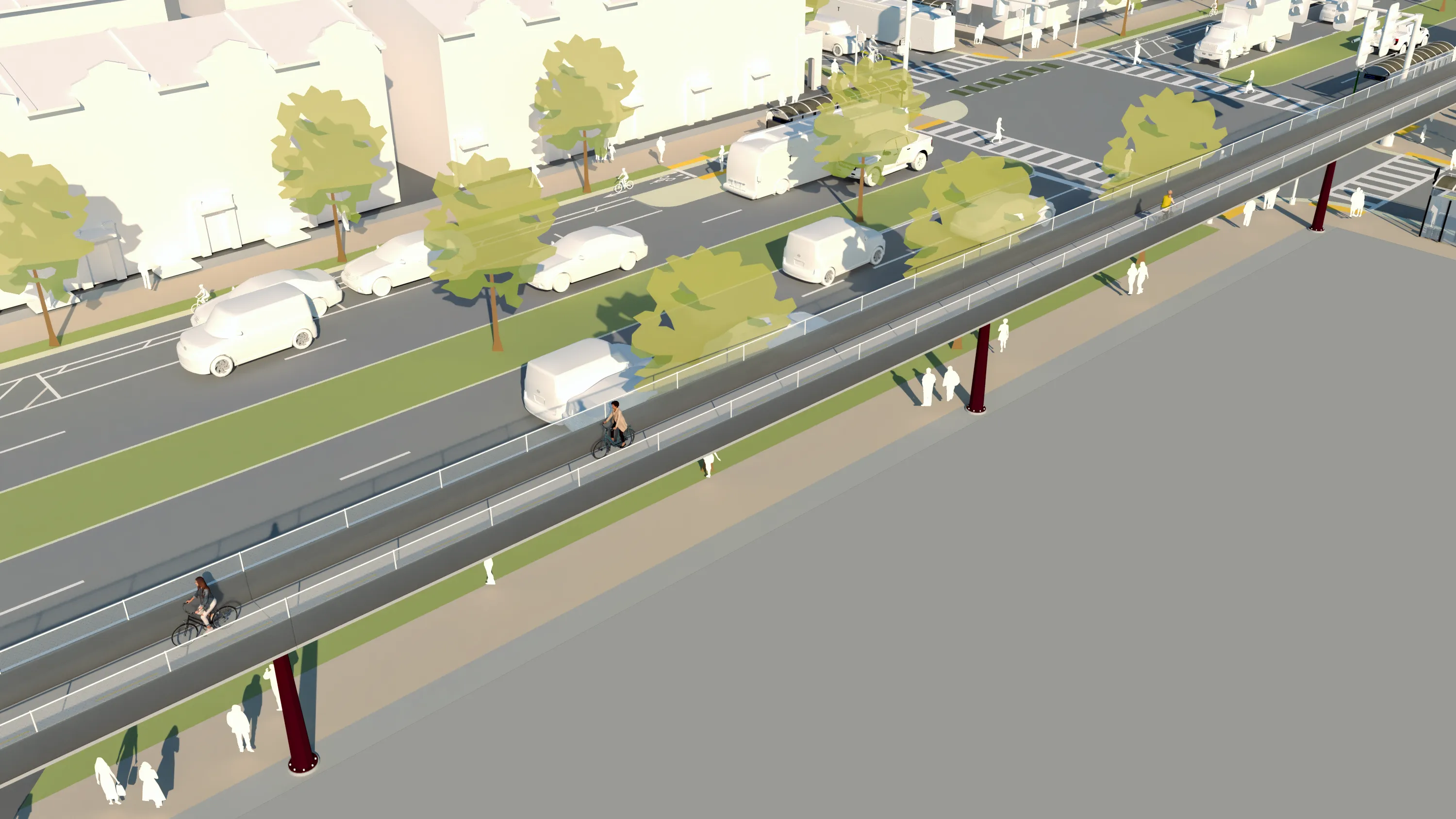
Elevated bikeway 3D sketch

=== Cost of construction ===
The cost of building a bicycle super highway depends on many things, but is usually between €300,000/km (for a wide dedicated cycle track) and €800,000/km (when complex civil engineering structures are needed).

=== Technical parameters ===
In the Netherlands, the minimum desired width of the bicycle lane is 2 metres (6 ft 7 in) on the bicycle highway. The absolute minimum width of the bicycle lane is 1.5 metres (4 ft 11 in).

In Flanders region of Belgium, the minimum width of new bicycle highways is 4 metres (13 ft), allowing for bidirectional traffic with up to 4 cyclists side by side. This is one metre wider than the minimum width of new ordinary bidirectional cycleways.

In Poland, the Ministry of Infrastructure recommends that bicycle highways should be at least 4 metres (13 ft) wide (3 m or 9.8 ft for one-way highways), while lane width should be at least 1.75 metres (5 ft 9 in). The typical distance between the bicycle highway and footway clearances should be 3 metres (9.8 ft). The recommended design speed is 40 km/h (25 mph).

== Bike freeways by country ==
=== Belgium ===
The bicycle highway network of the Flemish and Brussels regions are managed by a consortium made up of the five Flemish Provinces and the Brussels-Capital Region. In Flanders, all routes are indicated with a number starting with an F, going from F1 to F791. The 'F' refers to Dutch: Fietssnelweg, lit. 'Bicycle highway'. In the Brussels-Capital Region, the 'F' is replaced by a 'C', with the route's numbering staying identical. Both regions use the same signage and signposts made up of a stylised light blue triangle; only the 'F' letter becoming a 'C' in Brussels territory.

==== Brussels-Capital Region ====
The bike freeways within Brussels are connected to the Flemish network and are identified through a number starting with C (for cyclostrade, a neologism compatible with both Dutch and French), going from C1 to C223, the numbers being identical to the Flemish pathways starting with F.

Furthermore, in and around the Brussels Region, four circular bike freeways: CR0, CR1, CR2 and CR20 loop around the city. The CR0 and CR20 numbering is related to the ring way next to which they were built: R0 for the Brussels Ring, R20 for the Small Ring.

==== Flemish Region ====
Map of Flemish cycle highways, some protruding to Brussels and Wallonia.

Within Flanders, a network of bike freeways, consisting of around 120 routes, is being rolled out, connecting all Flemish cities. All routes are indicated with a number starting with an F, going from F1 to F791.

The whole network will consist of 2,700 km (1,700 mi) of bike freeways, connecting all Flemish cities. As of 2018, around 1,500 km (930 mi) was completed. Most Flemish cities are therefore already connected by bike freeways or a temporary alternative. It's therefore possible to travel around the whole Flemish region by bike from city to city with a nearly absence (or at least minimum) of single-level intersections with motorized traffic ("without a single stop"). Ghent is for example connected by bike freeways to almost all neighbouring Flemish cities (Bruges, Deinze, Kortrijk, Roeselare, Oudenaarde, Antwerp,...).

As of 2022, 38 projects for constructions of parts of these cycle highways were under construction. 50 projects were in preparation. 8000 cyclists per hour were counted at some places.

Many bike freeways are purpose-built, with dedicated bicycle bridges and intersections or at least (two-way) bicycle paths. Many purpose-built bike freeways follow the route of the railway system. However, many existing towpaths along rivers and canals have also been integrated within this network of bike freeways as they often responded to the minimum requirements with only minor adaptations.

==== Wallonia ====
Since the end of the 1980s, Wallonia has been developing an extended network of over 1,440 km (890 mi) of separated and long-distance pathways connecting all major cities and secondary municipalities through its RAVeL network. Therefore, the region is not implementing additional bike freeways, even though the RAVeL network is generally also open to pedestrians and sometimes horse riders, and the speed is limited to 30 km/h (19 mph).

=== Netherlands ===
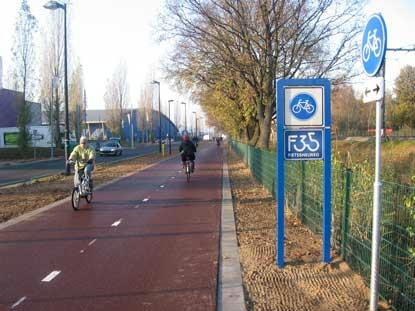
A bicycle highway in the Netherlands. Cyclists on the F35 doorfietsroute in Enschede.

The first Dutch route opened in 2004 between Breda and Etten-Leur, with many others having been added since then. In 2017, several doorfietsroutes (the official Dutch term for their bicycle highways, literally translating to "continuous cycle route") were opened in Arnhem–Nijmegen, notably the RijnWaalpad.

=== Denmark ===
In Denmark there exists a network of long-distance and high-speed cycle paths connecting the suburban areas of Copenhagen with the city core. There are eight routes in operation in September 2018. There are plans of building 45 routes with a total length of 476 km (296 mi) by 2021 in the cities and municipalities of the Capitol Region of Denmark.

The first Danish route, C99, opened in 2012 between Vesterport railway station in Vesterbro, Copenhagen and Albertslund, a western suburb. The route cost DKK 13.4 million (approx. EUR 1.8 million) and is 17.5 km (10.9 mi) long, built with few stops and new paths away from traffic. “Service stations” with air pumps are located at regular intervals, and where the route must cross streets, handholds and running boards are provided so cyclists can wait without having to put their feet on the ground. Similar projects have since been built in Germany among other countries.

=== Germany ===
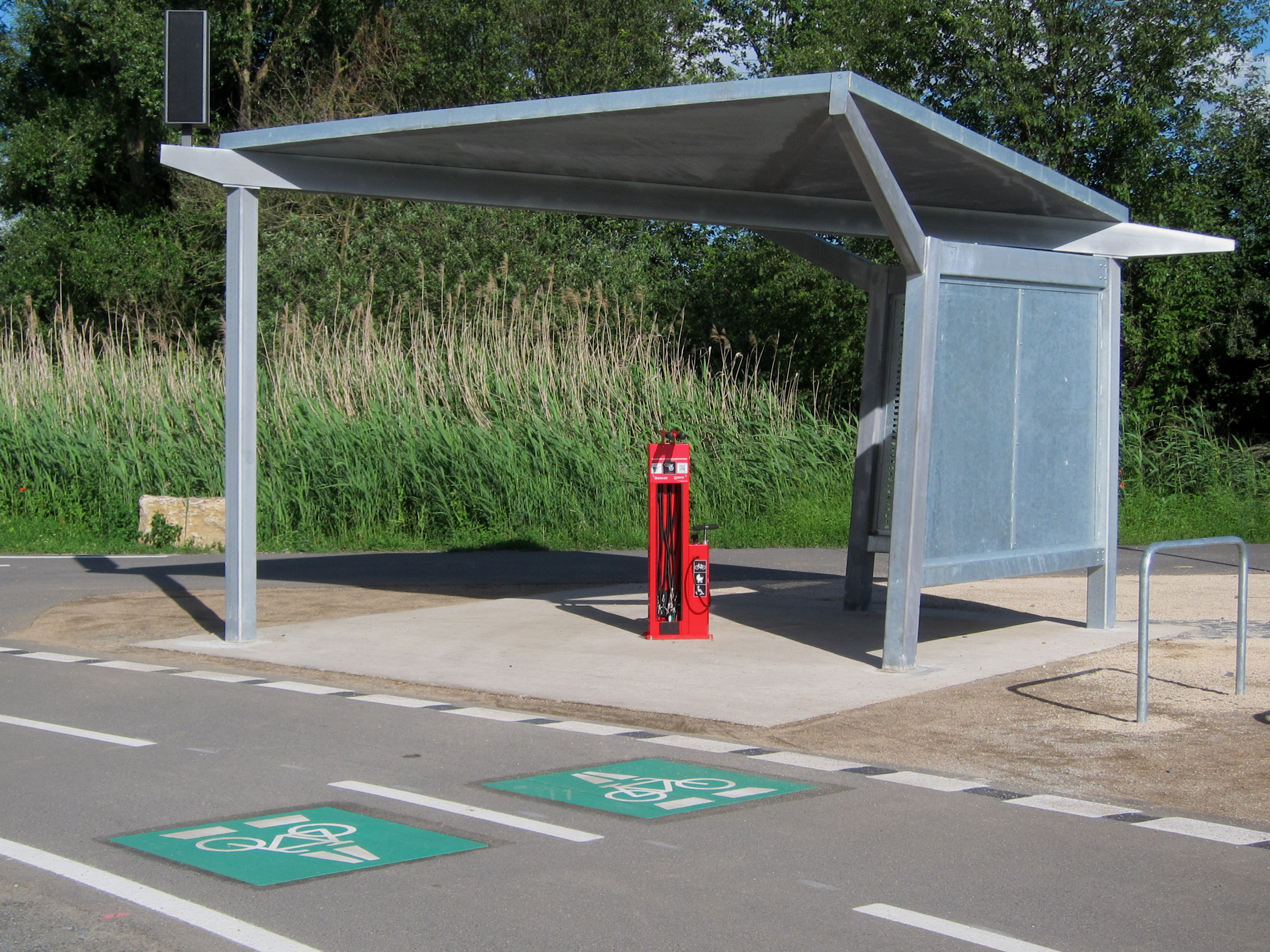
A repair station at a bicycle highway in Germany

There are also bicycle highways and new plans in Germany to build bicycle highways, called Radschnellweg in German.

A 100 km-long (62 mi) fast cycle route (Ruhr cycle expressway) has been planned between the cities of Duisburg and Hamm, the first parts of which were completed in 2015, this includes a disused railway line.

In addition, there is a plan to connect Aachen via a 30 km-long (19 mi) cycle route with the Dutch town of Heerlen. This route is known as the Radschnellweg StädteRegion Aachen.

=== Poland ===
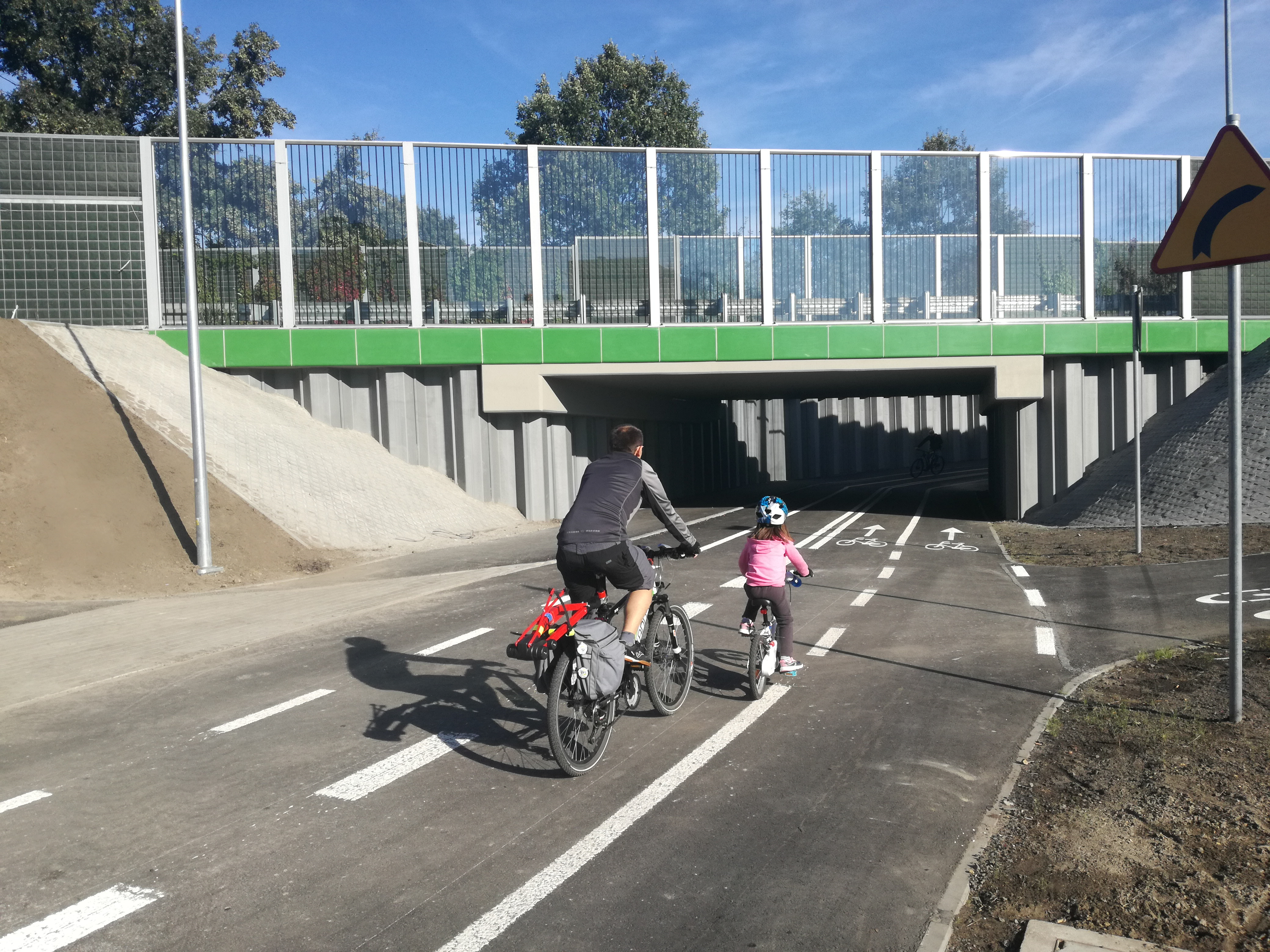
A bicycle highway in Jaworzno.

The first bicycle highway in Poland (Jaworzno bicycle highway) was opened in 2018 in the city of Jaworzno, in Katowice urban area, with a length of over 10 km (6.2 mi).

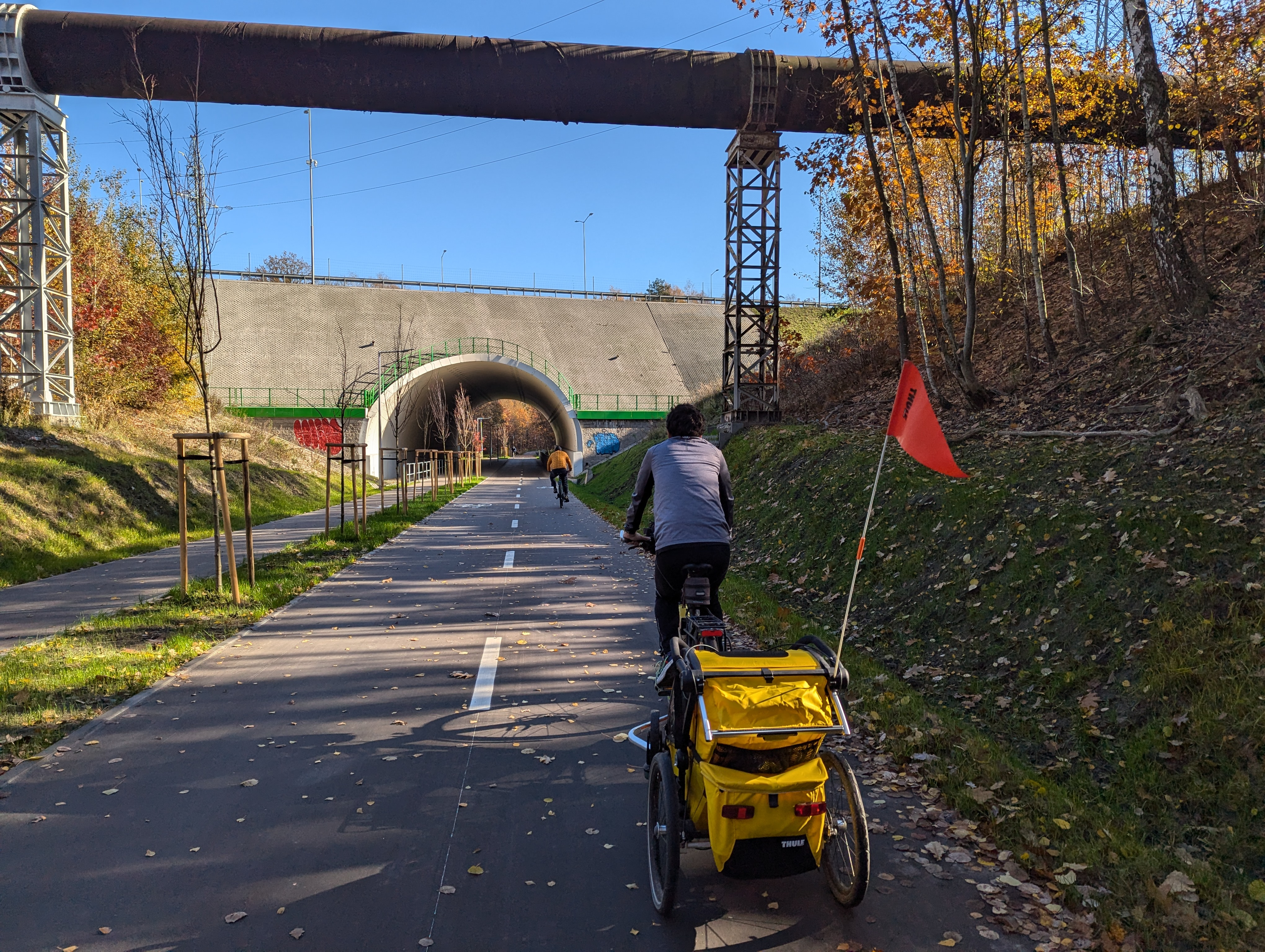
Metropolitan bicycle highway 6 in Katowice.

Furthermore, Metropolis GZM is coordinating a project to construct a 120 km-long (75 mi) network of bicycle highways (Metropolis GZM bicycle highways) connecting other cities of the urban area. The construction of the network's first 4.4 km-long (2.7 mi) segment was carried out in 2024.

=== Sweden ===
Sweden's first bicycle highway was built in the municipality of Örebro in 2012. Bicycle highways were also built in 2018 in Umeå Municipality.

=== United Kingdom ===
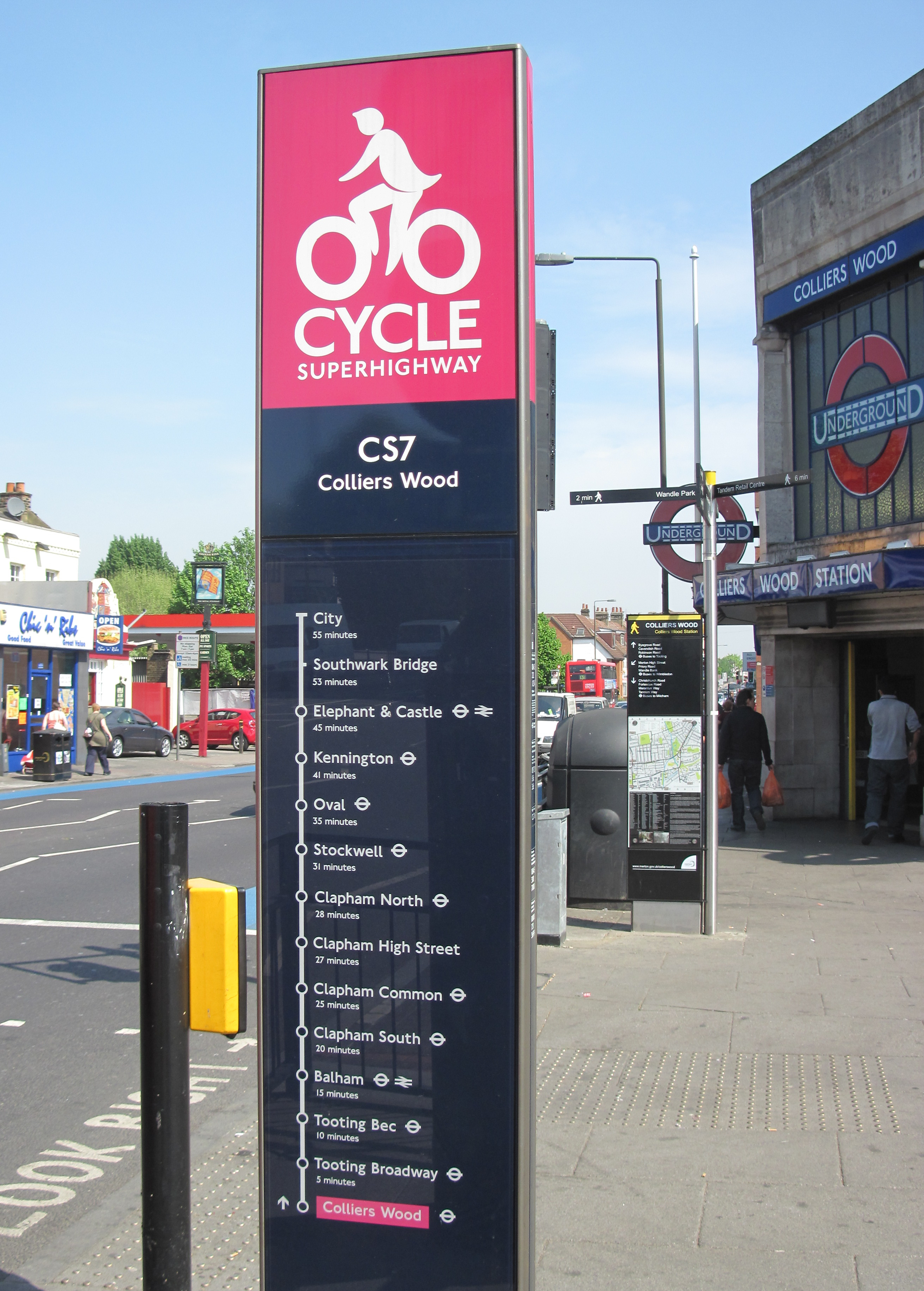
Cycle Superhighway CS7 start point at Colliers Wood Underground Station

In London, twelve new bicycle routes, dubbed Cycleways (originally called Cycle Superhighways), were announced in 2008 by Mayor Ken Livingstone, with the aim of creating continuous cycle routes from outer London into and across central London by the end of 2012.

As of May 2016, only seven cycle superhighways were operational: CS1—CS3 and CS5—CS8.

=== United States ===
The United States Bicycle Route System (USBRS) is numbering bicycle routes including state bikeways.

One of the United States' first bicycle freeways is a portion of the Midtown Greenway in Minneapolis, Minnesota, completed between 2000 and 2004. For 3 miles, this section travels along a below-grade railroad corridor underneath 35 street bridges in addition to I-35W bridges, a pedestrian bridge, and a skyway. There is one intersection at 5th Ave, but the cross-traffic is required to stop for the bicycle freeway traffic. There's also a traffic signal dedicated to bicyclists and pedestrians on the north side of the one-way Park Avenue bridge so that bicycle traffic can cross between the bike lane on the east side of Park Avenue and the ramp for the bike freeway on the west side of Park Avenue. This bicycle freeway cost over $36 million to complete all sections in 2007. Minneapolis also has other bicycle freeways that extend to neighboring suburbs from the Grand Rounds Scenic Byway.

Some bike paths are built alongside a freeway made for automobiles, a notable example being the I-275 Metro Trail, a bike path along Interstate 275 in Monroe, Wayne and Oakland counties in Michigan.

=== United Arab Emirates ===
In 2023, plans were unveiled for a 93 km (58 mi) cycling highway, a climate-controlled year-round structure designed to promote cycling and walking as a primary mode of transport for people in Dubai. The project called The Loop, will connect 3 million residents to key services and locations within minutes by walking and cycling.
