= RijnWaalpad =

Bicycle highway in Gelderland, Netherlands

The RijnWaalpad (Dutch for "Rhine-Waal path") is a bicycle highway (Dutch: doorfietsroute) in the province of Gelderland in the Netherlands. The 15.8 km (9.8 mi) long cycle path connects the city of Arnhem on the River Rhine (Dutch: Rijn) and the city of Nijmegen on the River Waal. Costing €17 million, it was opened on July 3, 2015, making it the first of its kind in the region.

The RijnWaalpad is a dedicated bicycle highway that is separated from motor traffic as much as possible. It is designed to minimise interruptions: cyclists cross major roads mostly by bridges or tunnels so they rarely have to stop at traffic lights, while at smaller crossings, cyclists generally have priority. Infrastructure that has been expressly built for the RijnWaalpad include a bicycle tunnel under the A15 motorway, a bicycle bridge at Lent and another tunnel at Bemmel.

== See also ==
- Cycling in the Netherlands#Doorfietsroutes (continuous cycle routes)
- Bicycle highway
