= RAVeL network =

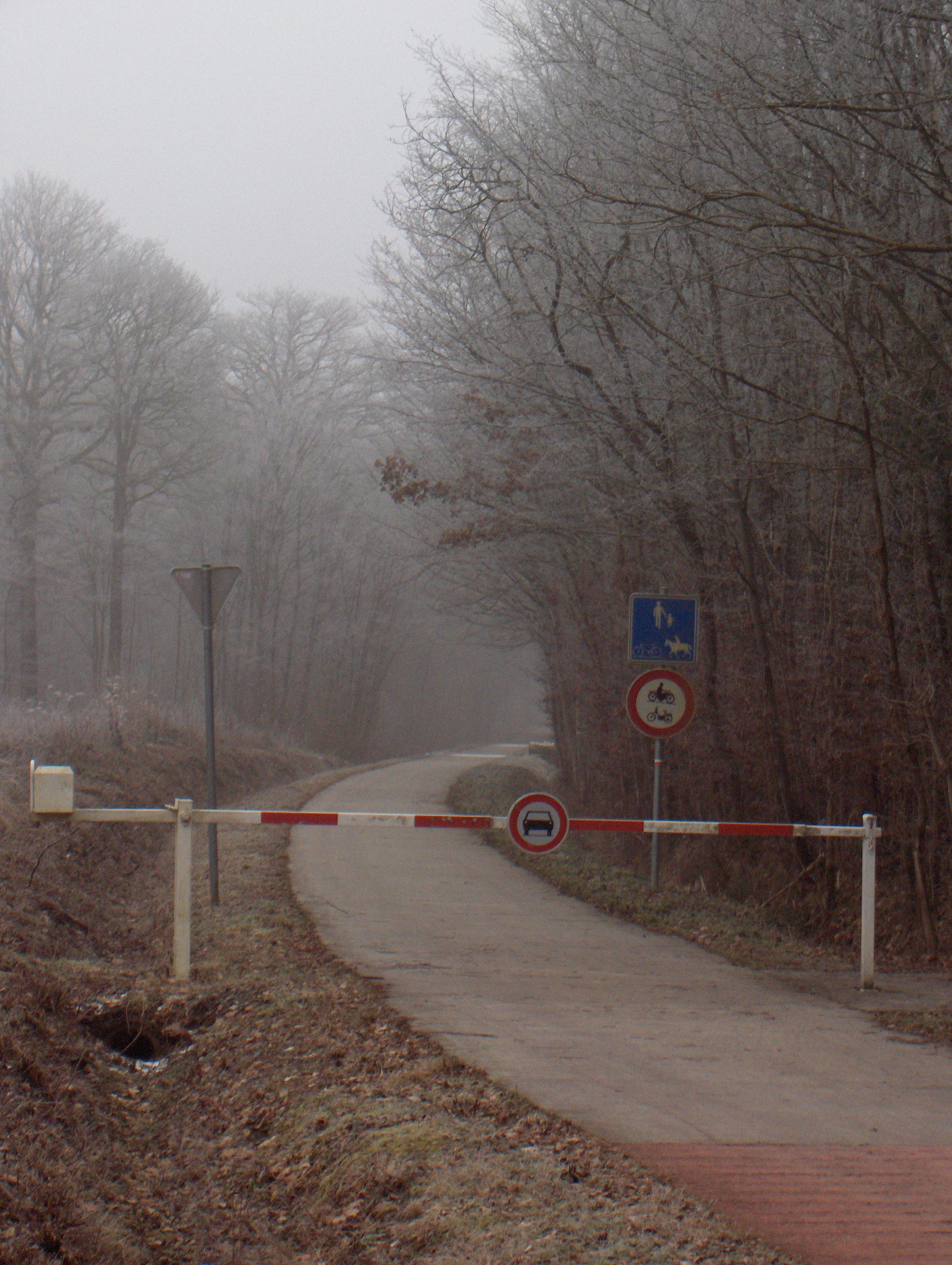
A RAVeL path, between Chimay and Froidchapelle.

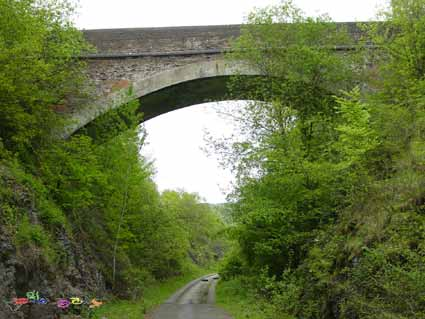
RAVeL Rochefort-Houyet

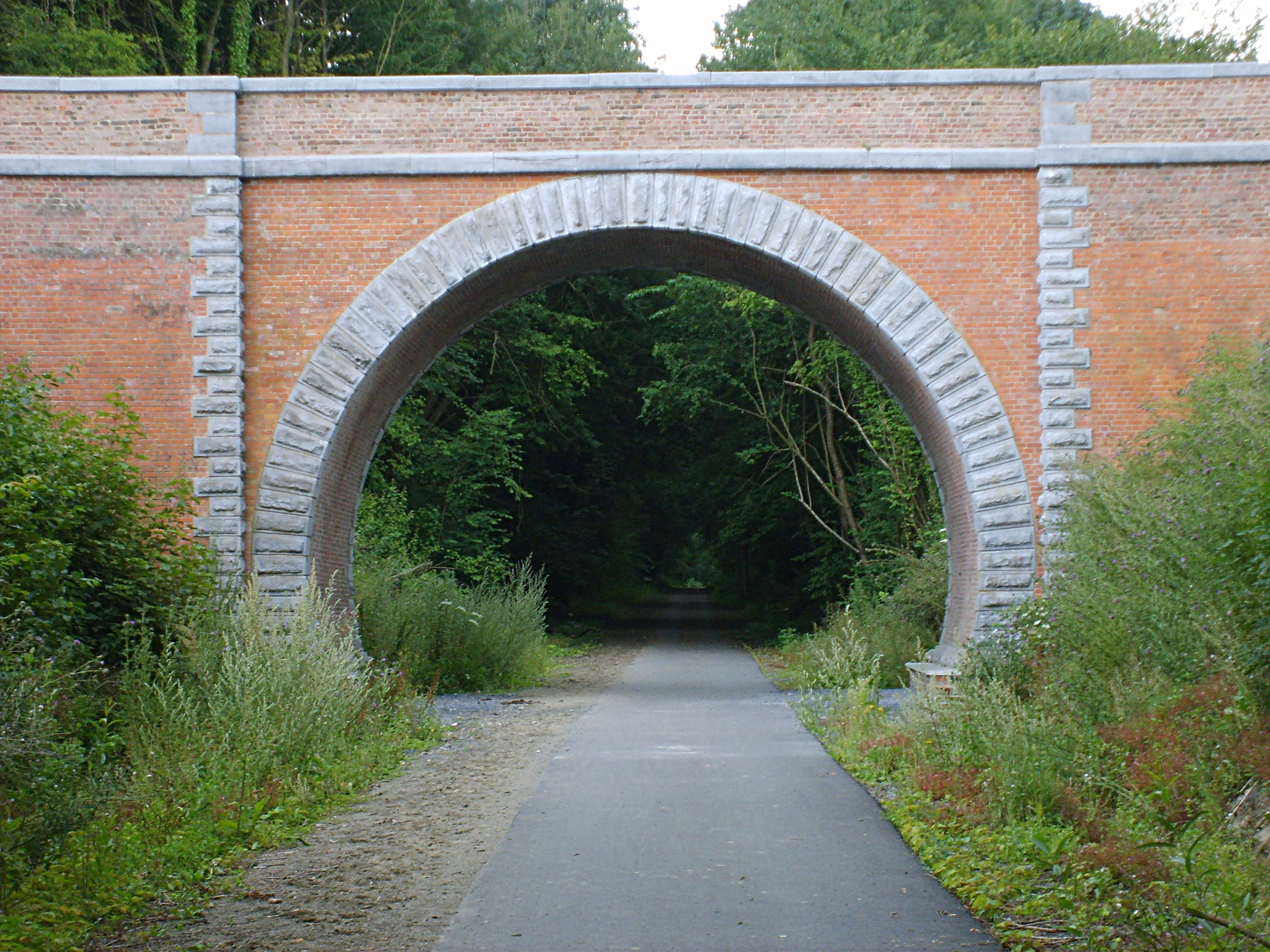
RAVeL Binche-Erquelinnes

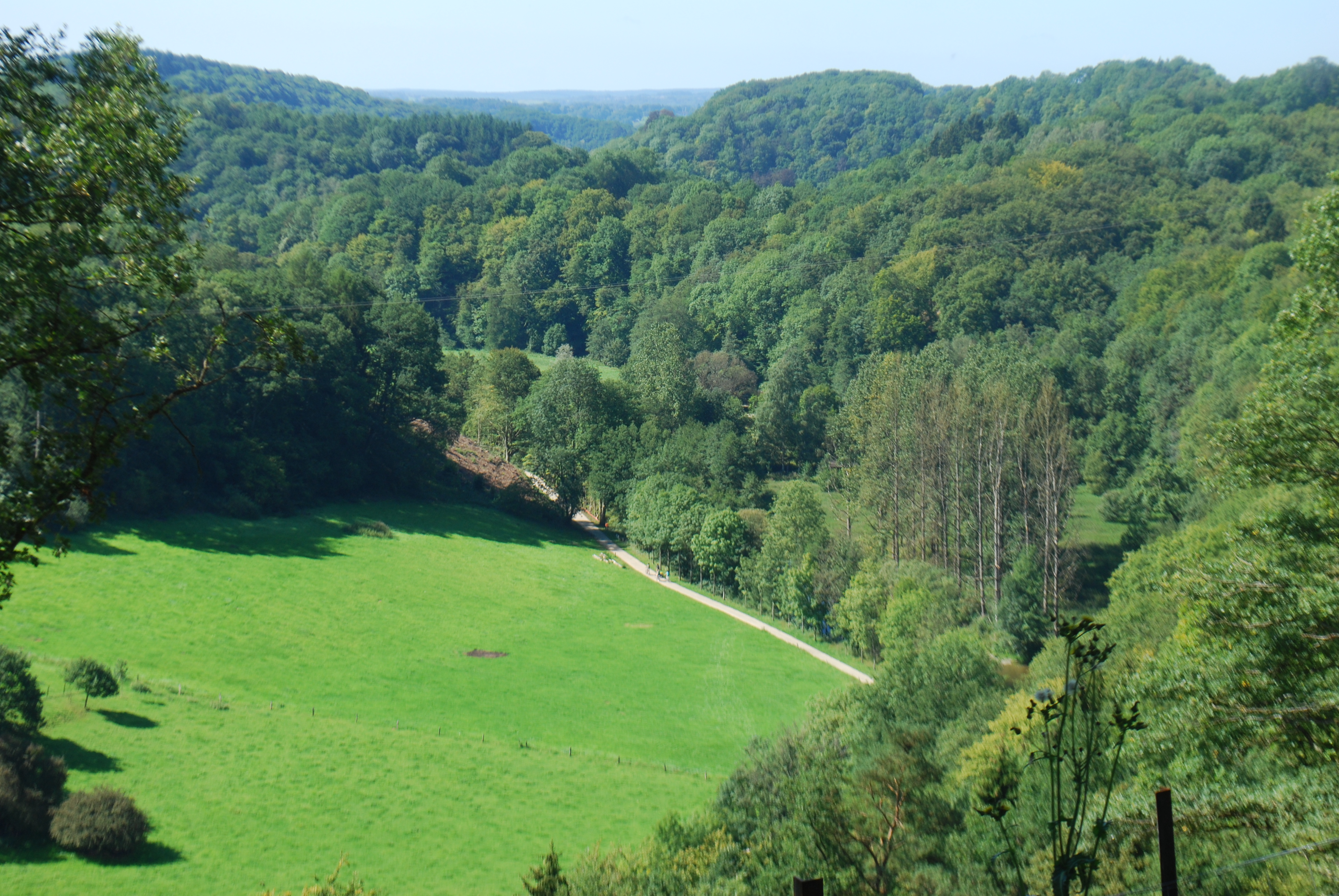
RAVeL Bomal-Durbuy

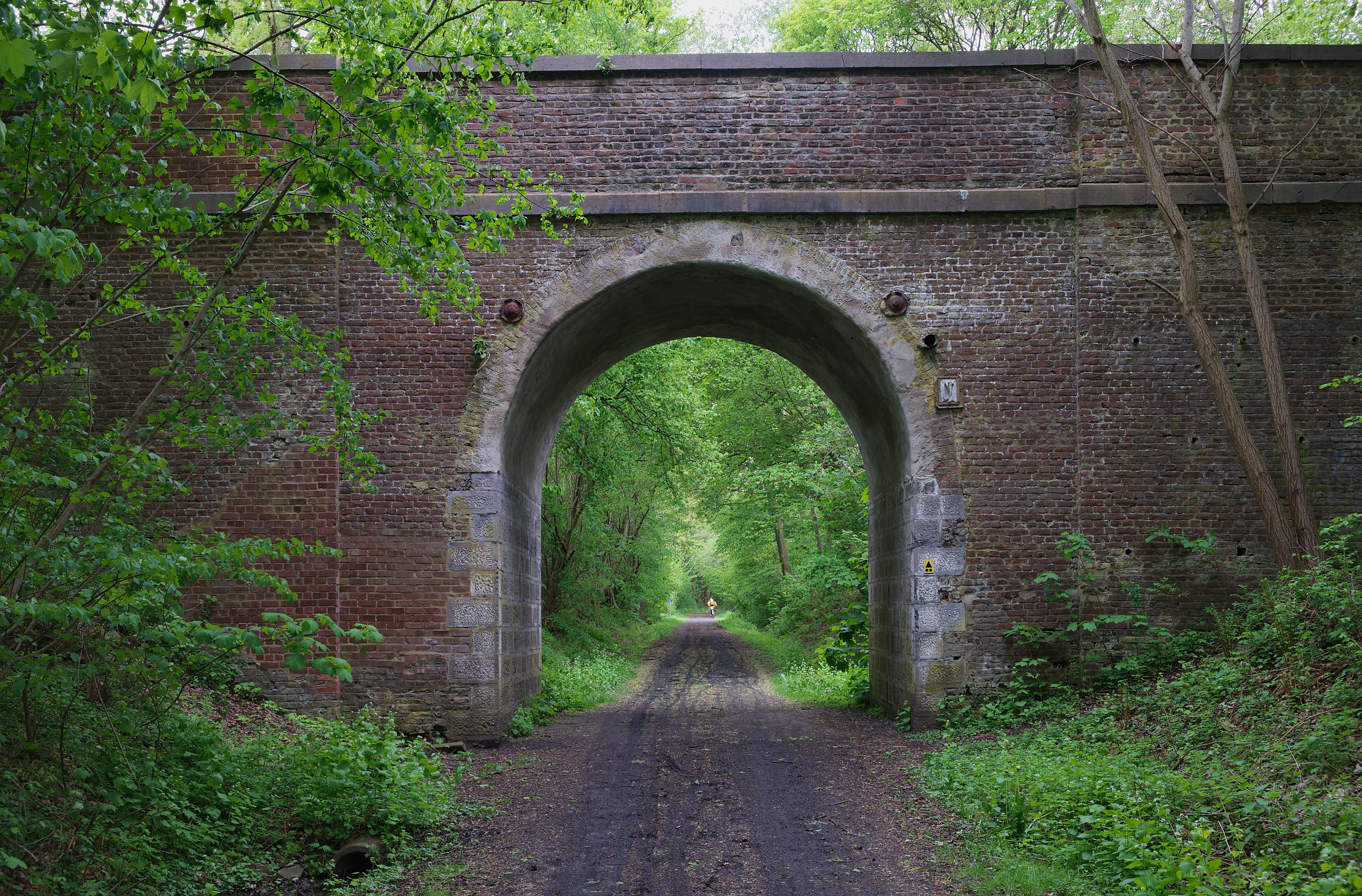
RAVeL 38

RAVeL or in French: Réseau autonome des voies lentes (in autonomous network of slow ways) is a Walloon initiative aimed at creating a network of itineraries reserved for pedestrians, cyclists, horse riders and people with reduced mobility, initiated at the end of the 1980s and connecting major cities and secondary municipalities of Wallonia through over 1,440 km (890 mi) of pathways.

The network makes use of towpaths on river banks and disused railway or vicinal tramway lines. Old railway lines have been leased by the Government of Wallonia to the project under agreement to provide preventative maintenance when required. Where necessary, new paths are created to link independent parts of the network together.

== History ==
Before World War II, Belgium had the world's densest railway network, with around 10,000 kilometres (6,200 mi) of railway and vicinal tramway tracks. Large parts of this network were disused after the war, with the development of road infrastructure and the preference for private cars. Concurrently, towing paths along rivers were made obsolete by new, motorized boats.

In 1977, the Belgian Ministry of Public Works bought a large section of former SNCB line 142 between Hoegaarden and Eghezée, and converted a first section (in Jodoigne) into a pedestrian/cyclist path in 1985.

During the same period, other similar conversions of old railway lines are carried out in various parts of Belgium. The RAVeL project was initiated in 1995 and the first section opened in 1996, between Rochefort and Villers-sur-Lesse. The project has the benefit of coordinating the various conversions to form a coherent, Wallonia wide network.

A 4 December 1997 ministerial order, aimed at classifying Walloon public roads into functional categories, provides an official status to the RAVeL network. At the end of 2004, the network spans on 885-kilometre (550 mi) of paths, and more than 1,000-kilometre (620 mi) at the end of 2008. By 2022 there were over 45 marked local routes extending to more than 1,440 km (890 mi).

== Characteristics ==
- Asphalt or concrete paths wherever possible
- Renovation of bridges, tunnels and other infrastructure along the paths
- Creation of access points such as stairs and ramps
- Creation of rest areas along the paths
- Secure road crossings
- Specific signage

== Network structure ==
The RAVeL network is divided into:

- A backbone of five long distance itineraries (French: itinéraires), numbered from 1 to 5.
- A set of local, shorter sections (French: sections), generally named after the number of the former railway line they follow.

Additionally, sections earmarked for RAVeL conversion, with basic equipment but not yet to RAVeL standard, are labelled Pré-RAVeL.

The RAVeL is connected to similar networks in adjacent regions (Flanders and Brussels) and countries (France, Luxembourg, Germany and Netherlands).

RAVeL itineraries as of 2009
#	Itinerary	Length	Remarks
1	Comines-Warneton – Tournai – Mons – Charleroi – Namur – Liège – Maastricht	289.4-kilometre (179.8 mi)	Divided into 3 parts : RAVeL 1 Ouest : Comines-Warneton – Mons; RAVeL 1 Centre : Mons – Namur; RAVeL 1 Est : Namur Maastricht
2	Mariembourg – Dinant – Namur – Jodoigne – Hoegaarden	116.4-kilometre (72.3 mi)	
3	Erquelinnes – Charleroi – Tubize	91.4-kilometre (56.8 mi)	
4	Saint-Aybert – Ath – Lessines – Geraardsbergen (Overboelare)	52.9-kilometre (32.9 mi)	
5	Durbuy – Liège – Plombières	90.7-kilometre (56.4 mi)	

== Related articles ==
- Voie verte
